= Albanian paganism =

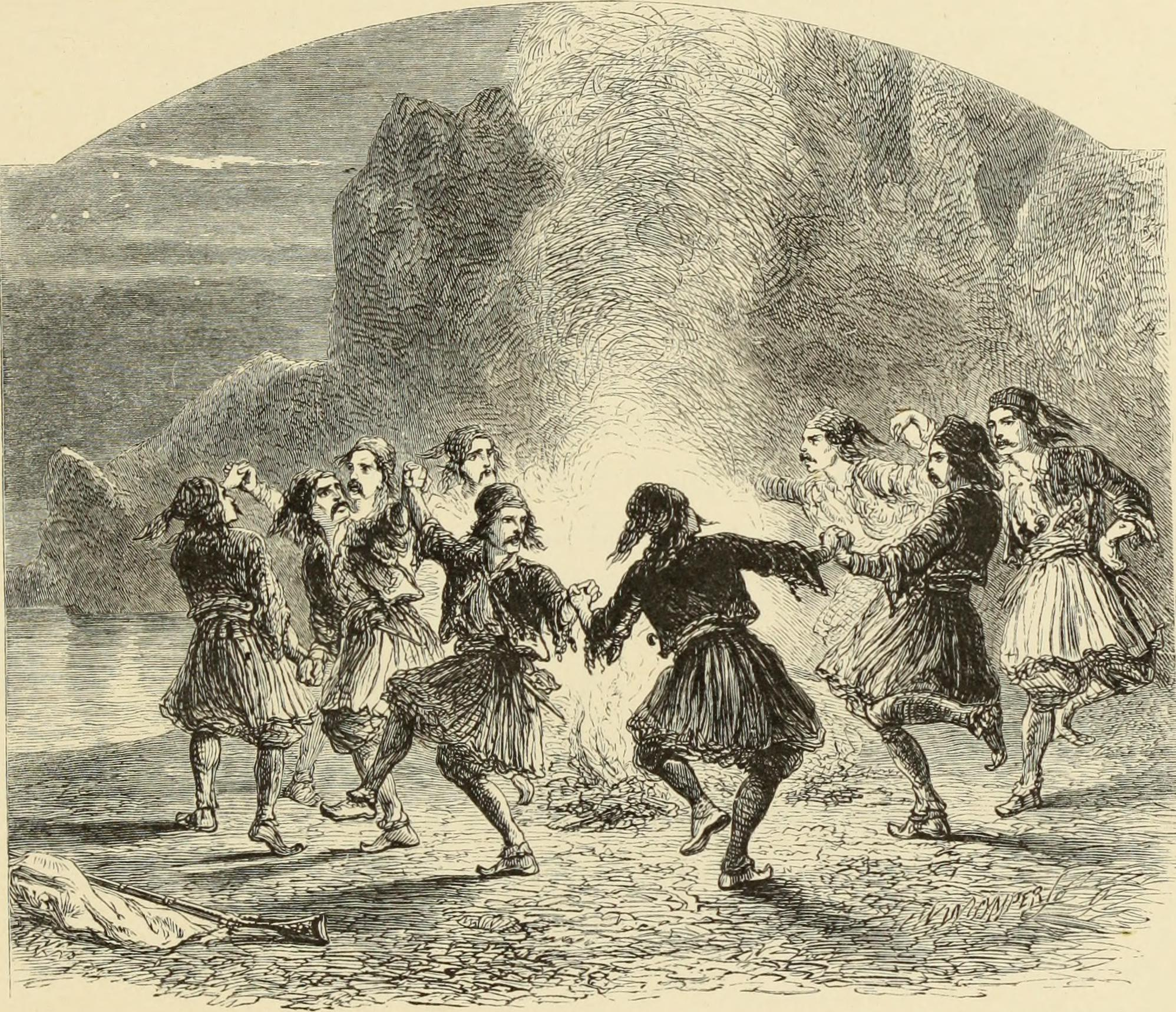
Albanian warrior dance in circle around fire (zjarri), drawing from the book Childe Harold's Pilgrimage written by Lord Byron in the early 19th century. Practiced for several hours with very short intervals, the dance gets new vigour from the words of the accompanying song that starts with a battle cry invoking war drums, and which is of a piece with the movement and usually changed only once or twice during the whole performance. The ritual purifying fire is traditionally used by Albanians, in particular singing and dancing around it, to gain protection and energizing from its supernatural power.

Albanian paganism comprises the pre-Christian customs, beliefs, rituals, myths and legends of the Albanian people. The oldest stratum of Albanian mythology is of ancient Paleo-Balkanic origin. Ancient paganism persisted among Albanians, and especially within the inaccessible and deep interior – where Albanian folklore evolved over the centuries in a relatively isolated tribal culture and society – it has continued to persist, or at most it was partially transformed by the Christian, Muslim and Marxist beliefs that were either to be introduced by choice or imposed by force. The Albanian traditional customary law (Kanun) has held a sacred – although secular – longstanding, unwavering and unchallenged authority with a cross-religious effectiveness over the Albanians, which is attributed to an earlier pagan code common to all the Albanian tribes. Indeed, the Kanun contains several customary concepts that clearly have their origins in pagan beliefs, including in particular the ancestor worship, animism and totemism, which have been preserved since pre-Christian times. Albanian traditions have been orally transmitted – through memory systems that have survived intact into modern times – down the generations. They are still very much alive in the mountainous regions of Albania, Kosovo, Montenegro and western North Macedonia, as well as among the Arbëreshë in Italy, the Arvanites in Greece and the Arbanasi in Croatia.

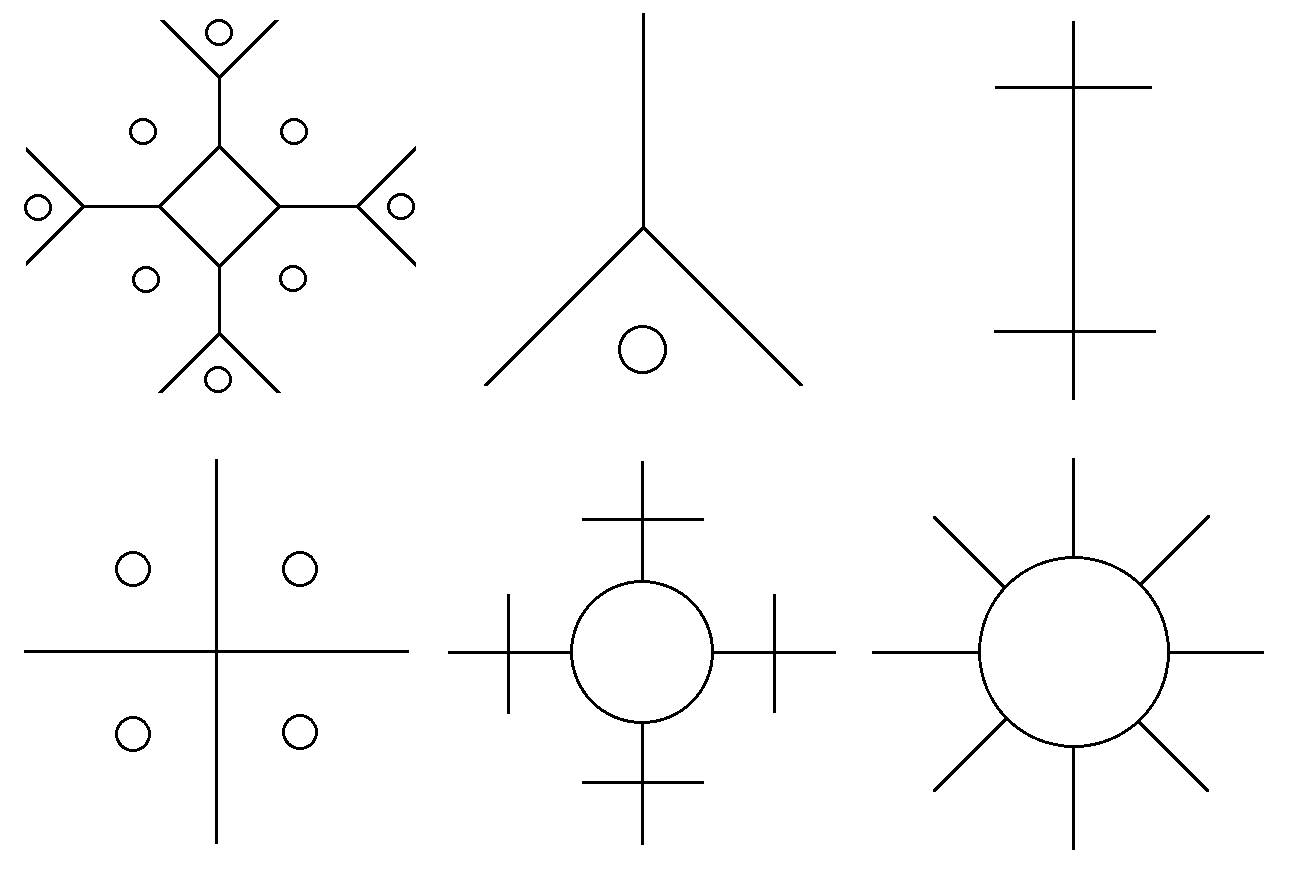
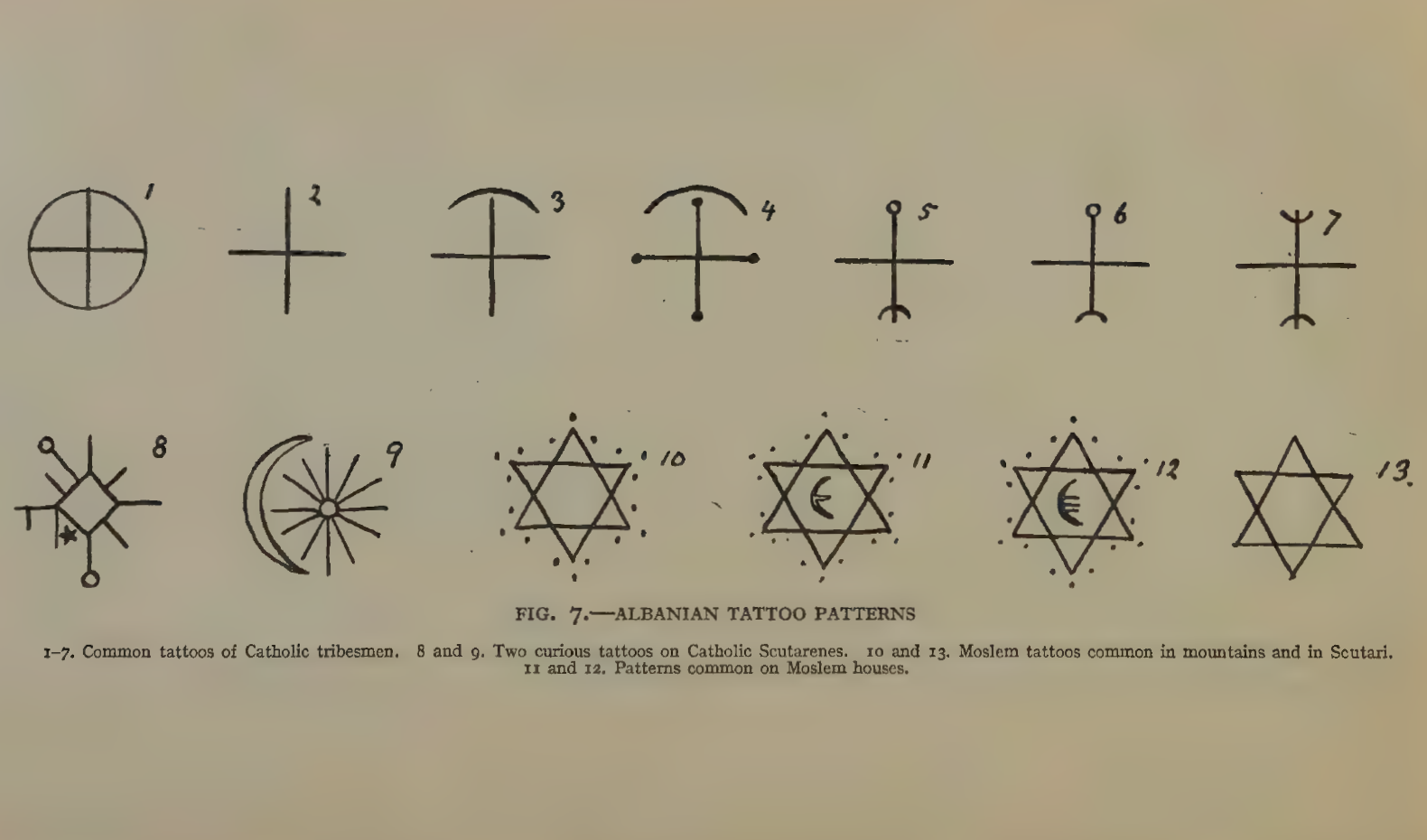
Albanian traditional tattoo patterns: 19th century (top), early 20th century (bottom). They are symbols of the Sun (Dielli) and the Moon (Hëna); the cross (also swastika in some tattoos) is the Albanian traditional way to represent the deified Fire – Zjarri, evidently also called with the theonym Enji. Also appearing in other expressions of Albanian traditional art (graves, jewellery, embroidery, and house carvings), they represent celestial, light, fire and hearth worship, expressing the favor of the light within the dualistic struggle between light and darkness. The Fire rituals and the Sun and Moon worship are the earliest attested cults of the Albanians.

The old beliefs in sun and moon, light and darkness, sky and earth, fire and hearth, water and springs, death and rebirth, birds and serpents, mountains, stones and caves, sacrifice, and fate are some of the pagan beliefs among Albanians. The Fire (Zjarri) rituals and the Sun (Dielli) and Moon (Hëna) worship are the earliest attested cults of the Albanians. The Sun holds the primary role in Albanian pagan customs, beliefs, rituals, myths, and legends; Albanian major traditional festivities and calendar rites are based on the Sun, worshiped as the god of light, sky and weather, giver of life, health and energy, and all-seeing eye; the sunrise is honored as it is believed to give energy and health to the body. The Moon is worshiped as a goddess, with her cyclical phases regulating many aspects of Albanian life, defining agricultural and livestock activities, various crafts, and human body. The morning and evening star Venus is personified with Prende, associated with dawn, beauty, love, fertility, health, and the protection of women. The cult of the Earth (Dheu) and that of the Sky (Qielli) have a special place.

The Fire – Zjarri, evidently also called with the theonym Enji – is deified in Albanian tradition as releaser of light and heat with the power to ward off darkness and evil, affect cosmic phenomena and give strength to the Sun, and as sustainer of the continuity between life and afterlife and between the generations, ensuring the survival of the lineage (fis or farë). To spit into Fire is taboo. The divine power of Fire is used for the hearth and the rituals, including calendar fires, sacrificial offerings, divination, purification, and protection from big storms and other potentially harmful events. Fire worship and rituals are associated with the cult of the Sun, the cult of the hearth (vatër) and the ancestor, and the cult of fertility in agriculture and animal husbandry. Ritual calendar fires are associated with the cosmic cycle and the rhythms of agricultural and pastoral life.

Besa is a common practice in Albanian culture, consisting of an oath (be) solemnly taken by sun, by moon, by sky, by earth, by fire, by stone and thunderstone, by mountain, by water, and by snake, which are all considered sacred objects. Associated with human life, bees are highly revered by Albanians. The eagle is the animal totem of all Albanians, associated with the Sky, freedom and heroism. A widespread folk symbol is the serpent (Gjarpër, Vitore, etc.), a totem of the Albanians associated with earth, water, sun, hearth and ancestor cults, as well as destiny, good fortune and fertility. The sun, the moon, the star, the eagle (bird), the serpent, and the bee, often appear in Albanian legends and folk art.

In Albanian mythology, the physical phenomena, elements and objects are attributed to supernatural beings. The mythological and legendary figures are deities, demigods, humans, and monsters, as well as supernatural beings in the shapes of men, animals and plants. The deities are generally not persons, but animistic personifications of nature. Albanian beliefs, myths and legends are organized around the dualistic struggle between good and evil, light and darkness, the most famous representation of which is the constant battle between drangue and kulshedra, a conflict that symbolises the cyclic return in the watery and chthonian world of death, accomplishing the cosmic renewal of rebirth. The weavers of destiny, ora or fatí, control the order of the universe and enforce its laws. The zana are associated with wilderness and the vital energy of human beings. A very common motif in Albanian folk narrative is metamorphosis: men morph into deer, wolves, and owls, while women morph into stoats, cuckoos, and turtles. Resulted from the Albanian tribal culture and folklore and permeated by Albanian pagan beliefs and ancient mythology, the Kângë Kreshnikësh ("Songs of Heroes") constitute the most important legendary cycle of the Albanian epic poetry, based on the hero cult. Hero's bravery and self-sacrifice, as well as love of life and hope for a bright future play a central role in Albanian tales.

== Documentation ==
Albanian traditions have been handed down orally across generations. They have been preserved through traditional memory systems that have survived intact into modern times in Albania, a phenomenon that is explained by the lack of state formation among Albanians and their ancestors – the Illyrians, being able to preserve their "tribally" organized society. This distinguished them from civilizations such as Ancient Egypt, Minoans and Mycenaeans, who underwent state formation and disrupted their traditional memory practices.

Albanian traditional practices, beliefs, myths and legends have been sporadically described in written sources since the 15th century CE, but the systematic collection of Albanian customs and folklore material began only in the 19th century.

== Origin ==
The elements of Albanian mythology are of Paleo-Balkanic origin and almost all of them are pagan. Ancient Illyrian religion is considered to be one of the sources from which Albanian mythology and folklore evolved, reflecting a number of parallels with Ancient Greek and Roman mythologies. Albanian legend also shows similarities with neighbouring Indo-European traditions, such as the oral epics with the South Slavs and the folk tales of the Greeks.

Albanian mythology inherited the Indo-European narrative epic genre about past warriors (Kângë Kreshnikësh), a tradition shared with early Greece, classical India, early medieval England, medieval Germany and South Slavs. Albanian folk beliefs and mythology also retained the typical Indo-European tradition of the deities located on the highest and most inaccessible mountains (Mount Tomor). Albanian paganism retained the Indo-European sky, lightning and weather deities (Zojz, Shurdh, Verbt), Sun and Moon deities (Dielli and Hëna), the dawn goddess (Prende/Afërdita), fire rituals and deities and the hearth cult (Enji/Zjarri, Nëna e Vatrës, Vatër), the Fates and Destiny goddesses (Zana, Ora, Fatí, Mira), aspects of the earth worship (Dhé) and of the Divine twins (Muji and Halili), as well as the "serpent-slaying" and "fire in water" myths (Drangue and Kulshedra), the "Daughter of the Sun and Moon" legend (E Bija e Hënës dhe e Diellit), and the guard of the gates of the Underworld (the three-headed dog who never sleeps).

== History ==
The absence of any single and specific theonymic root for the "earth" in the various branches of the Indo-European language family, might be due to the predominance held by earth mother goddess cults already extant and profoundly rooted among Pre-Indo-European-speaking peoples encountered by incoming Indo-European-speaking peoples. The confrontation between the belief systems of Pre-Indo-European populations—who favored 'Mother Earth Cults' comprising earthly beliefs, female deities and priesthood—and of Indo-European populations who favored 'Father Heaven Cults' comprising celestial beliefs, male deities and priesthood, might be reflected in the dichotomy of matriarchy and patriarchy that emerges from the two types of female warriors/active characters in Albanian epic poetry, in particular in the Kângë Kreshnikësh. (Note: In Albanian epics there are on the one hand female characters who play an active role in the quest and the decisions that affect the whole tribe, on the other hand those who undergo a masculinization process as a condition to be able to participate actively in the fights according to the principles of the Kanun.) Nevertheless, the Albanian belief system has preserved also the importance of the cult of the earth, Dheu.

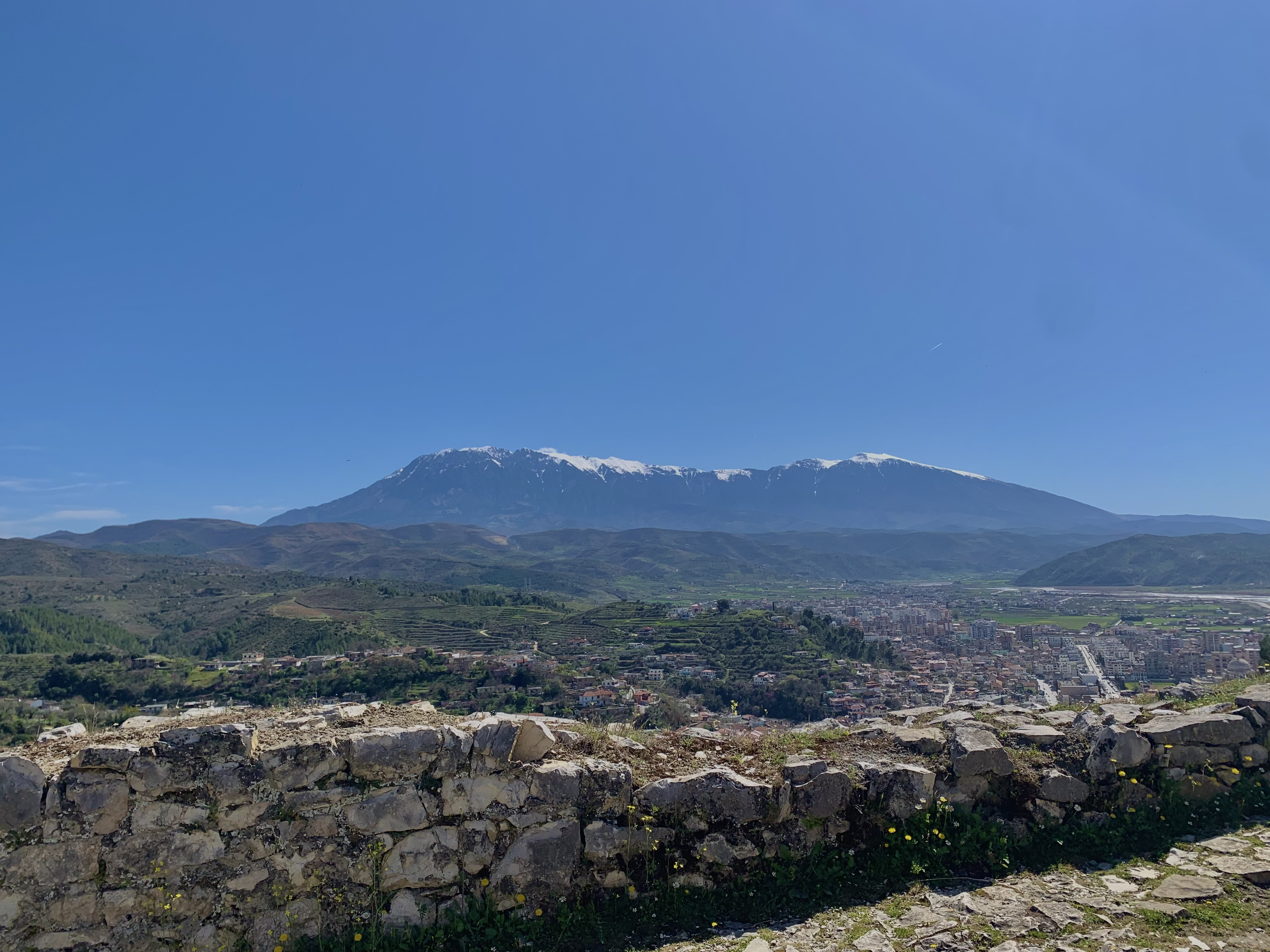
The cult practiced by the Albanians on Mount Tomorr in central Albania is considered as a continuation of the ancient sky-god worship.

The Albanian sky and lightning god, Zojz, is considered to have been worshiped by Illyrians in ancient times. Albanian Zojz is the clear equivalent and cognate of Messapic Zis and Ancient Greek Zeus, the continuations of the Proto-Indo-European *Di̯ḗu̯s 'sky god'. In the pre-Christian pagan period the term Zot from Proto-Albanian: *dźie̅u ̊ a(t)t- was presumably used in Albanian to refer to the sky father/god/lord, father-god, heavenly father (the Indo-European father daylight-sky-god). After the first access of the ancestors of the Albanians to the Christian religion in antiquity the term Zot has been used for God, the Father and the Son (Christ). The worship and practices associated to the Indo-European sky and lightning deity have been preserved by Albanians until the 20th century, and in some forms still continue today.

Early evidence of the celestial cult in Illyria is provided by 6th century BCE plaques from Lake Shkodra, which belonged to the Illyrian tribal area of what was referred in historical sources to as the Labeatae in later times. Each of those plaques portray simultaneously sacred representations of the sky and the sun, and symbolism of lightning and fire, as well as the tree of life and birds (eagles). In those plaques there is a mythological representation of the celestial deity: the Sun deity animated with a face and two wings, throwing lightning into a fire altar, which in some plaques is held by two men (sometimes on two boats). This mythological representation is identical to the Albanian folk belief and practice associated to the lightning deity: a traditional practice during thunderstorms was to bring outdoors a lit fireplace (vatër me zjarr), in order to gain the favor of the deity so the thunders would not be harmful to the human community. Albanian folk beliefs regard the lightning as Zjarri i Qiellit ("the Fire of the Sky") and consider it as the "weapon of the deity".

The earliest figurative representations that accurately mirror the Albanian lamentation of the dead—gjâmë—appear on Dardanian funerary stelae of classical antiquity. In the context of religious perceptions, historical sources confirm the relations between the Greco-Roman religious ethics and the Albanian customary laws. These relations can be seen during the rule of the Illyrian emperors, such as Aurelian who introduced the cult of the Sun; Diocletian who stabilized the empire and ensured its continuation through the institution of the Tetrarchy; Constantine the Great who issued the Edict of Toleration for the Christianized population and who summoned the First Council of Nicaea involving many clercs from Illyricum; Justinian who issued the Corpus Juris Civilis and sought to create an Illyrian Church, building Justiniana Prima and Justiniana Secunda, which was intended to become the centre of Byzantine administration.

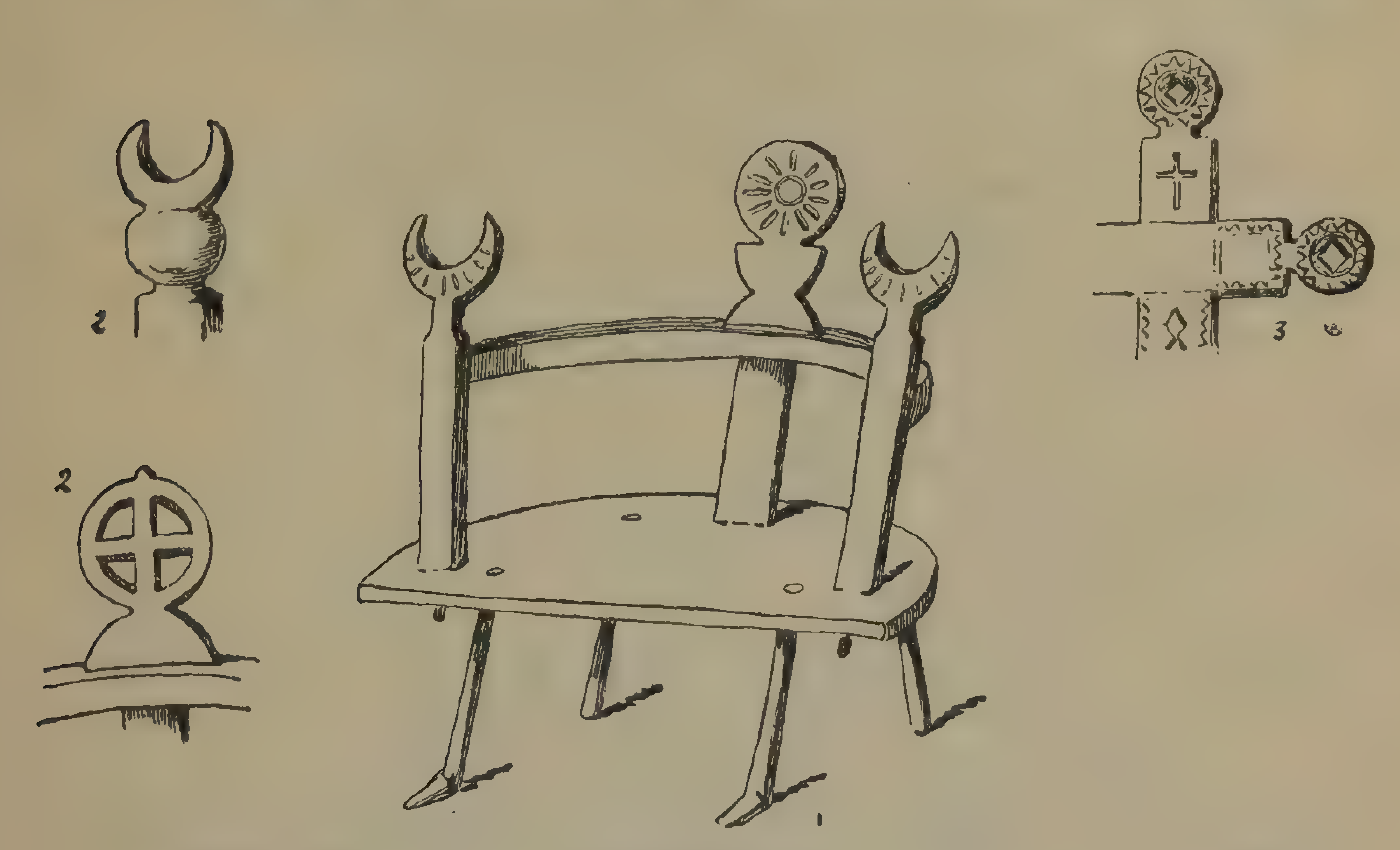
Albanian traditional carving patterns on chairs and graves, drawn by Edith Durham before 1928. They are representations of the Sun (Dielli) and the Moon (Hana), sometimes also rayed (symbolizing their light).

Prehistoric Illyrian symbols used on funeral monuments of the pre-Roman period have been used also in Roman times and continued into late antiquity in the broad Illyrian territory. The same motifs were kept with identical cultural-religious symbolism on various monuments of the early medieval culture of the Albanians. They appear also on later funerary monuments, including the medieval tombstones (stećci) in Bosnia and Herzegovina and the burial monuments used until recently in northern Albania, Kosovo, Montenegro, southern Serbia and northern North Macedonia. Such motifs are particularly related to the ancient cults of the Sun and Moon, survived until recently among northern Albanians.

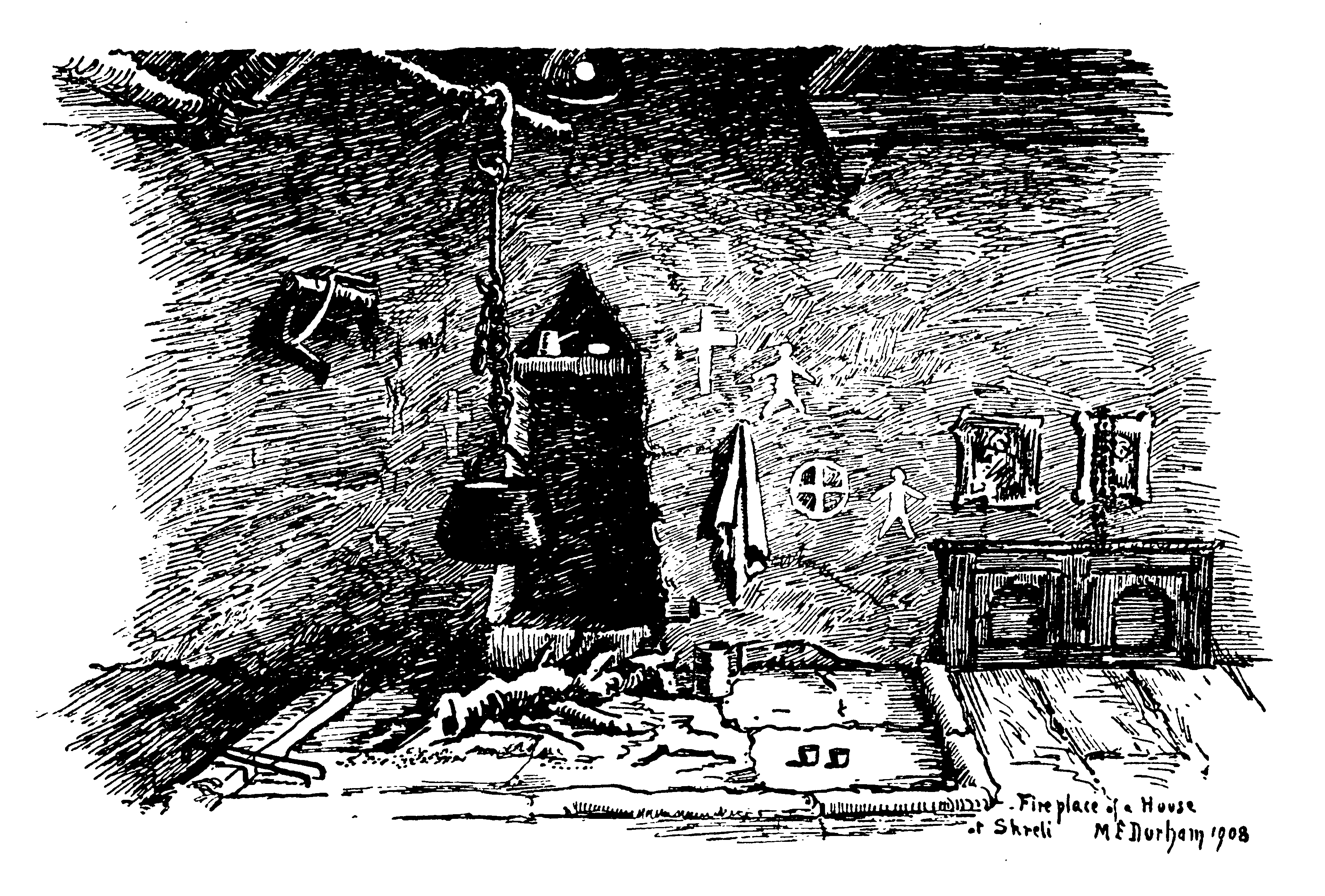
Fireplace (votër) of a house of Shkreli, northern Albania, drawn by Edith Durham in 1909.

Among the Illyrians of early Albania the Sun was a widespread symbol. The spread of a Sun cult and the persistence of Sun motifs into the Roman period and later are considered to have been the product of the Illyrian culture. In Christian iconography the symbol of the Sun is associated with immortality and a right to rule. The pagan cult of the Sun was almost identical to the Christian cult in the first centuries of Christianity. Varieties of the symbols of the Sun that Christian orders brought in the region found in the Albanian highlands sympathetic supporters, enriching the body of their symbols with new material.

The historical-linguistic determination of the Albanian Christian terminology provides evidence that Albanians have already joined the process of conversion to Christianity in the Balkans since the late antiquity (4th–5th centuries AD). The earliest church lexicon is mainly of Late Latin or Ecclesiastical Latin origin and, to a large extent, of native origin, which leads to the conclusion that the Christianisation of the Albanians occurred under the Latin-based liturgy and ecclesiastical order of the Holy See. Also according to Church documents, the territories that coincide with the present-day Albanian-speaking compact area had remained under the jurisdiction of the Bishop of Rome and used Latin as official language at least until the first half of the 8th century.

At the time of the South Slavic incursion and the threat of ethnic turbulence in the Albanian-inhabited regions, the Christianization of the Albanians had already been completed and it had apparently developed for Albanians as a further identity-forming feature alongside the ethnic-linguistic unity. Church administration, which was controlled by a thick network of Roman bishoprics, collapsed with the arrival of the Slavs. Between the early 7th century and the late 9th century the interior areas of the Balkans were deprived of church administration, and Christianity might have survived only as a popular tradition on a reduced degree. Some Albanians living in the mountains, who were only partially affected by Romanization, probably sank back into the Classic Paganism.

The reorganization of the Church as a cult institution in the region took a considerable amount of time. The Balkans were brought back into the Christian orbit only after the recovery of the Byzantine Empire and through the activity of Byzantine missionaries. The earliest church vocabulary of Middle Greek origin in Albanian dates to the 8th–9th centuries, at the time of the Byzantine Iconoclasm, which was started by the Byzantine Emperor Leo III the Isaurian. In 726 Leo III established de jure the jurisdiction of the Ecumenical Patriarchate of Constantinople over the Balkans, as the Church and the State established an institution. The Eastern Church expanded its influence in the area along with the social and political developments. Between the 7th and 12th centuries a powerful network of cult institutions were revived completely covering the ecclesiastical administration of the entire present-day Albanian-speaking compact area. In particular an important role was played by the Theme of Dyrrhachium and the Archdiocese of Ohrid. Survived through the centuries, the Christian belief among Albanians became an important cultural element in their ethnic identity. Indeed, the lack of Old Church Slavonic terms in Albanian Christian terminology shows that the missionary activities during the Christianization of the Slavs did not involve Albanian-speakers. In a text compiled around the beginning of the 11th century in the Old Bulgarian language, the Albanians are mentioned for the first time with their old ethnonym Arbanasi as half-believers, a term which for Eastern Orthodox Christian Bulgarians meant Catholic Christian. The Great Schism of 1054 involved Albania separating the region between Catholic Christianity in the north and Orthodox Christianity in the south.

Islam was first introduced to Albania in the 15th century after the Ottoman conquest of the area. In Ottoman times, often to escape higher taxes levied on Christian subjects, the majority of Albanians became Muslims. However one part retained Christian and pre-Christian beliefs. In the 16th century the Albanians are firstly mentioned as worshippers of the Sun and the Moon. British poet Lord Byron (1788–1824), describing the Albanian religious belief, reported that "The Greeks hardly regard them as Christians, or the Turks as Muslims; and in fact they are a mixture of both, and sometimes neither." In Ottoman times education in the Albanian language was forbidden. The folk storytellers have played an important role in preserving Albanian folklore. The lack of schools was compensated by the folk creativity, molding generations of Albanians with their forefathers' wisdom and experience and protecting them from assimilation processes.

Between the 16th and 18th centuries, in Albania arrived also the Bektashi Sufi order which spread widely among Albanians because of its traditional tolerance and regard for different religions, practices and beliefs and because it allowed itself to be a vehicle for the expression of Crypto-Christian, Christian and pre-Christian pagan beliefs and rituals. Bektashism is a Muslim dervish order (tariqat) thought to have originated in the 13th century in a frontier region of Anatolia, where Christianity, Islam and paganism coexisted, allowing the incorporation of comparable pagan and non-Muslim beliefs into popular Islam. It facilitated the conversion process to the new Muslims and became the official order of the Janissaries. After the ban of all the Sufi orders in Turkey in 1925, the Bektashi Order established its headquarters in Tirana.

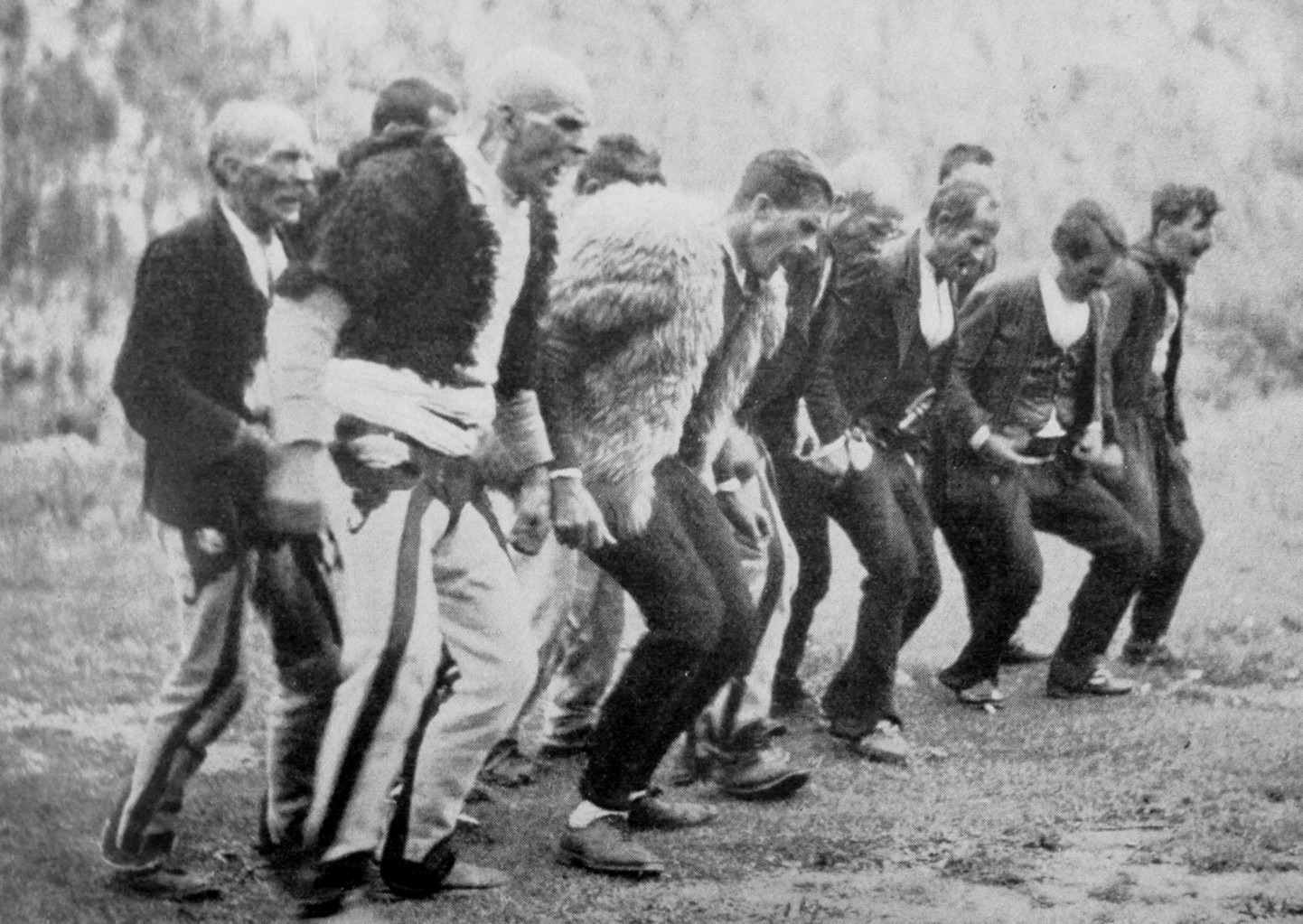
Men of Theth (Shala) practicing the gjâmë – the Albanian lamentation of the dead – in the funeral of Ujk Vuksani, 1937.

Since its founding in 1912, Albania has been a secular state, becoming atheist during the Communist regime, and returning secular after the fall of the regime. For half a century the regime in Albania anathemized all beliefs, without taking into account the fact that the Albanian traditional rites, customs, beliefs, mythology, etc. aligned Albanians – who have preserved a unique culture – with the major ancient groups of peoples.

Albanian folklore evolved over the centuries in a relative isolated tribal culture and society, and although several changes occurred in the Albanian belief system, an ancient layer of pre-Christian beliefs has survived until today. Ancient paganism persisted among Albanians, and within the inaccessible and deep interior it has continued to persist, or at most it was partially transformed by the Christian, Muslim and Marxist beliefs that were either to be introduced by choice or imposed by force.

Albanian traditions have been orally transmitted – through memory systems that have survived intact into modern times – down the generations and are still very much alive in the mountainous regions of Albania, Kosovo and western North Macedonia, as well as among the Arbëreshë in Italy and the Arvanites in Greece, and the Arbanasi in Croatia.

== Cosmology ==
=== Supreme entity, animated Nature, and Fate ===
Either in pagan-polytheistic or monotheistic contexts, the supreme entity in Albanian is referred to as Zojz(-i)/Zot(-i), Perëndi(-a), or Hy(-u)/Hyj(-i), always associated with the sky and light. In Albanian the god who rules the sky is referred to as i Bukuri i Qiellit ("the Beauty of the Sky"), a phrase that is used in pagan contexts for the Sun (Dielli), worshipped as the god of light, sky and weather, giver of life, health and energy, and all-seeing eye. As the wide set of cultic traditions dedicated to him indicates, the Albanian Sun-god appears to be an expression of the Proto-Indo-European Sky-god (Zot or Zojz in Albanian). The Sun, referred to as "the all-seeing (big) eye" is invoked in Albanian solemn oaths (be), and information about everything that happens on Earth is asked to the all-seeing Sun in ritual songs. The Fire – Zjarri – is deified as releaser of light and heat with the power to ward off darkness and evil, affect cosmic phenomena and give strength to the Sun, and as sustainer of the continuity between life and afterlife and between the generations.

The primeval religiosity of the Albanian mountains is expressed by a supreme deity who is the god of the universe and who is conceived through the belief in the fantastic and supernatural entities, resulting in an extremely structured imaginative creation. The components of Nature are animated and personified deities, so in Albanian folk beliefs and mythology the Sky (Qielli) with the clouds and lightning, the Sun (Dielli), the Moon (Hëna), and the stars (including Afërdita), the Fire (Zjarri) and the hearth (vatra), the Earth (Dheu/Toka) with the mountains, stones, caves, and water springs, etc., are cult objects, considered to be participants in the world of humans influencing the events in their life, and afterlife as well. Solemn oaths (Besa) and curse formulas involve and are addressed to, or taken by, the animated components of Nature.

The supreme god allows the existence of terrestrial female deities with their intervention in earthly events and interaction with humans. Hence the Albanian belief in zanas and oras (also fati or mira), who symbolize the vital energy and existential time of human beings respectively. The zana idealizes feminine energy, wild beauty, eternal youth and the joy of nature. They appear as warlike nymphs capable of offering simple mortals a part of their own psychophysical and divine power, giving humans strength comparable to that of the drangue. The ora represent the "moment of the day" (Albanian: koha e ditës) and the flowing of human destiny. As masters of time and place, they take care of humans (also of the zana and of some particular animals) watching over their life, their house and their hidden treasures before sealing their destiny. So, the goddesses of fate "maintain the order of the universe and enforce its laws" – "organising the appearance of humankind." However great his power, the supreme god holds an executive role as he carries out what has been already ordained by the fate goddesses.

=== Dualistic struggle – cosmic renewal ===
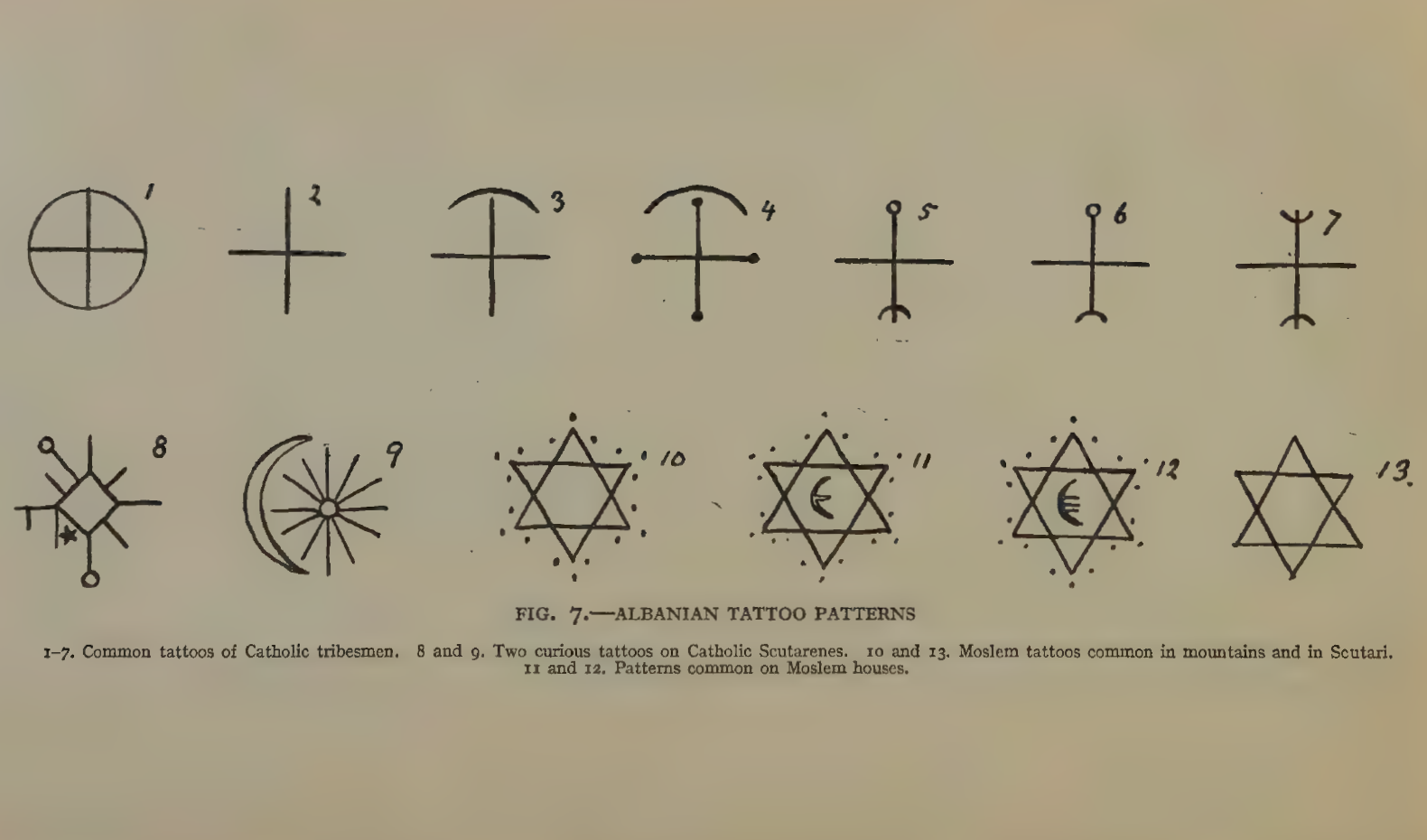
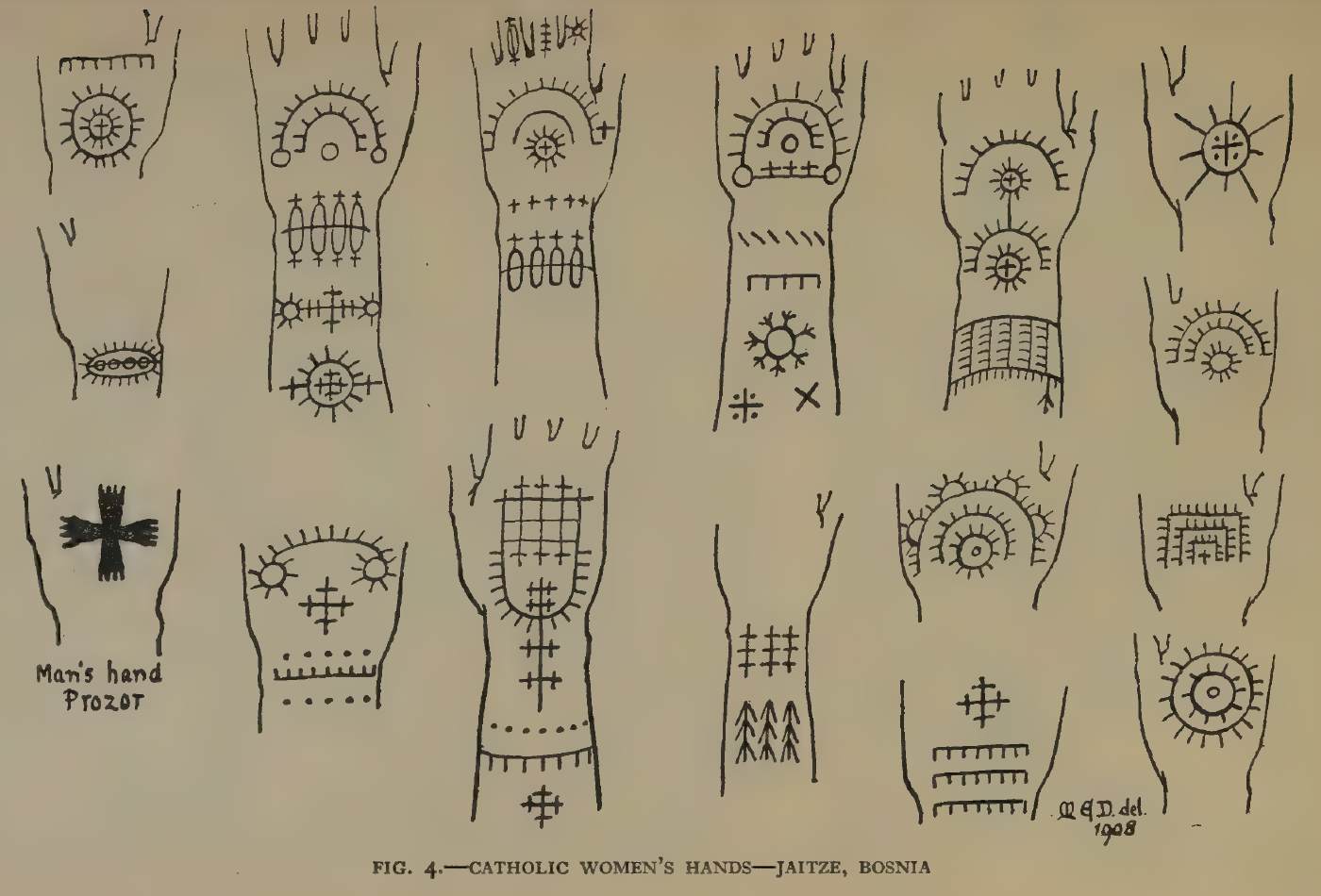
Tattoo patterns of northern Albanians (top); tattoo patterns of Catholic women (and one man) in Bosnia (bottom). Drawn by Edith Durham in the early 20th century. Many of those patterns also appear on Albanian traditional art (graves, jewellery, embroidery, and house carvings). They represent celestial, light, fire and hearth worship, expressing the favor of the light within the dualistic struggle between light and darkness.

Albanian beliefs, myths and legends are organized around the dualistic struggle between good and evil, light and darkness, which cyclically produces the cosmic renewal. Ritual calendar fires (Zjarret e Vitit) are practiced in relation to the cosmic cycle and the rhythms of agricultural and pastoral life, with the function to give strength to the Sun and to ward off evil according to the old beliefs. Exercising a great influence on Albanian major traditional feasts and calendar rites, the Sun (Dielli) is worshiped as the god of light and giver of life, who fades away the darkness of the world and melts the frost, allowing the renewal of Nature.

The most famous Albanian mythological representation of the dualistic struggle between good and evil, light and darkness, is the constant battle between drangue and kulshedra, a conflict that symbolises the cyclic return in the watery and chthonian world of death, accomplishing the cosmic renewal of rebirth. The legendary battle of a heroic deity associated with thunder and weather – like drangue – who fights and slays a huge multi-headed serpent associated with water, storms, and drought – like kulshedra – is a common motif of Indo-European mythology. The original legend may have symbolized the Chaoskampf, a clash between forces of order and chaos.

In Albanian tradition the clash between drangue and kulshedra, light and darkness, is furthermore seen as a mythological representation of the cult of the Sun and the Moon, widely observed in Albanian traditional tattooing and in other expressions of traditional art (graves, jewellery, embroidery, and house carvings). The supremacy of the deity of the sky – the light side – over that of the underworld – the dark side – is symbolized by the victory of celestial divine heroes against kulshedra, an earthly/chthonic deity or demon originating from darkness. Those celestial divine heroes are often drangue (the most widespread culture hero among Albanians), but also e Bija e Hënës dhe e Diellit ("the Daughter of the Moon and the Sun") who is referred to as pika e qiellit ("drop of the sky" or "lightning"), which falls everywhere from heaven on the mountains and the valleys and strikes pride and evil, or by other heroic characters marked in their bodies by the symbols of celestial objects, such as Zjermi (lit. 'the Fire'), who notably is born with the Sun on his forehead. The dualism between black/darkness and white/light is also remarkably represented by the Moon's phases, which symbolize both fertility (increase) and sterility (decrease). Moon's cyclical phases have regulated many aspects of the life of the Albanians, defining agricultural and livestock activities, various crafts, and human body.

== Cultic deities ==
=== Zojz, Qielli ===
Celestial symbols – double-headed eagle and six-pointed star/sun – on the official seal of Skanderbeg, the Lord of Albania (D · AL Dominus Albaniae).

Zojz is the sky and lightning god. Regarded as the chief god and the highest of all gods, traces of his worship survived in northern Albania until the early 20th century, and in some forms still continue today. The old beliefs in the Sky (Alb. Qielli) are pagan beliefs preserved by Albanians since ancient times. The sacred significance of one of the main symbols of the sky cult – the eagle – has been scrupulously preserved by Albanians, who have always considered it their animal totem. An epithet considered to be associated with the sky-god is "father", thought to be contained in the Albanian noun Zot ("Sky Father", from Proto-Albanian: *dźie̅u ̊ a(t)t-), used to refer to the Supreme Being. A remarkable reflection of Proto-Indo-European mythology associated with the dawn goddess *H₂éwsōs is the Albanian tradition according to which the dawn goddess – Prende – is the daughter of the sky god – Zojz.

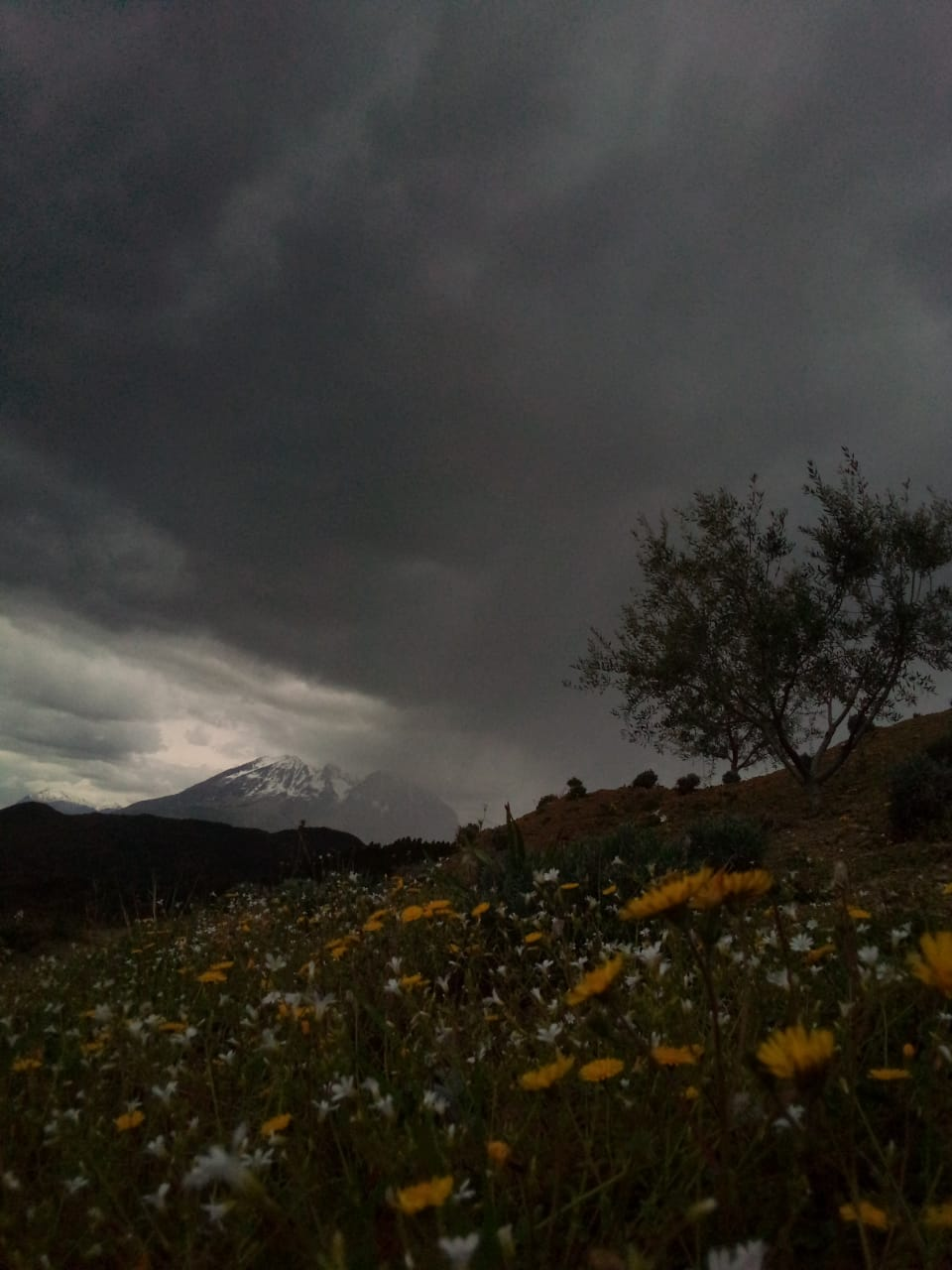
View of Mount Tomorr from the Tunja village.

In Albanian the god who rules the sky is referred to as i Bukuri i Qiellit ("the Beauty of the Sky"), a phrase that is used in pagan contexts for the Sun (Dielli), worshiped as the god of light, sky and weather, giver of life, health and energy, and all-seeing eye. The Albanian tradition according to which the Sun is an "eye", is a reflection of the Indo-European belief according to which the Sun is the eye of the Sky-God. Albanian folk beliefs regard the lightning as the "fire of the sky" (Zjarri i Qiellit) and consider it as the "weapon of the deity". Finding correspondences with Albanian folk beliefs and practices, early evidence of the celestial cult in Illyria is provided by 6th century BCE Illyrian plaques from Lake Shkodra, depicting simultaneously sacred representations of the sky and the sun, and symbolism of lightning and fire, as well as the sacred tree and birds (eagles); the Sun deity is animated with a face and two wings, throwing lightning into a fire altar. Albanian rituals to avert big storms with torrential rains, lightning, and hail, seek assistance from the supernatural power of the Fire (Zjarri, evidently also called with the theonym Enji). Albanian rituals for rainmaking invoke the Sky and the Sun. The cult practiced by the Albanians on several sacred mountains (notably on Mount Tomorr in central Albania) performed with pilgrimages, prayers to the Sun, ritual bonfires, and animal sacrifices, is considered a continuation of the ancient Indo-European sky-god worship. The cult of the Sky is also preserved in Albanian solemn oaths. The Sky (Qielli) is often paired with the Earth (Dheu) in Albanian oath swearings.

The Albanian divine culture hero drangue, who plays a dominant role in Albanian mythology, features the attributes of a sky and lightning deity, apparently an Albanian reflection of the Indo-European sky god. In some Albanian regions the lightning god who lives in the clouds in the sky is alternatively referred to as Shurdhi, Verbti, or Rmoria. Another possible name of the sky and lightning god could be Perëndi. An Albanian mythical tale concerning the highest of the gods, who uses thunderbolts to defeat the sea-storm god Talas, has been documented in the early 20th century from the Shala region in northern Albania.

=== Zonja e Dheut, Dheu ===
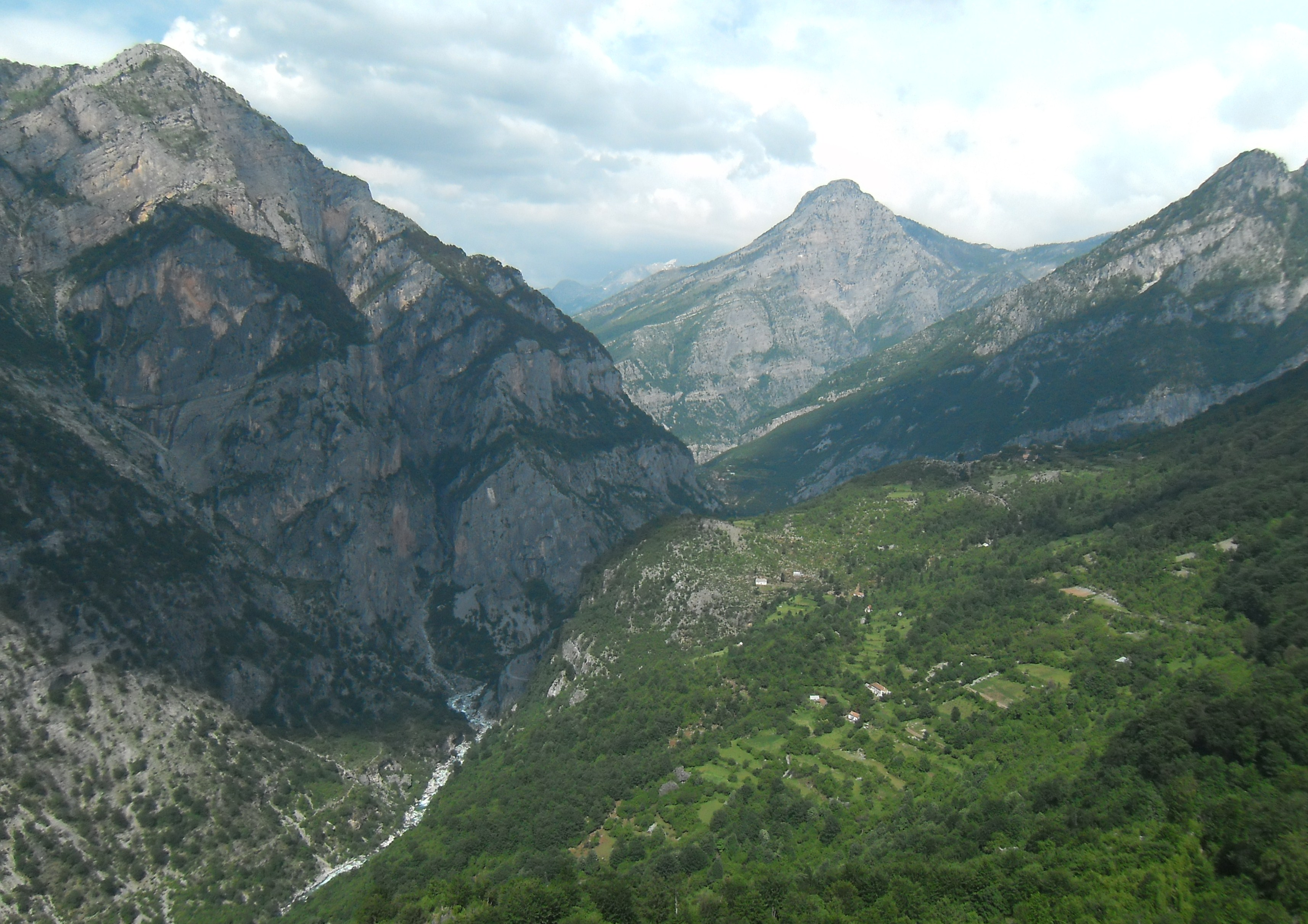
An instance of the Albanian worship of the Mother Earth is the veneration and deep respect that the people of Kelmend dedicate to her. For them environment is of great importance, and they are deeply attached to their territory, maintaining a balance that involves material aspects as well as cultural and spiritual aspects.

Zonja e Dheut (also Gheg Albanian: Zôja e Dheut) is used in Albanian to refer to the Earth Goddess. The Earth Mother Goddess or Great Mother (Magna Mater) is simply referred to as Dhé or Dheu in Albanian, and traces of her worship have been preserved in Albanian tradition. The Albanian noun Toka "The Earth" is also used to refer to the living Earth.

The fact that dhé "earth" is an Albanian inherited word from Proto-Indo-European, with ritualization in sacred contexts preserving its stability and density, highlights the important role of the earth in Albanian culture. Very serious Albanian oath swearings taken by earth, and many curse formulas based on the earth, also show the great significance of the earth cult in Albanian tradition.

The cult of the Earth Mother Goddess is expressed by the whorship of the female ancestor and maternal breasts, and by rituals and beliefs involving immurement and building (also with animal sacrifices), spring, renewal of nature and soil fertility, death and afterlife as the final dwelling of humans, pristine sacred places, and building plots.

Kroni (indefinite form: kron), krua, or kroi, is a hydronym widespread in Albanian inhabited territories. It is an ancient Albanian word, meaning "living water", "flowing water", "water spring". Some people believe that water is to the living Earth what blood is to the humans.

In Albanian culture the original female ancestor of the kin group (Alb. fis or farë) is referred to as the "mother of the home" representing the Great Mother, and she is often imagined as a serpent (see Vitore and Nëna e Vatrës). The serpent is a sacred animal totem of the Albanians. Regarded as an earth-deity, the serpent is euphemistically called with names that are derived from the Albanian words for earth, dhé and tokë: Dhetokësi, Dheu, Përdhesi, Tokësi or Itokësi.

The earth is often paired with the sky in Albanian oath swearings, e.g.: për qiell e dhé, pasha tokën e pasha qiellin, etc.

=== Dielli ===
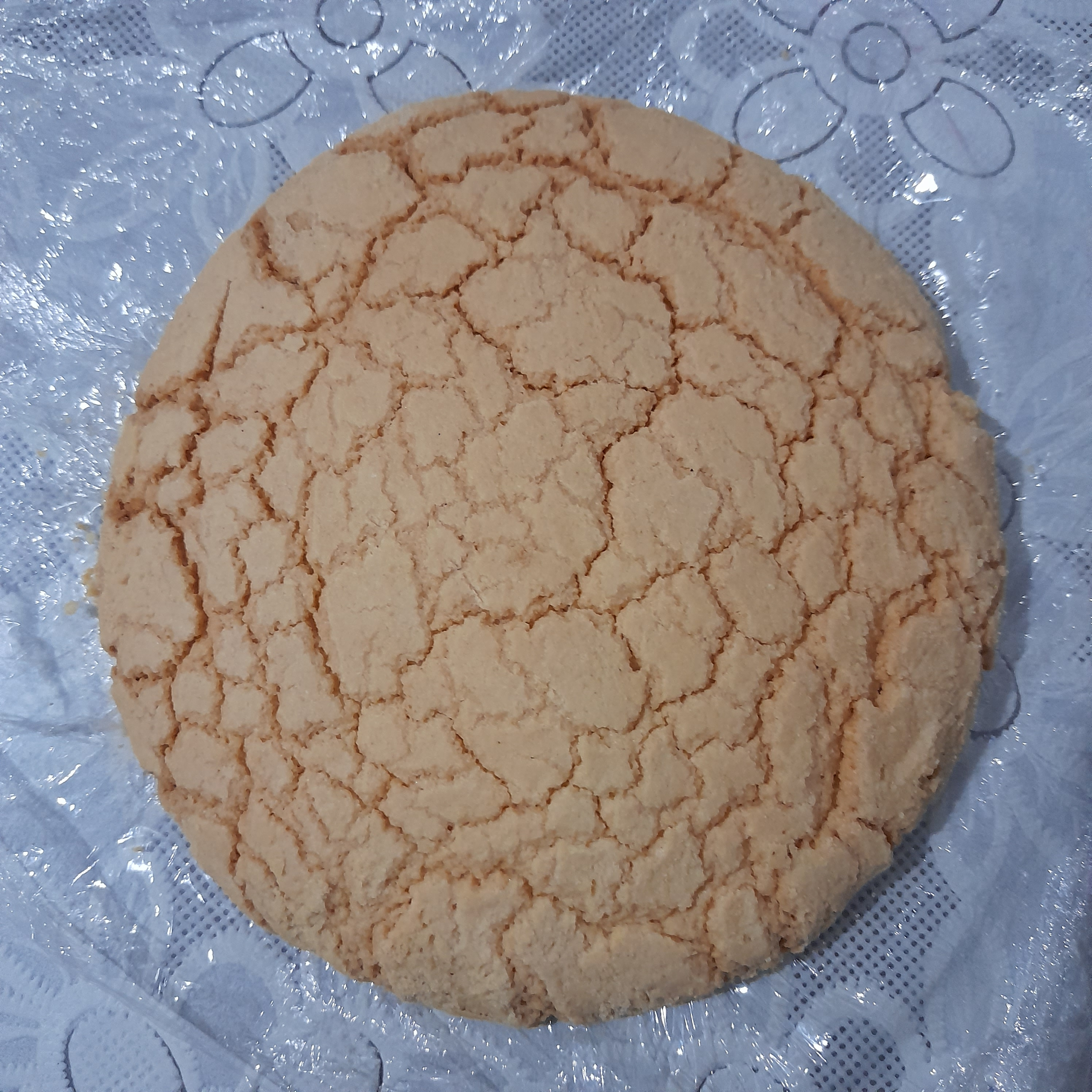
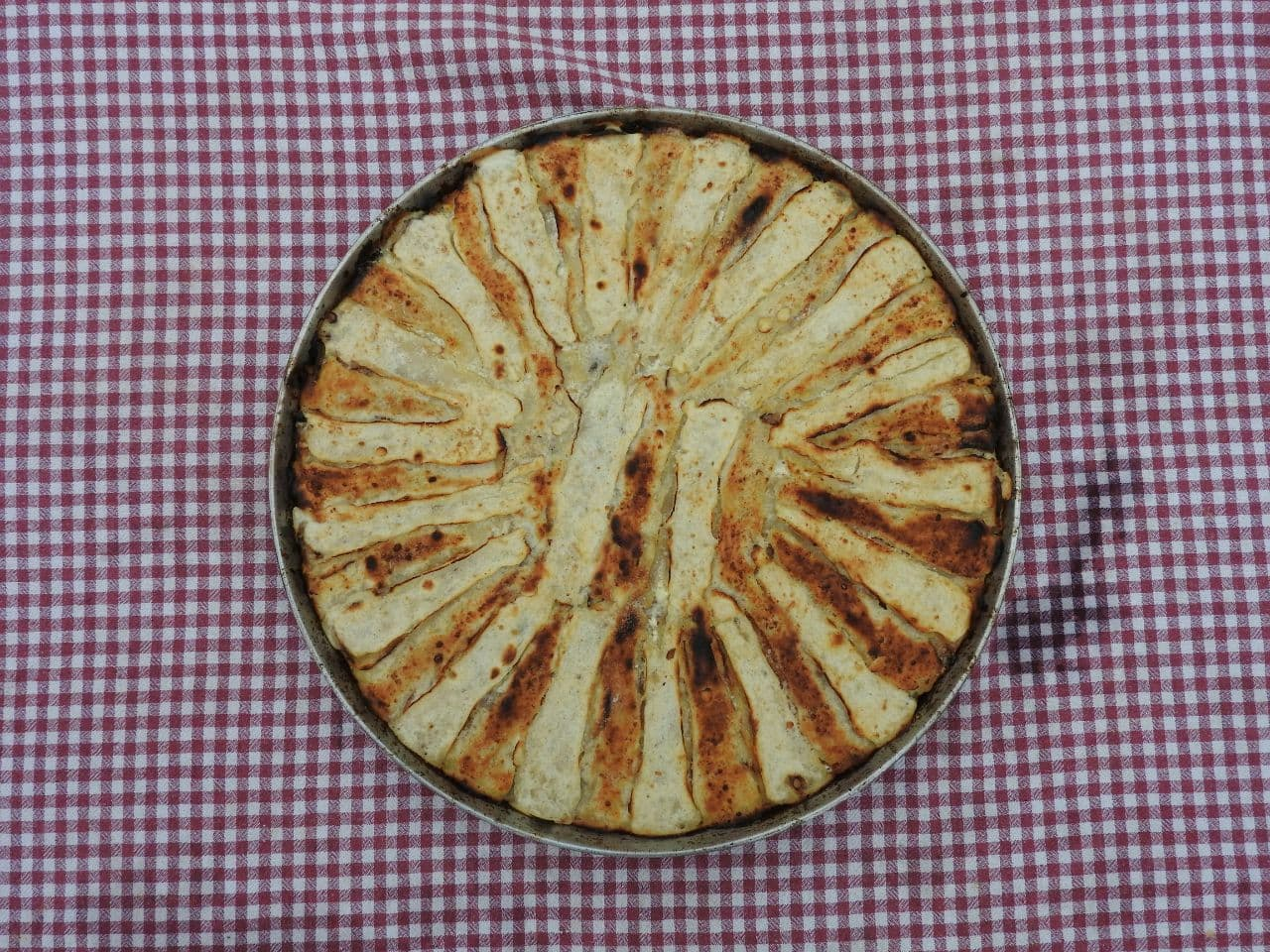
Ballokume, a cookie (left); Flia (meaning "sacrifice"), a dish (right). They are figurative representations of the Sun, traditionally prepared and eaten during Dita e Verës or Verëza – an Albanian pagan spring festival, celebrated by all Albanians (also officially in Albania) to drive away the darkness of the winter season allowing Nature's renewal and for the strengthening of the Sun, traditionally by litting bonfires in yards everywhere, especially on high places.

Dielli, the Sun, holds the primary role in Albanian pagan customs, beliefs, rituals, myths, and legends. Albanian major traditional festivities and calendar rites are based on the Sun, worshiped as the god of light, sky and weather, giver of life, health and energy, and all-seeing eye. In Albanian tradition the fire – zjarri, evidently also called with the theonym Enji – worship and rituals are particularly related to the cult of the Sun. Ritual calendar fires or bonfires are traditionally kindled before sunrise in order to give strength to the Sun. Many rituals are practiced before and during sunrise, honoring this moment of the day as it is believed to give energy and health to the body. As the wide set of cultic traditions dedicated to him indicates, the Albanian Sun-god appears to be an expression of the Proto-Indo-European Sky-god (Zot or Zojz in Albanian).

Albanians were firstly described in written sources as worshippers of the Sun and the Moon by German humanist Sebastian Franck in 1534, but the Sun and the Moon have been preserved as sacred elements of Albanian tradition since antiquity. Illyrian material culture shows that the Sun was the chief cult object of the Illyrian religion. Finding correspondences with Albanian folk beliefs and practices, the Illyrian Sun-deity is figuratively represented on Iron Age plaques from Lake Shkodra as the god of the sky and lightning, also associated with the fire altar where he throws lightning bolts. The symbolization of the cult of the Sun, which is often combined with the crescent Moon, is commonly found in a variety of contexts of Albanian folk art, including traditional tattooing, grave art, jewellery, embroidery, and house carvings. Solemn oaths (Besa), good omens, and curse formulas, involve and are addressed to, or taken by, the Sun. Prayers to the Sun, ritual bonfires, and animal sacrifices have been common practices performed by Albanians during the ritual pilgrimages on mountain tops.

In Albanian the god who rules the sky is referred to as i Bukuri i Qiellit ("the Beauty of the Sky"), a phrase that is used in pagan contexts for the Sun, the god of light and giver of life, who fades away the darkness of the world and melts the frost, allowing the renewal of Nature. According to folk beliefs, the Sun makes the sky cloudy or clears it up. Albanian rituals for rainmaking invoke the Sky and the Sun. In Albanian tradition the Sun is referred to as an "eye", which is a reflection of the Indo-European belief according to which the Sun is the eye of the Sky-God *Di̯ḗu̯s (Zojz in Albanian tradition). According to folk beliefs, the Sun is all-seeing, with a single glance he possesses the ability to see the entire surface of the Earth. The Sun, referred to as "the all-seeing (big) eye" is invoked in solemn oaths (be), and information about everything that happens on Earth is asked to the all-seeing Sun in ritual songs. In Albanian pagan beliefs and mythology the Sun is animistically personified as a male deity. The Moon (Hëna) is his female counterpart. In pagan beliefs the fire hearth (vatra e zjarrit) is the symbol of fire as the offspring of the Sun. In some folk tales, myths and legends the Sun and the Moon are regarded as husband and wife, also notably appearing as the parents of E Bija e Hënës dhe e Diellit ("the Daughter of the Moon and the Sun"); in others the Sun and the Moon are regarded as brother and sister, but in this case they are never considered consorts. Nëna e Diellit ("the Mother of the Sun" or "the Sun's Mother") also appears as a personified deity in Albanian folk beliefs and tales.

==== Nëna e Diellit ====
Nëna e Diellit is the Mother of the Sun (Dielli). A sacred ritual called "the funeral of the Sun's Mother" was very widespread in southeastern Albania until the 20th century. She has been described by scholars as a heaven goddess and a goddess of agriculture, livestock, and earth fertility, as suggested by the sacred ritual dedicated to her. Nëna e Diellit also features as a deity in Albanian folk tales. Nëna e Diellit represents a manifestation of the personification of the Sun in Albanian mythology.

=== Hëna ===
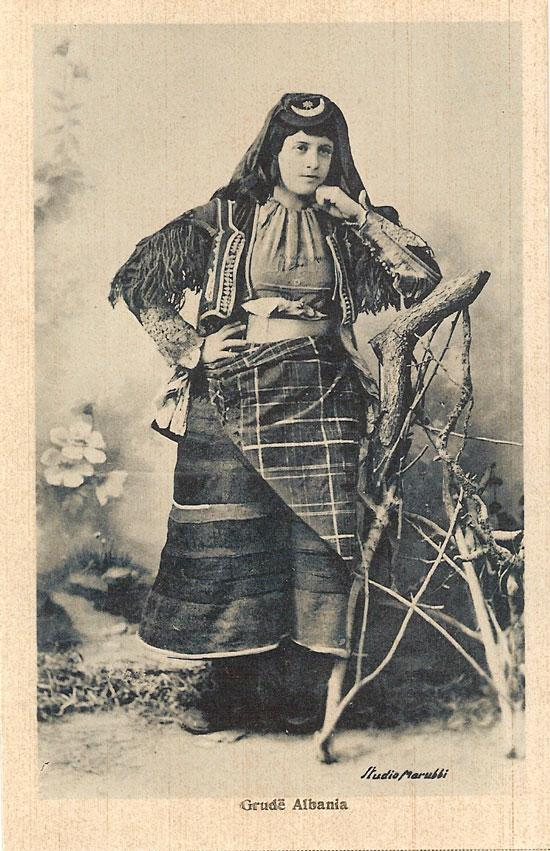
The sun/star and the crescent moon stitched to the crown of the headgear of a woman of the Gruda tribe. This fashion was very common among Catholic women of all the northern Albanian tribes.

Hëna, the Moon, holds a prominent position in Albanian culture, with Moon's cyclical phases regulating many aspects of the life of the Albanians, defining agricultural and livestock activities, various crafts, and human body.

Albanians were firstly described in written sources as worshippers of the Sun and the Moon by German humanist Sebastian Franck in 1534, but the Sun and the Moon have been preserved as sacred elements of Albanian tradition since antiquity. The symbolization of the crescent Moon, often combined with the Sun, is commonly found in a variety of contexts of Albanian folk art, including traditional tattooing, grave art, jewellery, embroidery, and house carvings.

In Albanian pagan beliefs and mythology the Moon is a personified female deity, and the Sun (Dielli) is her male counterpart. In some folk tales, myths and legends the Moon and the Sun are regarded as wife and husband, also notably appearing as the parents of E Bija e Hënës dhe e Diellit ("the Daughter of the Moon and the Sun"); in others the Sun and the Moon are regarded as brother and sister, but in this case they are never considered consorts. In Old Albanian the name Hana/Hanë was attested also as a theonym – the Albanian rendering of Roman goddess Diana.

=== Prende, Afër-dita ===
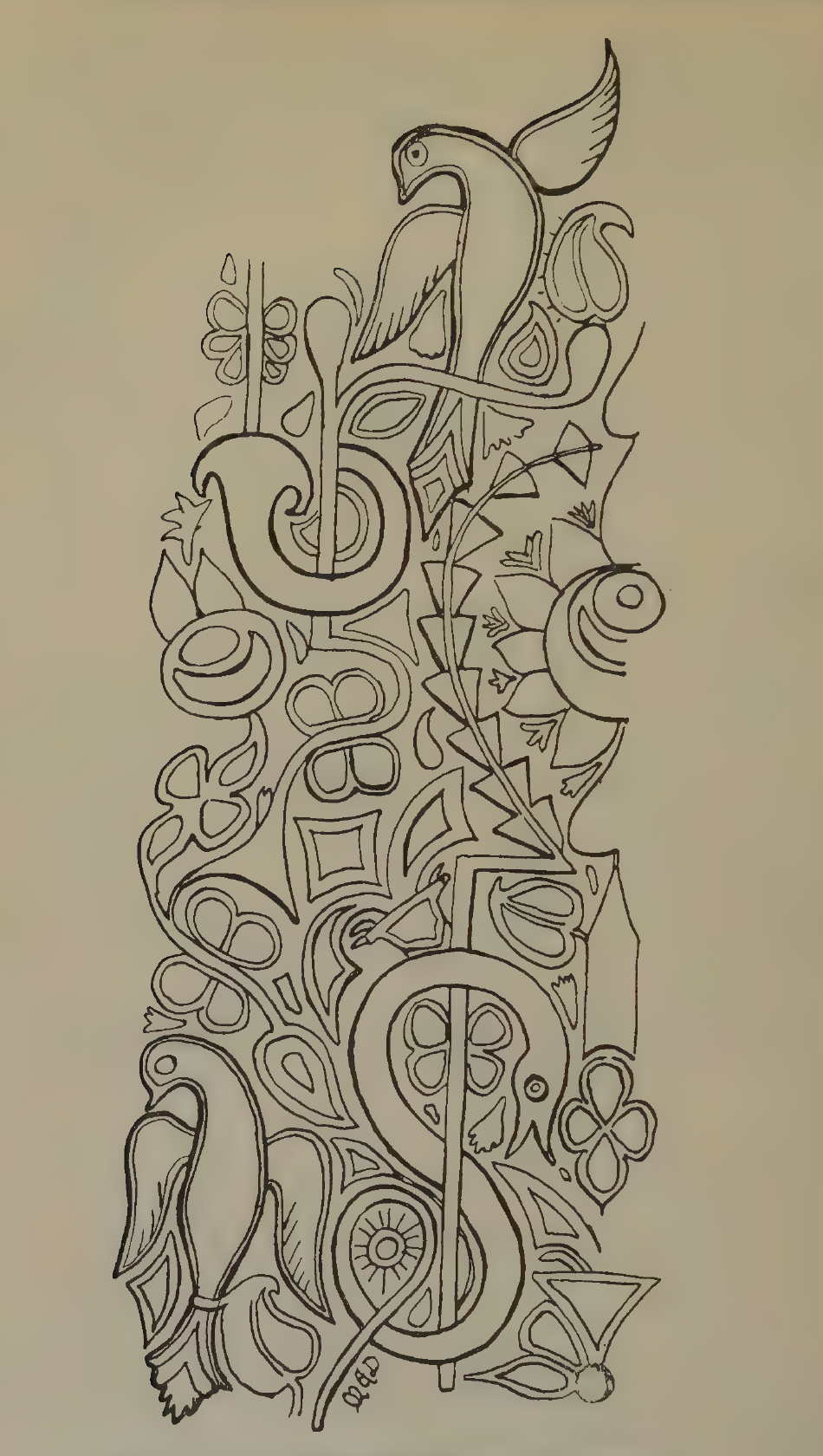
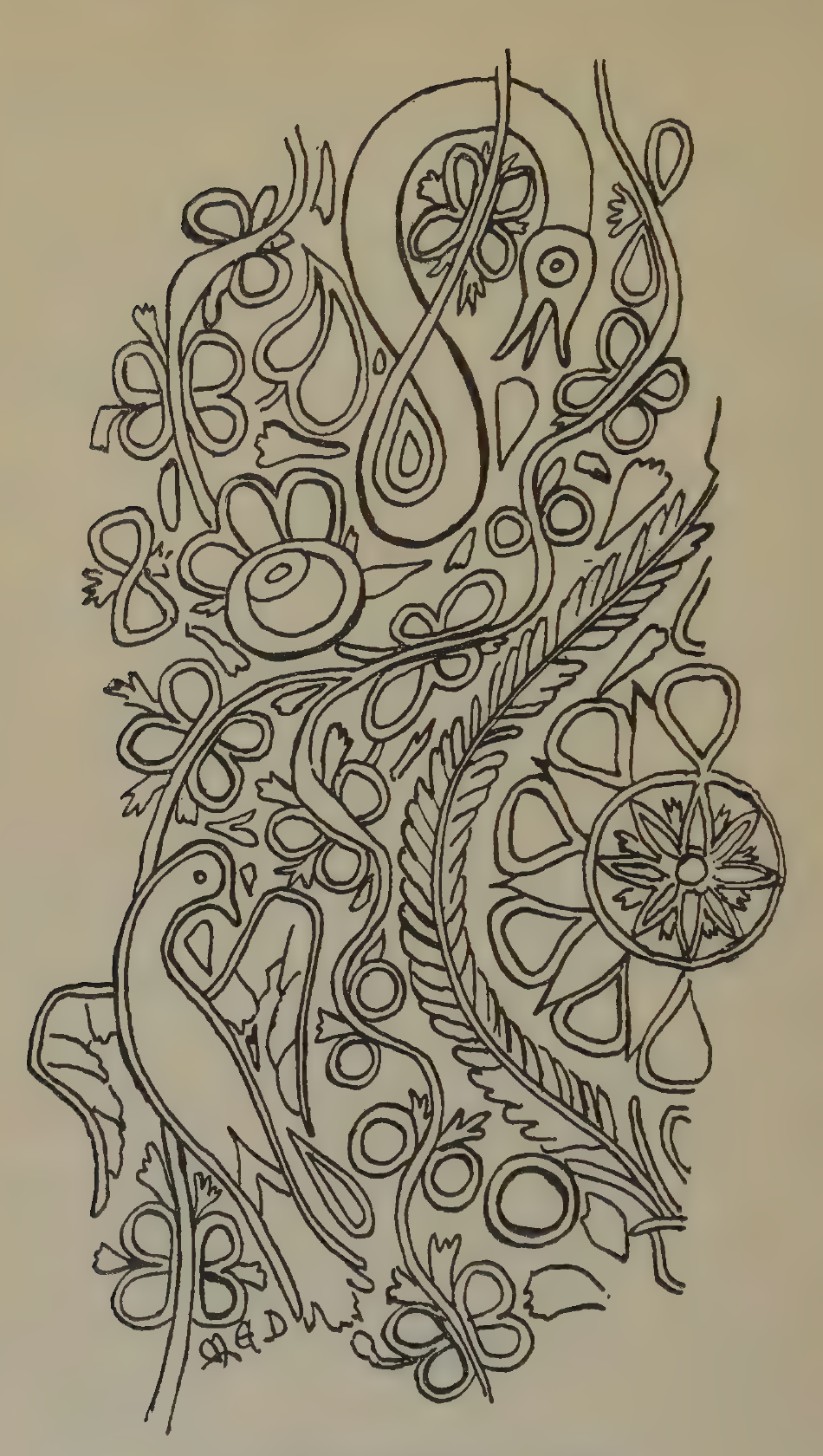
Albanian traditional art with an elaborate design representing the sun, serpent, bird (dove), wheat and flowering plant. Embroidered on the scarlet cloak that is traditionally given on the weddingday by the bridegroom to the bride (Catholic of Shkodra), the pattern suggests a fertility cult. Drawn by Edith Durham in the early 20th century.

Prende or Premte is the dawn goddess and goddess of love, beauty, fertility, health and protector of women. She is also called Afër-dita, an Albanian phrase meaning "near day", "the day is near", or "dawn", (Note: Afërdita or Gheg Albanian: Afêrdita is the native Albanian name of the planet Venus; Afro-dita is its Albanian imperative form meaning "come forth the day/dawn".) in association with the cult of the planet Venus, the morning and evening star. (Note: Albanian: (h)ylli i dritës, Afërdita "the Star of Light, Afërdita" (i.e. Venus, the morning star) and (h)ylli i mbrëmjes, Afërdita (i.e. Venus, the evening star).) Her sacred day is Friday, named in Albanian after her: e premte, premtja (Gheg Albanian: e prende, prendja). She is referred to as Zoja Prenne or Zoja e Bukuris ("Goddess/Lady Prenne" or "Goddess/Lady of Beauty"). In Albanian mythology Prende appears as the daughter of Zojz, the Albanian sky and lightning god.

Thought to have been worshiped by the Illyrians in antiquity, Prende is identified with the cult of Venus and she was worshipped in northern Albania, especially by the Albanian women, until recent times. She features attributes of Aphrodite, Iris, and Helen, as well as Persephone as shown by the etymology of her name. Describing a goddess of the underworld and at the same time a personification of springtime, the Albanian e Bukura e Dheut ("the Beauty of the Earth") is evidently an epithet of the Albanian equivalent of Persephone.

When Christians were the majority in Albania, she was called ShënePremte or Shën Prende ("Saint Veneranda"), identified by the Catholic Church as Saint Anne, mother of Virgin Mary. She was so popular in Albania that over one in eight of the Catholic churches existing in the late 16th and the early 17th centuries were named after her. Many other historical Catholic and Orthodox churches were dedicated to her in the 18th and 19th centuries.

=== Enji, Zjarri ===
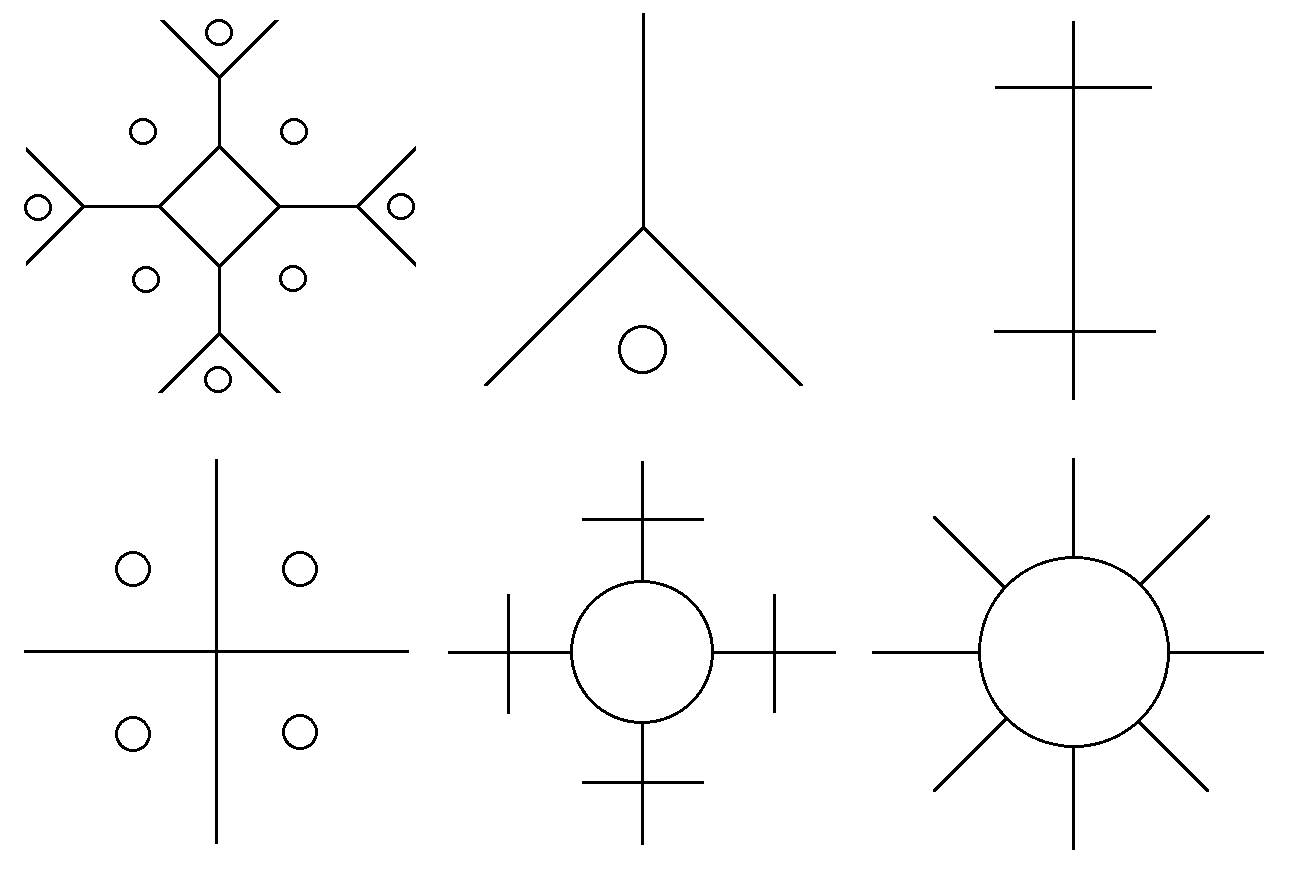
Sun (Dielli) and Fire symbols in Albanian traditional tattoo patterns (19th century). The cross (also swastika in some tattoos) is the Albanian traditional way to represent the deified Fire – Zjarri, evidently also called with the theonym Enji. Also appearing in other expressions of Albanian traditional art, they represent celestial, light, fire and hearth worship, expressing the favor of the light within the dualistic struggle between light and darkness.

Enji (Albanian: [ɛɲi]) is the old name of the fire god, evidently contained in the week day name that was dedicated to him – e enjte – the Albanian word for Thursday. The Fire – Zjarri – is deified in Albanian tradition as releaser of light and heat with the power to ward off darkness and evil, affect cosmic phenomena and give strength to the Sun, and as sustainer of the continuity between life and afterlife and between the generations. The divine power of Fire is used for the hearth and the rituals, including calendar fires, sacrificial offerings, divination, purification, and protection from big storms and other potentially harmful events. Fire worship and rituals are associated with the cult of the Sun (Dielli), the cult of the hearth (vatër) and the ancestor, and the cult of fertility in agriculture and animal husbandry. Fire rituals that are commonly found among Indo-European peoples, including the Albanians, have been firstly attested by the Vedas, with hymns dedicated to the fire god Agni. Described in written sources since 1482, the Albanian practices associated with ritual fires have been historically fought by the Christian clergy, without success. The cult of the mystic fire and the fire ritual practices have played a prominent role in the lives of all the Albanian people until the 20th century, and in rural areas they continue to be important for Albanian traditional customs even in the present days.

The theonym from which Thursday was named in Albanian is considered to have been attested in antiquity in Illyrian theophoric names with the Latin spelling En(n)-. He was presumably worshiped by the Illyrians in antiquity and he may have been the most prominent god of the Albanian pantheon in Roman times by interpreting Jupiter, when week-day names were formed in the Albanian language. The belief in a prominent fire and wind god, who was referred to as I Verbti ("the blind one"), and who was often regarded more powerful than the Christian God, survived in northern Albania until recent times. Under Christianization the god of fire was demonized and considered a false god, and it was spread about that anyone who invoked him would be blinded by fire. The purifying power of fire underlies the Albanian folk belief according to which the fire god is the enemy of uncleanliness and the opponent of filth.

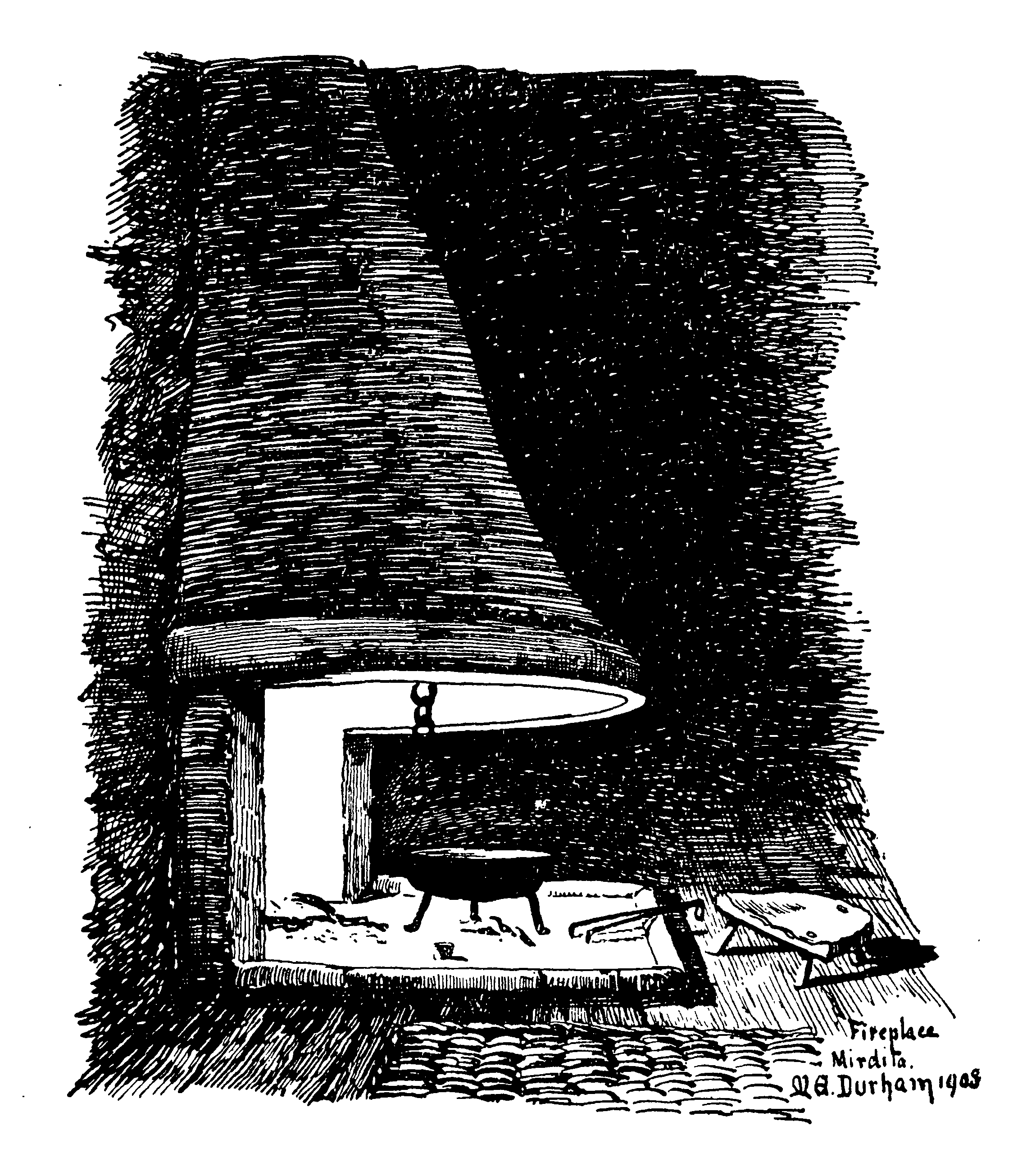
Hearth fire lighting a dark room in a house of Mirdita, northern Albania. Drawn by Edith Durham in 1909.

In Albanian tradition Fire is deeply respected. To spit into it is taboo. Albanian solemn oaths are taken "by fire", and the worst curse formulas are cast for the extinguishing of the individual's, family's and clan's fire. The lineage is identified with an original fire, and the members of a same tribe/clan are "from the same fire". Zjarri i Vatrës ("the Fire of the Hearth") is regarded as the offspring of the Sun and the sustainer of the continuity between the world of the living and that of the dead and between the generations, ensuring the survival of the lineage (fis or farë). The absence of fire in a house is traditionally considered a great curse. Protectors of the hearth are Gjarpri i Vatrës ("the Serpent of the Hearth"), a household benign serpent, and Nëna e Vatrës ("the Mother of the Hearth"). Zjarret e Vitit ("Ritual Calendar Fires") are associated with the cosmic cycle and the rhythms of agricultural and pastoral life. The ritual collective fires (based on the house, kinship, or neighborhood) or bonfires in yards (especially on high places) lit before sunrise to celebrate the main traditional Albanian festivities such as Dita e Verës (spring equinox), Shëngjergji, Shën Gjini–Shën Gjoni (summer solstice), the winter festivals (winter solstice), or mountain pilgrimages, often accompanied by animal sacrifices, are related to the cult of the Sun, and in particular they are practiced with the function to give strength to the Sun and to ward off evil according to the old beliefs. Zjarri i Gjallë, Zjarri i Egër, or Zjarri i Keq – traditionally kindled with rudimentary fire making tools and techniques – is the ritual purifying Fire used for the cleansing, protection, healing, and energizing of livestock and humans. Albanian folk beliefs regard the lightning as Zjarri i Qiellit ("the Fire of the Sky") and consider it as the "weapon of the deity". During big storms with torrential rains, lightning and hail, which often cause great damage to agriculture, livestock, and to the rural economy in general, Albanians traditionally bring outdoors Fire as a continuous chain or in a container, as well as ember and fire-related metallic objects, seeking assistance from the supernatural power of the Fire, in order to turn the storm away and to avert the harms it can cause to the community.

== Sacred animals ==
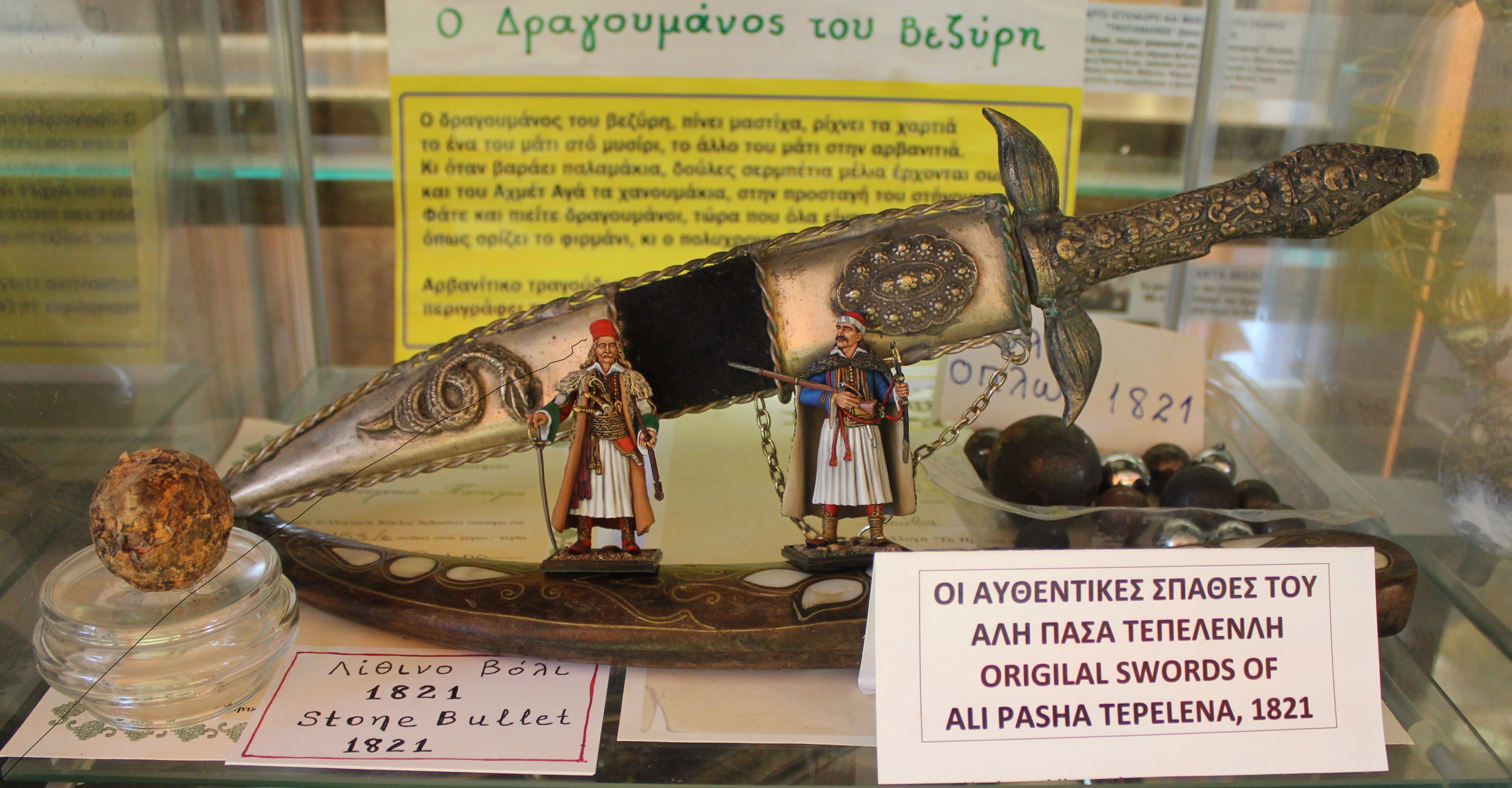
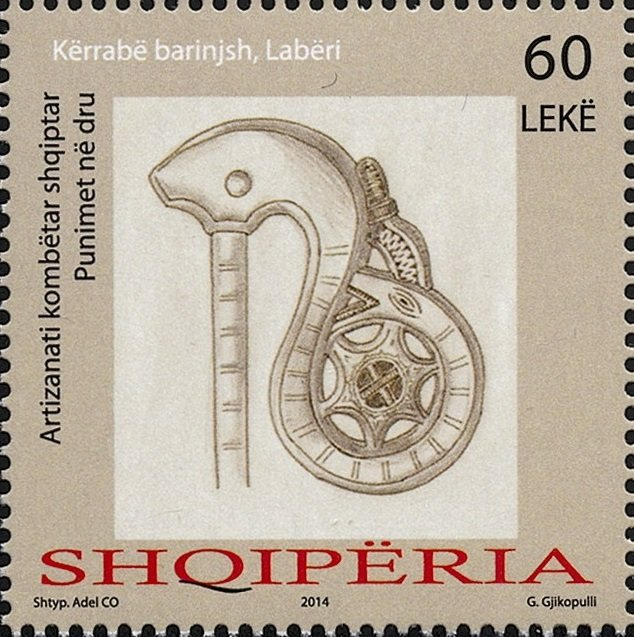
A serpent (gjarpër) carved on the sheath of an original sword of the Albanian ruler Ali Pasha Tepelena (left).
A serpent-shaped shepherd's crook from Labëria, depicted on a 2014 postage stamp of Albania (right).
- Shqiponja, the eagle: the animal totem of the Albanian people, associated with the Sky, freedom and heroism
- Bleta, the bee: associated with human life. When an animal ceases to live, Albanians use the verb ngordh or cof; when a bee ceases to live, they use the verb vdes (which is used to refer to human death). Meaning that for Albanians bees are beings of a higher caste, like humans.
- Gjarpri, the serpent: an animal totem of Albanians, associated with earth, water, sun, hearth and ancestor cults, as well as destiny, good fortune and fertility
  - Dhe-tokësi, dheu or tokësi: chthonic serpent
  - Bolla: water serpent
- Dreri, the deer: associated with sun cult
- Dhia e egër, the wild goat: associated with forests cult
- Kali, the horse: the most distinguished Indo-European cultic animal
- Kau, the ox: associated with earth and agriculture
- Bukla, the stoat
- Ujku, the wolf

== Mythical beings ==
- Nymph-like beings
  - Nuse Mali: mountain nymphs
    - Zana e malit, Ora, Bardha, Shtojzovalle, Jashtësme, Të Lumet Natë, Mira, E Bukura e Dheut (the earthly beauty)
  - Nuse uji: water nymphs
    - Zana e ujit, Nusja Shapulicë, Cuca e Liqenit, Ksheta, Perria; E Bukura e Detit (the beauty of the sea), Floçka
- Serpentine dragons
  - Bolla→Bollar→Errshaja→Kulshedra
  - Ljubi
  - Stihi
  - Sprija
  - Llamja (half snake-half woman monster that seduces men and eats children)
- Speaking animals with human emotions and oracular abilities
  - Birds
  - Serpents
  - Horses
- Abe (phantom wearing a cloak)
- Angu (shapeless ghost who appears in dreams)
- Avullushe (spirits that suffocate people with their breath)
- Baba Tomor (father of all gods)
- Bardha (pale, nebulous spirits who dwell under the earth)
- Bariu i mirë (the good shepherd)
- Baloz (dark knight, huge monster)
- Bushi i kënetës: bull of ponds and swamps which can cause rain by bellowing
- Bushtra (bad omen-wishing female witch)
- Çakalloz (mighty being, slightly deranged hero)
- Dedalija (hero who kills the Katallan)
- Dhampir (half-vampire, half-human)
- Dhevështruesi (half human and half animal)
- Dhamsutë (deaf and dumb mare)
- Djall (god of death and evil)
- Divi (ogre)
- Drangue (winged warrior that kills dragons)
- Dreq (devils)
- Fierkuqja (venomous lizard that hides in red ferns)
- Flama (restless evil ghost)
- Floçka (water nymph)
- Gjysmagjeli
- Gogol (bogeyman)
- Golden horned goats (wild goats protectors of the forests)
- Grabofç (monstrous two headed snake)
- Hajnjeri (man eating giant)
- Hija (shadow ghost)
- Jashtësme (elf-like nymphs that live in forests)
- Judi (giant ghost)
- Kacamisri (similar to Tom Thumb)
- Karkanxholl (goblins)
- Katallan (giant), having its origins in the Catalan Company's brutality in the Catalan Campaign in Asia Minor.
- Katravesh (the four-eared one, man-eating monster)
- Keshete (naiad)
- Kolivilor (demon similar to an incubus)
- Kore (child eating demon)
- Kukudh (blind female demon that spreads diseases)
- Lahin (dwarf-like goblin))
- Laura (shapeshifting swamp hag)
- Lugat (revenant)
- Magjí (evil woman, old hag))
- Makth (nightmare ghost that suffocates people during sleep)
- Mauthia (spirit of the earth and mountains)
- Mira (Spirits of fate)
- Pëlhurëza (veil ghost)
- Perria (beautiful female jinn who bedazzles humans)
- Qeros (Scurfhead)
- Qose (Barefaced Man)
- Rrqepta (similar to a beast)
- Rusale (mermaid)
- Shtojzovalle (forest spirits)
- Shtriga (vampiric witch)
- Syqeni (the Doggy Eyed, a wizard)
- Thopçi or Herri (gnome)
- Three headed dog (Hellhound)
- Vampire
- Vdekja (grim reaper)
- Vitore (snake spirit that lays gold coins and protects the home from evil)
- Vurvolaka (Vampiric ghouls)
- Xhindi (jinn)

== Hero cult ==
=== Heroic characters ===
The Albanian terms for "hero" are trim (female: trimneshë), kreshnik or hero (female: heroinë). Some of the main heroes of the Albanian epic songs, legends and myths are:

==== E Bija e Hënës dhe e Diellit ====
E Bija e Hënës dhe e Diellit "the Daughter of the Moon and the Sun" is described as pika e qiellit, "the drop of the sky or lightning", which falls everywhere from heaven on the mountains and the valleys and strikes pride and evil. She fights and defeats the kulshedra.

==== Drangue ====
Drangue is a semi-human winged warrior who fights the kulshedra; his most powerful weapons are lightning-swords and thunderbolts, but he also uses meteoric stones, piles of trees and rocks;

In Albanian paganism, there is a unique tradition about children born with the essence of dragons. These children are believed to be born with dragon wings, symbolizing their deep connection to ancient, powerful forces. As infants, they have the ability to fly, but their wings must remain unseen, as it is believed that if anyone witnesses them, it would bring death to the onlooker. To protect both the child and others, their wings are cut while they are still young, ensuring their secret remains hidden. Although the wings are removed, the strength and spirit of the dragon live on within them.

==== Zjermi and Handa ====
Zjermi and Handa are the protagonists of the heroic folktale "The Twins". Zjerma (lit. 'fire') was born with the sun in the forehead, while Handa (lit. 'moon') was born with the moon in the forehead. They have two horses and two dogs as companions, and two silver swords as weapons. Zjermi slays the kulshedra and defeats the shtriga, rescuing his brother Handa. In a variant of the tale Zjermi also rescues a drangue called Zef and then they become blood brothers and fight in alliance with other drangue the kulshedra.

==== Muji and Halili ====
Muji and Halili are the protagonists of epic cycle of the Kângë Kreshnikësh

==== Others ====
- Gjergj Elez Alia
- Little Constantine

=== Heroic motifs ===
The Albanian heroic songs are substantially permeated by the concepts contained in the Kanun, a code of Albanian oral customary laws: honor, considered as the highest ideal in Albanian society; shame and dishonor, regarded as worse than death; besa and loyalty, gjakmarrja.

Another characteristic of Albanian heroic songs are weapons. Their importance and the love which the heroes have for them are carefully represented in the songs, while they are rarely described physically. A common feature appearing in these songs is the desire for fame and glory, which is related to the courage of a person.

== Concepts ==
- Kanun, the Albanian traditional customary law
- Good and Evil, Light and Darkness
- Fate: Fatí (among Tosks), Ora (among Ghegs)
- Zjarri, the Fire
  - Zjarri i Vatrës, "the Fire of the Hearth"
  - Zjarri i Gjallë, Zjarri i Egër, Zjarri i Keq, "Ritual Purifying Fire"
  - Zjarret e Vitit, "Ritual calendar Fires"
  - Zjarri i Qiellit, "the Fire of the Sky" ("Lightning")
- Besa/Beja (oath swearing)
  - me diell (by sun), me dhè (by earth), me zjarr (by fire), me fushë (by field), me gur/gur-rrufeje (by stone/thunder-stone), me hënë (by moon), me mal (by mountain), me qiell (by sky), me ujë (by water), me toks (by snake)
- Mikpritja (hospitality)
- Gjakmarrja (blood feud)
- Numbers
- Nxiri: all-seeing eyes that look at humans from the ground following their movements everywhere, considered to be the sight of the living Earth
- Fryma, Hija, Shpirti (the Soul)
- Rebirth
- Animism
- Totemism
- Ancestor worship
- Syri i Keq (the evil eye)
- Yshtje (incantation)
- Ditët e Plakës (Old Woman's Days, a belief about the last cold days of winter)
- Shetuar or shituar: person that has been paralyzed/petrified by a zana

== Rituals and practices ==
- Childbirth rituals
- Wedding rituals
  - Shamia e Beqarit
- Vajtim, Gjâmë
- Murana (burial mounds of stones, tumuli for the cult of the ancestor / hero)
- Sacrifices
  - Animal sacrifices
- Calendar rituals
  - Winter rituals
    - Winter solstice rituals
  - Spring rituals
    - Spring equinox rituals
    - Shëngjergji rituals
  - Summer rituals
    - Summer solstice rituals
      - Shëngjini–Shëngjoni
    - Prende
    - Tomorr and other mountains
  - Autumn rituals
- Mountain pilgrimage rituals
- Albanian traditional tattooing
- Apotropaic rituals
- Healing rituals
- Evil eye rituals
- Divinatory rituals

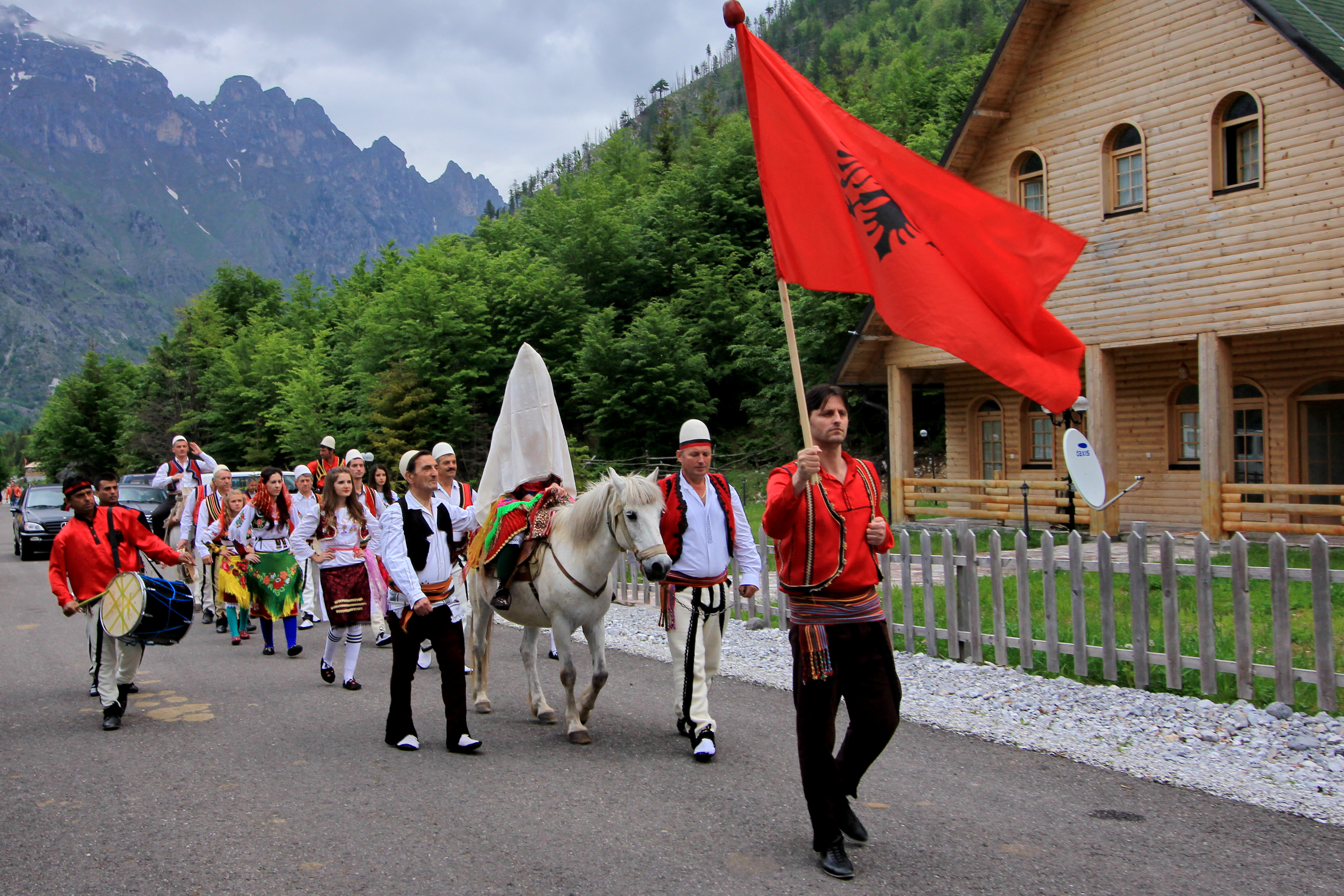
Bride-taking ceremony from Valbonë, northern Albania. In old Albanian tradition the groom went with his party made up of men of his family on horseback to the bride's home to ask for her hand and thereafter take her to his home, where the wedding reception was held.

- Fire rituals: Zjarri
  - Calendar fires: Zjarret e Vitit, associated with the cosmic cycle and the rhythms of agricultural and pastoral life
  - Purifying fire: Zjarri i Gjallë, Zjarri i Egër, Zjarri i Keq, used for the purification and healing of livestock and humans
  - Hearth fire: Zjarri i Vatrës, associated with the cult of the hearth (vatër)
  - Protector fire against big storms and other potentially harmful events: by bringing outdoors fire as a continuous chain or in a container, as well as ember and fire-related metallic objects
- Weather rituals
  - Rituals to turn away hailstorms (ndalja/larghimi i stuhisë së breshrit)
    - through the protection of fire
  - Rainmaking rituals (thirrja e shiut)
    - Through ritual processions, dances and songs
- Sky cult rituals: Qielli
- Earth cult rituals: Dheu
- Sun cult rituals: Dielli
- Moon cult rituals: Hëna

== Traditional festivals ==
=== Spring equinox ===
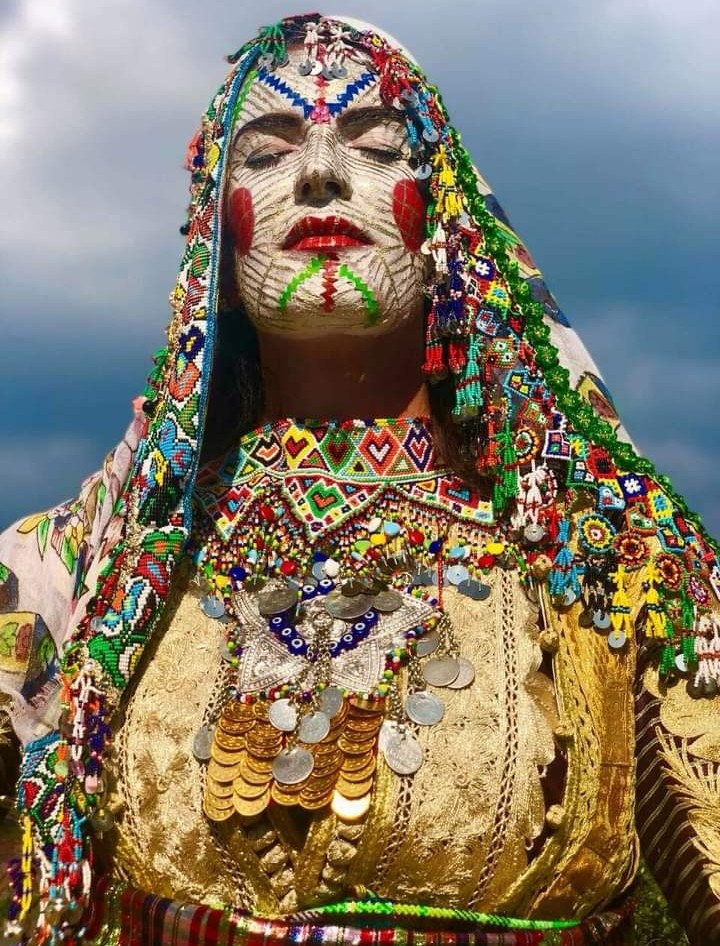
Albanian woman with traditional decorations, during the Illyrian carnivals, celebrating the Albanian spring festival in the Sharr Mountains.

Dita e Verës (Verëza): "The Summer Day", the Albanian spring festival celebrated (also as an official holiday in Albania) on March 1 of the Julian calendar (March 14 of the Gregorian calendar). In the old Albanian calendar it corresponds to the first day of the new year and marks the end of the winter season (the second half of the year) and the beginning of the summer season (the first half of the year) on the spring equinox (Albanian: sadita-nata), marking the period of the year when daylight is longer than night.

Edith Durham – who collected Albanian ethnographic material from northern Albania and Montenegro – reported that Albanian traditional tattooing of girls was practiced on March 19.

Another festival celebrated by Albanians around the spring equinox is Nowruz (Albanian: Dita e Sulltan Nevruzit) celebrated on March 22, mainly by Bektashis, and Dita e Zojës (among the Catholics) or Vangjelizmoi (among the Orthodox), celebrated on March 25.

Those festivities are associated with the cult of the Sun (Dielli) and the renewal of nature. The renewal of nature is also associated with the worship of the Great Mother Goddess (Dheu), which is celebrated with several rites and customs, in particular wood or anything from vegetation cannot be cut, and the earth is considered to be "pregnant" (Alb. me barrë) and cannot be worked.

=== Shëngjergji ===
Shëngjergji "Saint George" (Albanian: Shëngjergji, Kryeviti, Kryet e Motmotit, Motmoti i Ri, Nata e Mojit) is a festival celebrated by Albanians both on April 23 and on May 6 (as well as in the period between). It is also known as It would coincide with Saint George's Day, were it not for the fact that Shëngjergji is celebrated by all Albanians, regardless of being Christians or Muslims, and that the celebrations are carried out with traditional pagan rituals and practices, such as pilgrimages on sacred mountains and places, ritual bonfires on high places, animal sacrifices, water rituals, rituals with serpents, etc. It is rather considered a pre-Christian festivity associated with the worship of a deity of agriculture and livestock.

=== Summer solstice ===
The summer solstice is celebrated by Albanians often with the name Shën Gjini–Shën Gjoni, but also with the names Flakadajt, Festa e Malit or Festa e Bjeshkës ("Mountain Feast"), Festa e Blegtorisë ("Livestock Feast"), and Festa e të Korrave. It is associated with the production in agricultural and livestock activities.

To celebrate this feast, bonfires are traditionally lit where straw is burned and ashes are thrown on the ground, as a "burning for regeneration" ritual. Tribal or community fires are traditionally made with straw, with people jumping across them. In some regions plumes of burning chaff were carried in the air, running through the fields and hills. The ashes of the straw that burned in the ritual fires of this event are traditionally thrown to the field for good luck.

During this feast sheep shearing is traditionally performed by shepherds.

=== Winter solstice ===
Albanian traditional festivities around the winter solstice celebrate the return of the Sun (Dielli) for summer and the lengthening of the days.

The Albanian traditional rites during the winter solstice period are pagan, and very ancient. Albanologist Johann Georg von Hahn (1811 – 1869) reported that clergy, during his time and before, have vigorously fought the pagan rites that were practiced by Albanians to celebrate this festivity, but without success.

The old rites of this festivity were accompanied by collective fires based on the house, kinship or neighborhood, a practice performed in order to give strength to the Sun according to the old beliefs. The rites related to the cult of vegetation, which expressed the desire for increased production in agriculture and animal husbandry, were accompanied by animal sacrifices to the fire, lighting pine trees at night, luck divination tests with crackling in the fire or with coins in ritual bread, making and consuming ritual foods, performing various magical ritualistic actions in livestock, fields, vineyards and orchards, and so on.

==== Nata e Buzmit ====
Nata e Buzmit, "Yule log's night", is celebrated between December 22 and January 6. Buzmi is a ritualistic piece of wood (or several pieces of wood) that is put to burn in the fire (zjarri) of the hearth (vatër) on the night of a winter celebration that falls after the return of the Sun for summer (after the winter solstice), sometimes on the night of Kërshëndella on December 24 (Christmas Eve), sometimes on the night of kolendra, or sometimes on New Year's Day or on any other occasion around the same period, a tradition that is originally related to the cult of the Sun (Dielli).

A series of rituals of a magical character are performed with the buzmi, which, based on old beliefs, aims at agricultural plant growth and for the prosperity of production in the living thing (production of vegetables, trees, vineyards, etc.). This practice has been traditionally found among all Albanians, also documented among the Arbëreshë in Italy and the Arvanites in Greece until the first half of the 20th century, and it is still preserved in remote Albanian ethnographic regions today. It is considered a custom of Proto-Indo-European origin.

The richest set of rites related to buzmi are found in northern Albania (Mirdita, Pukë, Dukagjin, Malësia e Madhe, Shkodër and Lezhë), as well as in Kosovo, Dibër and so on.

== See also ==
- Albanian epic poetry

== Bibliography ==
- Belgiorno de Stefano, Maria Gabriella (2014). "La coesistenza delle religioni in Albania. Le religioni in Albania prima e dopo la caduta del comunismo". Stato, Chiese e Pluralismo Confessionale (in Italian) (6). ISSN 1971-8543.
- Fischer, Bernd J.; Schmitt, Oliver Jens (2022). A Concise History of Albania. Cambridge University Press. ISBN 9781009254908.
- Bido, Agim (1998). "Pagan Symbols in Albanian "Xhubleta"". The Thracian world at the crossroads of civilisations. Vol. 2. Institutul Român de Tracologie. pp. 701–712.
- Bovan, Vlladimir (1985). "Branisllav Kërstiq, Indeks motiva narodnih pesama balkanskih Slovena SANU, Beograd 1984". Gjurmime Albanologjike: Folklor Dhe Etnologji (in Albanian). 15. Albanological Institute of Prishtina.
- Brahaj, Jaho (2007). Flamuri i Kombit Shqiptar: origjina, lashtësia. Enti Botues "Gjergj Fishta". ISBN 9789994338849.
- Çabej, Eqrem (1966). "Albanische Volkskunde". Südost-Forschungen (25): 33–87.
- Calic, Marie-Janine (2019). The Great Cauldron: A History of Southeastern Europe. Harvard University Press. ISBN 9780674239104.
- Camaj, Martin; Fox, Leonard (January 1984). Albanian Grammar: With Exercises, Chrestomathy and Glossaries. Otto Harrassowitz Verlag. ISBN 978-3-447-02467-9.
- Cook, Arthur Bernard (2010) [1940]. Zeus: Zeus, God of the Dark Sky (earthquakes, clouds, wind, dew, rain, meteorites). Zeus: A Study in Ancient Religion. Vol. 3 (Part 2). Cambridge University Press. ISBN 9781108021234.
- Cook, Arthur Bernard (1964) [1914]. Zeus: Zeus, god of the bright sky. Zeus: A Study in Ancient Religion. Vol. 1. Biblo and Tannen.
- Curtis, Matthew C. (2017). "The phonology of Albanian". In Klein, Jared; Joseph, Brian; Fritz, Matthias (eds.). Handbook of Comparative and Historical Indo-European Linguistics. Vol. 3. Walter de Gruyter. ISBN 978-3110540369.
- Daum, Werner (1998). Albanien zwischen Kreuz und Halbmond. Staatliches Museum für Völkerkunde. ISBN 9783701624614.
- De Rapper, Gilles (2012). "Blood and Seed, Trunk and Hearth: Kinship and Common Origin in southern Albania". In Hemming, Andreas; Kera, Gentiana; Pandelejmoni, Enriketa (eds.). Albania: Family, Society and Culture in the 20th century. LIT Verlag Münster. pp. 79–95. ISBN 9783643501448.
- Dedvukaj, Lindon (2023). "Linguistic evidence for the Indo-European and Albanian origin of Aphrodite". Proceedings of the Linguistic Society of America. 8 (1). Linguistic Society of America: 5500. doi:10.3765/plsa.v8i1.5500. S2CID 258381736.
- Demiraj, Bardhyl (1997). Albanische Etymologien: Untersuchungen zum albanischen Erbwortschatz. Leiden Studies in Indo-European (in German). Vol. 7. Amsterdam, Atlanta: Rodopi.
- Demiraj, Bardhyl (2002). "Einheitlichkeit und Spaltung im Laufe des Christianisierungsprozesses der Albaner. Eine ethno-linguistische Fallstudie" (PDF). Studime (in German). Academy of Albanological Studies: 23–41.
- Demiraj, Bardhyl (2011). "Rrënjë dhe degë të krishterimit ndër shqiptarë" (PDF). Hylli i Dritës (in Albanian). 2. Shkodër: 58–78.
- Demiraj, Bardhyl; Starostin, Sergei; Lubotsky, Alexander; de Vaan, Michiel. "The Albanian inherited lexicon" (Database).
- Dobruna-Salihu, Exhlale (2005). "Cult symbols and images on funerary monuments of the Roman Period in the central section in Dardania". In M. Sanadaer, A. Rendić-Miočević (ed.). Religija i mit kao poticaj rimskoj provincijalnoj plastici. Akti VIII. međunarodnog kolokvija o problemima rimskog provincijalnog umjetničkog stvaralaštva / Religion and myth as an impetus for the Roman provincial sculpture. The Proceedings of the 8th International Colloquium on Problems of Roman Provincial Art. Golden marketing-Tehniéka knjiga. Odsjek za arheologiju Filozofskog fakulteta u Zagrebu. pp. 343–350. ISBN 953-212-242-7.
- Doja, Albert (2000). Naître et Grandir chez les Albanais: La Construction Culturelle de la Personne (pdf) (in French). L'Harmattan. ISBN 273848879X.
- Doja, Albert (2005). "Mythology and Destiny" (PDF). Anthropos. 100 (2): 449–462. doi:10.5771/0257-9774-2005-2-449. JSTOR 40466549. S2CID 115147696.
- Doli, Flamur (2009). "Decoration from the house snake cult belief system, as evidenced in Kosovan vernacular architecture". Thesis Kosova (1): 127–144.
- Dunwich, Gerina (2000). Wicca Love Spells. Kensington Publishing Corporation. ISBN 0-8065-1782-4.
- Durham, Edith (1928a). High Albania. LO Beacon Press. ISBN 978-0-8070-7035-2.
- Durham, Edith (1928b). Some tribal origins, laws and customs of the Balkans. London: Allen & Unwin.
- Dushi, Arbnora (2020). "The Sister-Brother Recognition Motif in the Albanian Folk Ballad: Meaning and Contexts within the National Culture". Tautosakos Darbai. 59: 17–29. doi:10.51554/TD.2020.28363. S2CID 253540847.
- Egro, Dritan (2003). Islam in Albanian Lands During the First Two Centuries of the Ottoman Rule. Department of History of Bilkent University.
- Elsie, Robert (1994). Albanian Folktales and Legends. Naim Frashëri Publishing Company. Archived from the original (pdf) on 2009-07-28.
- Elsie, Robert (2001a). A Dictionary of Albanian Religion, Mythology and Folk Culture. London: Hurst & Company. ISBN 1-85065-570-7.
- Elsie, Robert (2001b). Albanian Folktales and Legends. Dukagjini Publishing House.
- Elsie, Robert (2003). Early Albania: A reader of Historical texts, 11th–17th centuries. Wiesbaden: Otto Harrassowitz Verlag. ISBN 9783447047838.
- Elsie, Robert; Mathie-Heck, Janice (January 2004). Songs of the Frontier Warriors. Bolchazy-Carducci Publishers. ISBN 978-0-86516-412-3.
- Elsie, Robert (2007). "The Rediscovery of folk literature in Albania" (PDF). In Marcel Cornis-Pope; John Neubauer (eds.). History of the literary cultures of East-Central Europe: junctures and disjunctures in the 19th and 20th centuries. Vol. III. Amsterdam & Philadelphia: John Benjamins. pp. 335–338. ISBN 978-90-272-3455-1.
- Elsie, Robert (2010). Historical Dictionary of Albania (PDF). Historical Dictionaries of Europe. Vol. 75 (2 ed.). Scarecrow Press. p. 255. ISBN 978-0810861886. Archived from the original (PDF) on 6 October 2014.
- Elsie, Robert (2019). The Albanian Bektashi: History and Culture of a Dervish Order in the Balkans. Bloomsbury Publishing. ISBN 9781788315715.
- Esposito, John L. (2004). The Islamic World: Abbasid caliphate-Historians. Vol. 1. Oxford University Press. ISBN 9780195175929.
- Fakaj, Përparim (2022). "Diversity of Popular Expressions in Albanian Dialect Dictionaries". Buletini Shkencor Reald. 7 (2): 24–41. doi:10.59858/BSHR10012 (inactive 12 July 2025). ISSN 2411-5592.
- Feizi, Abidin (1929). Grammatica della lingua albanese. Pubblicazione del R. Istituto orientale di Napoli. Napoli: Achille Cimmaruta.
- Fishta, Gjergj; Lambertz, Maximilian (1958). "Die Laute des Hochlandes (Lahuta e malcis)". Südosteuropäische Arbeiten. 51. R. Oldenbourg. ISSN 0933-6850.
- Frashëri, Naim (1980). Dhimitër S. Shuteriqi (ed.). Vepra të zgjedhura. Vol. 1. Akademia e Shkencave e RPSSH.
- Galaty, Michael; Lafe, Ols; Lee, Wayne; Tafilica, Zamir (2013). Light and Shadow: Isolation and Interaction in the Shala Valley of Northern Albania. The Cotsen Institute of Archaeology Press. ISBN 978-1931745710.
- Galaty, Michael L. (2018). Memory and Nation Building: From Ancient Times to the Islamic State. Rowman & Littlefield. ISBN 9780759122628.
- Gjoni, Irena (2012). Marrëdhënie të miteve dhe kulteve të bregdetit të Jonit me areale të tjera mitike (PhD) (in Albanian). Tirana: University of Tirana, Faculty of History and Philology.
- Golan, Ariel (1991). Myth and Symbol: Symbolism in Prehistoric Religions. A. Golan. ISBN 9789652222459.
- Golan, Ariel (2003). Prehistoric Religion: Mythology, Symbolism. A. Golan. ISBN 9789659055500.
- Halimi, Zanita; Halimi-Statovci, Drita; Xhemaj, Ukë (2011). Rite dhe Aktualiteti [Rites and Contemporariness/Present Time] (PDF). Translated by Lumnije Kadriu. University of Prishtina.
- Huld, Martin E. (1976). "Albanian yll 'star'". Zeitschrift für vergleichende Sprachforschung. 90 (1/2). Vandenhoeck & Ruprecht (GmbH & Co. KG): 178–182. JSTOR 40848500.
- Hykolli, Atdhe; Krasniqi, Seniha (2020). "The Phenomenon of Calendar Lyrical Poetry and Its Genesis". Journal of Awareness. 5 (2): 77–84. doi:10.26809/joa.5.007 (inactive 11 July 2025). eISSN 2149-6544.
- Hyllested, Adam; Joseph, Brian D. (2022). "Albanian". In Olander, Thomas (ed.). The Indo-European Language Family : A Phylogenetic Perspective. Cambridge University Press. pp. 223–245. doi:10.1017/9781108758666. ISBN 9781108758666. S2CID 161016819. Archived from the original on 2025-11-26.
- Hyllested, Adam (2024). "The Indo-European origins of Persephone and the Albanian goddess Premtë". Book of Abstracts – The Speakers of Indo-European and Their World: 17th Fachtagung of the Society for Indo-European Studies 9–12 September 2024, Basel University (Switzerland) (PDF). University of Basel. pp. 59–61.
- Hysi, Shyqyri (2006). "Kulte tradicionale shqiptare" [Albanian Traditional Cults]. Gjurmime Albanologjike - Folklor Dhe Etnologji (in Albanian) (36). Instituti Albanologjik i Prishtinës: 349–361.
- Joseph, Brian D.; Dedvukaj, Lindon (2024). "Turning night into day: Milieu and semantic change in Albanian". Proceedings of the Linguistic Society of America. 9 (1). Linguistic Society of America: 5681. doi:10.3765/plsa.v9i1.5681.
- Juka, S. S. (1984), Kosova: The Albanians in Yugoslavia in Light of Historical Documents: An Essay, Waldon Press, ISBN 9780961360108
- Koch, Harold (2015). "Patterns in the diffusion of nomenclature systems: Australian subsections in comparison to European days of the week". In Dag T.T. Haug (ed.). Historical Linguistics 2013: Selected papers from the 21st International Conference on Historical Linguistics, Oslo, 5-9 August 2013. Current Issues in Linguistic Theory. Vol. 334. With the assistance of: Eiríkur Kristjánsson. John Benjamins Publishing Company. ISBN 978-90-272-6818-1.
- Kölligan, Daniel (2017). "The lexicon of Proto-Indo-European". In Klein, Jared; Joseph, Brian; Fritz, Matthias (eds.). Handbook of Comparative and Historical Indo-European Linguistics. Vol. 3. Walter de Gruyter. ISBN 978-3110540369.
- Kondi, Bledar (2017). "Un regard critique sur l'ethnographie de la mort en Albanie". Ethnologie française. 166 (2): 277–288. doi:10.3917/ethn.172.0277.
- Kostallari, Androkli (1981). Fjalor i gjuhës së sotme shqipe (in Albanian). Vol. 1. Tiranë: Rilindja.
- Krasniqi, Nysret (2019). "Topofilia letrare" (PDF). STUDIME, Revistë për studime filologjike (in Albanian). 26. Kosova Academy of Sciences and Arts: 129–138.
- Krasniqi, Shensi (2014). "Pilgrimages in mountains in Kosovo". Revista Santuários, Cultura, Arte, Romarias, Peregrinações, Paisagens e Pessoas. ISSN 2183-3184.
- Kressing, Frank; Kaser, Karl (2002). Albania--a country in transition: aspects of changing identities in a South-East European country. Nomos. ISBN 3789076708.
- Lajçi, Bashkim (2019). "Kulti i flijimit te shqiptarët" [The Cult of Sacrifice Among Albanians]. Gjurmime Albanologjike - Folklor Dhe Etnologji (49): 29–39.
- Lambertz, Maximilian (1922). Albanische Märchen (und andere Texte zur albanischen Volkskunde). Wien: A. Hölder.
- Lambertz, Maximilian (1949). Gjergj Fishta und das albanische Heldenepos Lahuta e Malcís, Laute des Hochlandes: eine Einführung in die albanische Sagenwelt. O. Harrassowitz.
- Lambertz, Maximilian (1952). Die geflügelte Schwester und die Dunklen der Erde: Albanische Volksmärchen. Das Gesicht der Völker (in German). Vol. 9. Im Erich.
- Lambertz, Maximilian (1973). "Die Mythologie der Albaner". In Hans Wilhelm Haussig (ed.). Wörterbuch der Mythologie (in German). Vol. 2.
- Leka, Arian (2018). "Motive shtegtare, elemente mitike dhe krijesa imagjinare në epikën shqiptare". Albanologjia – International Journal of Albanology (in Albanian) (9–10): 117–120. eISSN 2545-4919. ISSN 1857-9485.
- Lelaj, Olsi (2015). "Mbi tatuazhin në shoqërinë shqiptare" [On Tattoo in the Albanian Society]. Kultura Popullore. 34 (71–72). Centre of Albanological Studies: 91–118. ISSN 2309-5717.
- Lloyd, A. L. (1968). "Albanian Folk Song". Folk Music Journal. 1 (4): 205–222. JSTOR 4521791.
- Loria-Rivel, Gustavo Adolfo (2020). "Dede Korkut and its Parallelisms with Albanian Epic Traditions. Female Warriors in Albanian and Turkic Epics". In Nikol Dziub, Greta Komur-Thilloy (ed.). Penser le multiculturalisme dans les marges de l'Europe. Studies on South East Europe. Vol. 26. LIT Verlag Münster. pp. 45–53. ISBN 9783643912930.
- Lurker, Manfred (2004). The Routledge Dictionary of Gods and Goddesses, Devils and Demons. Routledge, Taylor & Francis. ISBN 0-203-64351-8.
- Lurker, Manfred (2005). The Routledge Dictionary of Gods and Goddesses, Devils and Demons. Routledge, Taylor & Francis. ISBN 0-203-64351-8.
- Malcolm, Noel (2020). Rebels, Believers, Survivors: Studies in the History of the Albanians. Oxford University Press. ISBN 978-0192599223.
- Mallory, James P.; Adams, Douglas Q., eds. (1997), Encyclopedia of Indo-European Culture, London: Routledge, ISBN 978-1-884964-98-5, (EIEC)
- Mallory, James P.; Adams, Douglas Q. (2006), The Oxford Introduction to Proto-Indo-European and the Proto-Indo-European World, Oxford, England: Oxford University Press, ISBN 978-0-19-929668-2
- Mann, Stuart E. (1948). An Historical Albanian-English Dictionary. Vol. II, N–Z. Longmans, Green and Co., LTD.
- Mann, Stuart E. (1952). "The Indo-European Consonants in Albanian". Language. 28 (1). Linguistic Society of America: 31–40. doi:10.2307/409988. JSTOR 409988.
- Mann, Stuart E (1977). An Albanian Historical Grammar. Hamburg: Helmut Buske Verlag. ISBN 9783871182624.
- Matzinger, Joachim (2018). "The Lexicon of Albanian". In Klein, Jared; Joseph, Brian; Fritz, Matthias (eds.). Handbook of Comparative and Historical Indo-European Linguistics. Vol. 3. Walter de Gruyter. ISBN 978-3-11-054243-1.
- Miftari, Vehbi; Visoka, Avdi (2019). "The Hero of Great Deeds: From Albanian Songs of the Frontier Warriors to French Chansons de Geste". Journal of History Culture and Art Research. 8 (1): 237–242. doi:10.7596/taksad.v8i1.1761 (inactive 11 July 2025).
- Ministria e Mjedisit dhe Planifikimit Hapësinor (2014). Parku Kombëtar "Sharri" – Plani Hapësinor. Kosovo Environmental Protection Agency, Institute for Spatial Planning.
- Minkov, Anton (2004). Conversion to Islam in the Balkans: Kisve Bahas ̧petitions and Ottoman Social Life, 1670-1730. Brill. ISBN 9004135766.
- Muka, Ali (1984). "Vendi i zjarrit në banesën fshatare të shqipërisë së mesme" [Fireplace in the Peasant Dwelling of Central Albania]. Kultura Popullore (4). Qendra e Studimeve Albanologjike: 29–54.
- Murray-Aynsley, J. C. (1891). "Swastika". Ars Quatuor Coronatorum. IV.
- Neri, Sergio (2021). "hënë". Wörterbuch – DPEWA. DPEWA - Digitales Philologisch-Etymologisches Wörterbuch des Altalbanischen.
- Neziri, Zeqirja (2015). Lirika gojore shqiptare (in Albanian). Skopje: Interlingua. ISBN 978-9989-173-52-3.
- Neziri, Zymer U. (2001). Xhevat Syla (ed.). Këngë të kreshnikëve. Libri Shkollor.
- Neziri, Zymer U. (2008). Institute of Albanology of Prishtina (ed.). Studime për folklorin: Epika gojore dhe etnokultura [The Study of Folklore: The Oral Epic and Ethnoculture]. Vol. II. Grafobeni.
- Neziri, Zymer U. (2021). "The Albanian Collection of Albert B. Lord in Northern Albania: Context, Contents, and Singers". In Scaldaferri, Nicola (ed.). Wild Songs, Sweet Songs: The Albanian Epic in the Collections of Milman Parry and Albert B. Lord. Publications of the Milman Parry Collection of Oral Literature Series. Vol. 5. In collaboration with Victor Friedman, John Kolsti, Zymer U. Neziri. Harvard University, Center for Hellenic Studies. ISBN 9780674271333.
- Norris, Harry Thirlwall (1993). Islam in the Balkans: Religion and Society Between Europe and the Arab World. Columbia, S.C: University of South Carolina Press. p. 211. ISBN 9780872499775. OCLC 28067651.
- Novik, Alexander (2015). "Lexicon of Albanian Mythology: Areal Studies in the Polylingual Region of Azov Sea". Slavia Meridionalis. 15: 261–273. doi:10.11649/sm.2015.022.
- Orel, Vladimir (1998). Albanian etymological dictionary. Brill. ISBN 978-90-04-11024-3.
- Pipa, Arshi (1978). Albanian Folk Verse: Structure and Genre. O. Harrassowitz. ISBN 3878281196.
- Pipa, Arshi (1993). "Mythology of Albania". In Bonnefoy, Yves (ed.). American, African, and Old European mythologies. University of Chicago Press. ISBN 0-226-06457-3.
- Plangarica, Tomor (2001). Christiane Montécot; Vladimir Osipov; Sophie Vassilaki (eds.). "Les noms propres en albanais et quelques-unes de leurs particularités à l'époque actuelle". Cahiers balkaniques. 32. Publications Langues'O: 39–54. ISBN 9782858311286. ISSN 0290-7402.
- Poghirc, Cicerone (1987). "Albanian Religion". In Mircea Eliade (ed.). The Encyclopedia of Religion. Vol. 1. New York: MacMillan Publishing Co. pp. 178–180.
- Qafleshi, Muharrem (2011). Opoja dhe Gora ndër shekuj [Opoja and Gora During Centuries]. Albanological Institute of Pristina. ISBN 978-9951-596-51-0.
- Ramet, Sabrina P. (1989). Religion and Nationalism in Soviet and East European Politics. Duke University Press. p. 381. ISBN 0-8223-0891-6.
- Sako, Zihni; et al. (Komisjoni i folklorit) (1954). Pralla popullore shqiptare (in Albanian). N.SH.B. Stabilimenti "Mihal Duri", Tiranë: Instituti i Shkencave.
- Sarao, K. T. S. (2021). Baku's Temple of Eternal Fire: Its Connections to Baba Nanak and the Udasi Sadhus. Bloomsbury. ISBN 9789354350986.
- Sardushkin, Valery M. (2002). "Is "God" in Albanian Feminine or Masculine?". The Bible Translator. 53 (1). SAGE Publications: 137–143. doi:10.1177/026009350205300104. eISSN 2051-6789. ISSN 2051-6770. S2CID 151466803.
- Schirò, Giuseppe (1923). Canti tradizionali ed altri saggi delle colonie albanesi di Sicilia. Stab. tip. L. Pierro.
- Schirò, Giuseppe (1959). Storia della letteratura albanese. Storia delle letterature di tutto il mondo (in Italian). Vol. 41. Nuova accademia.
- Sedaj, Engjëll (1982). "Ngjashmëri të hyjnive homerike dhe atyre shqiptare". Gjurmime Albanologjike. Albanological Institute of Prishtina: 71–90.
- Shetuni, Spiro J. (2011). Albanian Traditional Music: An Introduction, with Sheet Music and Lyrics for 48 Songs. McFarland. ISBN 978-0-7864-8630-4.
- Shah, Idries (2017) [1979]. World tales : the extraordinary coincidence of stories told in all times, in all places. London: ISF Publishing. pp. 229–232, 254–256. ISBN 978-1-78479-120-9.
- Shuteriqi, Dhimitër S. (1959). Historia e letërsisë shqipe. Vol. 1. Universiteti Shtetëror i Tiranës, Instituti i Historisë dhe Gjuhësisë.
- Sinani, Shaban (2010). "Rikodifikimi i shenjës në romanin "Dranja". Një vështrim Antropologjik". In Bardhyl Demiraj (ed.). Wir sind die Deinen: Studien zur albanischen Sprache, Literatur und Kulturgeschichte, dem Gedenken an Martin Camaj (1925–1992) gewidmet. Otto Harrassowitz Verlag. pp. 101–112. ISBN 9783447062213.
- Skendi, Stavro (1954). Albanian and South Slavic Oral Epic Poetry. Philadelphia: American Folklore Society. ISBN 9780527010966. OCLC 3794368.
- Skendi, Stavro (1967). "Crypto-Christianity in the Balkan Area under the Ottomans". Slavic Review. 26 (2): 227–246. doi:10.2307/2492452. JSTOR 2492452. S2CID 163987636.
- Skendi, Stavro (1967b). The Albanian national awakening. Princeton: Princeton University Press. ISBN 9781400847761.
- Søborg, Tobias Mosbæk (2020). Sigmatic Verbal Formations in Anatolian and Indo-European: A Cladistic Study (Thesis). University of Copenhagen, Department of Nordic Studies and Linguistics.
- Sokoli, Ramadan (2000). Gojëdhana e përrallëza të botës shqiptare. Toena. ISBN 9789992713198.
- Sokoli, Ramadan (2013) [1999]. "The Albanian World in the Folk Teller's Stories". In Margaret Read MacDonald (ed.). Traditional Storytelling Today: An International Sourcebook. Translated by Pranvera Xhelo. Routledge. ISBN 9781135917142.
- Stadtmüller, Georg (1954). "Altheidnischer Volksglaube und Christianisierung in Albanien". Orientalia Christiana Periodica (in German). XX. Pontificium Institutum Orientalium Studiorum: 211–246.
- Steiner-Karafili, Enit (2010). "Byron and the Albanians: Unearthing Identities". Studia Albanica (2): 137–147. ISSN 0585-5047.
- Stipčević, Aleksandar (1977). The Illyrians: history and culture. Noyes Press. ISBN 978-0815550525.
- Stipčević, Aleksandar (1989). Iliri: povijest, život, kultura (in Croatian). Školska knjiga. ISBN 9788603991062.
- Stipčević, Aleksandar (2009). "Elementët parahistorike në besimet e arbëreshëve të Zarës". AKTET (in Albanian): 505–509. ISSN 2073-2244.
- Tagliavini, Carlo (1963). Storia di parole pagane e cristiane attraverso i tempi (in Italian). Morcelliana.
- Tarifa, Fatos (2008). "Of Time, Honor, and Memory: Oral Law in Albania" (PDF). Oral Tradition. 23 (1): 3–14. doi:10.1353/ort.0.0017.
- Thomaj, Jan (2002). Fjalor i shqipes së sotme: me rreth 34.000 fjalë (in Albanian). Botimet Toena. ISBN 9789992716076.
- Tirta, Mark (2004). Petrit Bezhani (ed.). Mitologjia ndër shqiptarë (in Albanian). Tirana: Mësonjëtorja. ISBN 99927-938-9-9.
- Treimer, Karl (1971). "Zur Rückerschliessung der illyrischen Götterwelt und ihre Bedeutung für die südslawische Philologie". In Henrik Barić (ed.). Arhiv za Arbanasku starinu, jezik i etnologiju. Vol. I. R. Trofenik. pp. 27–33.
- Trnavci, Genc (2010). "The Interaction of Customary Law with the Modern Rule of Law in Albania and Kosova". In Sellers, Mortimer; Tomaszewski, Tadeusz (eds.). The Rule of Law in Comparative Perspective. Ius Gentium: Comparative Perspectives on Law and Justice. Vol. 3. Springer Verlag. pp. 201–215. ISBN 978-90-481-3748-0.
- Useini, Rini (2024). "Ethnology as a Vital Manifestation, (Folk Rites and Practices)". Philosophica. 11 (22–23). University of Tetova: 160–166. doi:10.62792/ut.philosophica.v11.i22-23.p2732. ISSN 2671-3020.
- Ushaku, Ruzhdi (1988). "Mbi strukturën leksiko-semantike dhe etimologjike të tipit të togfjalëshit të shqipes burri i dheut (Mundësia për një rindërtim)". Gjurmime Albanologjike. 17–18. Albanological Institute of Prishtina: 63–76.
- Vata-Mikeli, Rovena (2023). "Shtresa mitologjike në kënget epike legjendare shqiptare, rasti i Eposit të Kreshnikëve". ALBANOLOGJIA International Journal of Albanology. 10 (19–20). University of Tetova: 428–431. eISSN 2545-4919. ISSN 1857-9485.
- Watkins, Calvert (1995). How to Kill a Dragon: Aspects of Indo-European Poetics. London: Oxford University Press. ISBN 978-0-19-514413-0.
- West, Morris L. (2007). Indo-European Poetry and Myth. Oxford University Press. ISBN 978-0199280759.
- Wheeler, G. Post (1936). Albanian Wonder Tales. New York: The Junior Literary Guild and Doubleday, Doran and Company, Inc. pp. 247–280.
- Wilkes, J. J. (1995), The Illyrians, Oxford, United Kingdom: Blackwell Publishing, ISBN 0-631-19807-5
- Wolff, Martine (2022). "Transhumance in Kelmend, Northern Albania: Traditions, Contemporary Challenges, and Sustainable Development". In Bindi, Letizia (ed.). Grazing Communities: Pastoralism on the Move and Biocultural Heritage Frictions. Environmental Anthropology and Ethnobiology. Vol. 29. Berghahn Books. pp. 102–120. ISBN 9781800734760.
- Xhemaj, Ukë (1983). "Zjarri në besimet popullore shqiptare" [The Fire in Albanian Folk Beliefs]. In Mark Krasniqi, Ukë Xhemaj (ed.). Trashëgimia dhe tranformimi i kulturës popullore: materiala nga sesioni shkencor, mbajtur në Prishtinë më 7-8 shtator 1979. Albanological Institute of Prishtina. pp. 104–121.
- Yamamoto, Kazuhiko (2005). The ethical structure of Kanun and its cultural implications. Melosi Design. ISBN 9780972992398.
- York, Michael (1993). "Toward a Proto-Indo-European vocabulary of the sacred". WORD. 44 (2): 235–254. doi:10.1080/00437956.1993.11435902. ISSN 0043-7956.
