= Vatër =

Domestic hearth in Albanian culture

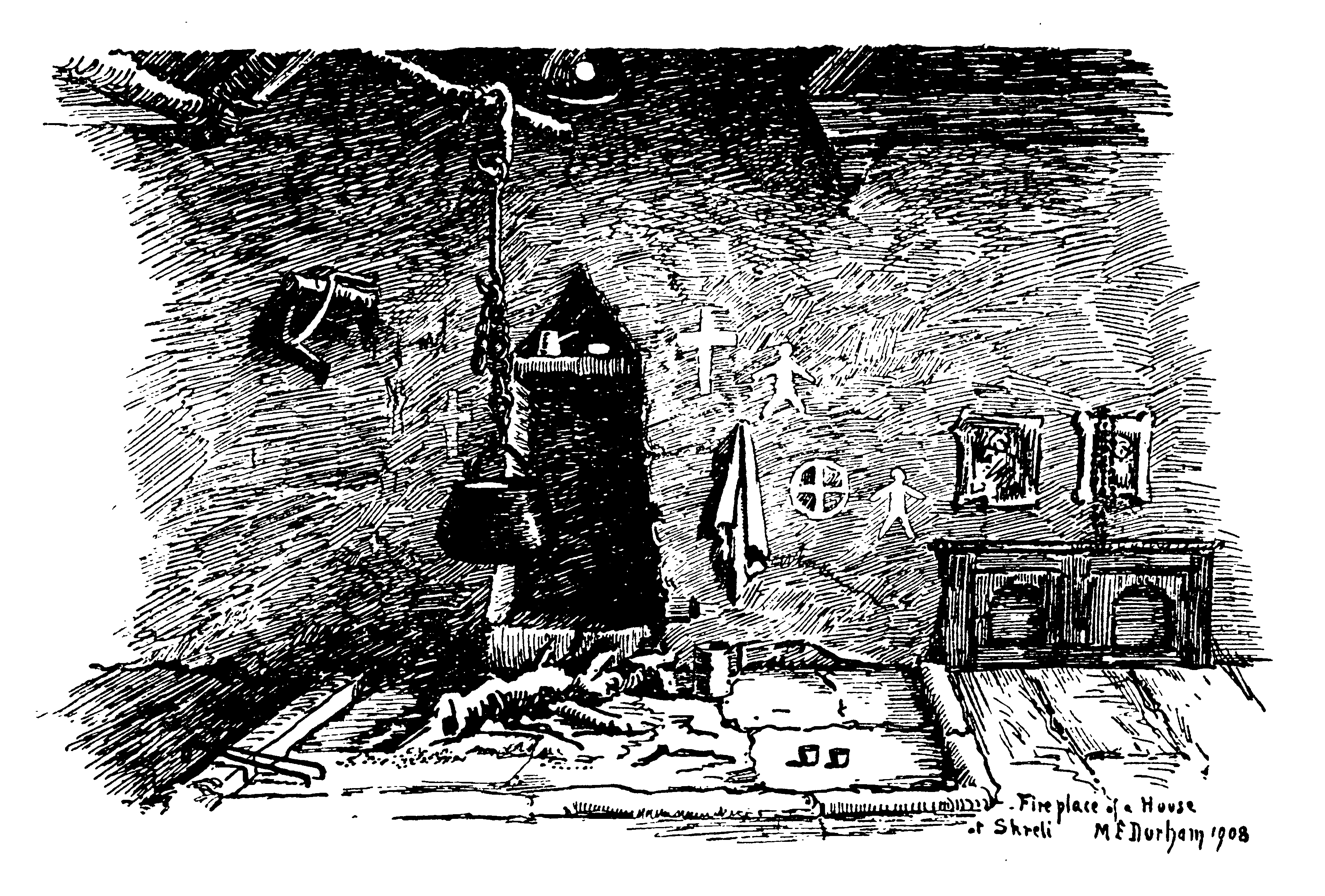
Fireplace (votër) of a house of Shkreli, northern Albania, drawn by Edith Durham in 1909.

The vatër (or votër; Albanian definite form: vatra or votra) is the domestic hearth in Albanian culture. The fire of the domestic hearth (Zjarri i Vatrës) holds divine attributes in Albanian beliefs, being considered the sustainer of the continuity between the world of the living and that of the dead, and ensuring the continuity of the tribe (fis) from generation to generation. The absence of fire in a house is traditionally considered a great curse. In Albanian folk beliefs the fire hearth is the symbol of fire as the offspring of the Sun (Dielli). In Albanian tradition the deified fire (zjarri) was evidently also called with the theonym Enji, the god to whom Thursday – e enjte – was dedicated in the Albanian language.

== Etymology ==
The Albanian term vatër (or votër; Albanian definite form: vatra or votra), "hearth", "fireplace", is derived from Proto-Albanian *ōtr-, obtained through the *o to *vo-/*va- development which is observed exclusively in the Albanian language as the diphthongization of *o in the two major dialect groups (Tosk: vatra/Gheg: votra). It is an Albanian inherited term from Proto-Indo-European *h₂ehₓ-tr-eh₂ < *h₂eh₁ter- ("fire"). It is a cognate to Latin ater and Proto-Iranian *HáHtr̥š ("fire", cf. Avestan: Atar). The Albanian term, in particular the Tosk form with va-, was loaned to Romanian and spread to other Balkan languages such as Slavic.

The Albanian term zjarr, zjarm, zjerm, etc., "fire", is inherited from Proto-Indo-European *gʷʰermno- "warm". Notably within the Palaeo-Balkanic IE group, it is cognate to Greek: θερμός thermos and Armenian: ǰerm.

== Tradition ==
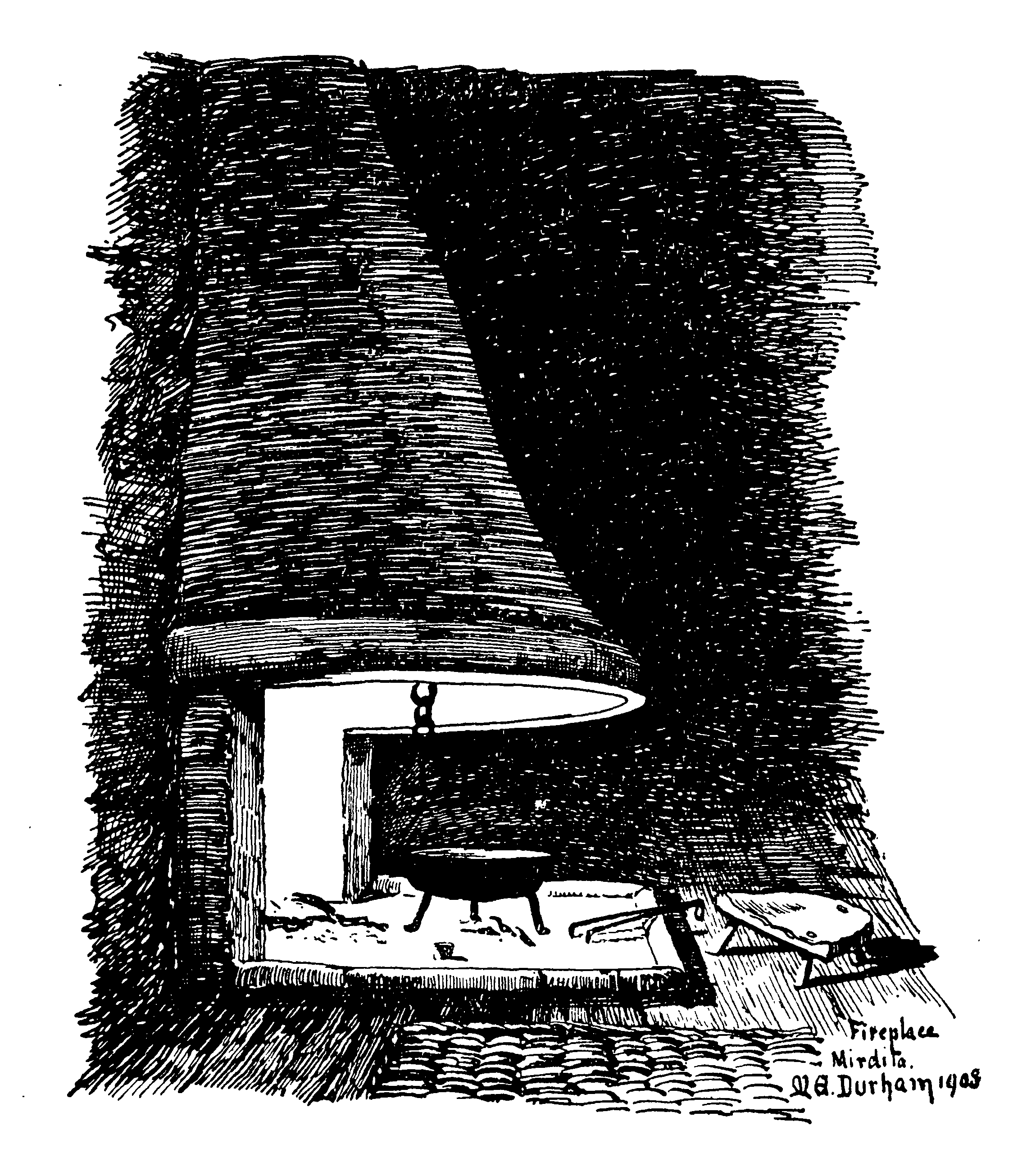
Hearth fire lighting a dark room in a house of Mirdita, northern Albania. Drawn by Edith Durham in 1909.

The function of the fire of the domestic hearth (Zjarri i Vatrës) is the sustenance of the continuity between the world of the living and that of the dead. After death, the souls of the ancestors (hije) assume a divine connotation and remain in contact with the family protecting the domestic hearth.

Zjarri i vatrës is considered to ensure the continuity of the tribe (fis) from generation to generation. In Albanian tradition, indeed, the lineage is identified with an original fire (zjarr); the members of a tribe are the ones who come "from the same fire" (pe një zjarri). The fire burns into the hearth (vatër), where it assumes another connotation besides the primordial concept: the fire of the domestic hearth is considered also as a place of common existence and commensality.

In Albanian folk beliefs the fire hearth (vatra e zjarrit) is the symbol of fire as the offspring of Dielli ("the Sun"). The place of the ignition of fire is traditionally built in the center of the house and of circular shape representing the Sun. Traditionally the fire of the hearth is identified with the existence of the family and it is worshiped as a deity (hyjni/perëndi të zjarrit të vatrës). Its extinguishing is regarded as a bad omen for the family.

Some of the information Catholic priest Ernesto Cozzi had given Edith Durham about Albanian folk beliefs and customs of the very early 19th century was recorded by her, also in particular about the fire cult in northern Albania:

He says that great ceremony is observed when the fire is for the first time kindled in the hearth of a newly built house. The Zoti i Shpis [master of the house] must enter alone, stark naked, while the rest of the family wait outside. The fire has already been laid on the hearth & into this the Zoti i Shpis fires his revolver thus lighting it. He then goes out & dresses & all enter & take possession of the house.

Rose Wilder Lane (1923) provided the following description regarding the northern Albanian fire cult:

The bride carries with her from her home one invariable gift—a pair of fire tongs. When she arrives at her husband's house she takes a humble place in the corner, standing, her hands folded on her breast, her eyes downcast, and for three days and nights she is required to remain in that position... this custom remains from the old days when the father of each house was also the priestly guardian of the fire, and anyone coming to ask for a light from it stood reverently in that position, silent, before the hearth, until the father priest gave it to him. The bride, newcomer in the family, is a suppliant for the gift of fire, of life, of the mystery that continues the race.

A figure which is widespread in Albanian beliefs is Gjarpri i vatrës (the serpent of the hearth), a household divine serpent personifying the souls of the ancestors. Another widespread figure is Nëna e Vatrës (the Mother of the Hearth), a beneficent deity who protects the fire of the domestic hearth. She is akin to Greek Hestia and Roman Vesta. To the Greek and Roman goddesses well-defined public places of worship were dedicated, while in the Albanian tradition the place of worship of Nëna e Vatrës is the hearth of every house. In this aspect the Albanian cult is more similar to the ancient cult of the natural eternal fire of Nymphaion.

Sacrificial offerings to the deities associated with the hearth are traditionally practiced by Albanians at feasts, by throwing some of the food they prepared into the fire of the domestic hearth and around the hearth.

== See also ==
- Atar
- Nëna e Vatrës
- Nymphaion (fire sanctuary)
- Hestia
- Vesta (mythology)
- Enji (deity)
- I Verbti
- Fatia
- Ora (mythology)
- Vitore

== Sources ==
=== Bibliography ===
- Curtis, Matthew C. (2018). "99. The dialectology of Albanian". In Fritz, Matthias; Joseph, Brian; Klein, Jared (eds.). Handbook of Comparative and Historical Indo-European Linguistics. de Gruyter Mouton. ISBN 978-3-11-054036-9.
- De Rapper, Gilles (2012). "Blood and Seed, Trunk and Hearth: Kinship and Common Origin in southern Albania". In Hemming, Andreas; Kera, Gentiana; Pandelejmoni, Enriketa (eds.). Albania: Family, Society and Culture in the 20th century. LIT Verlag Münster. pp. 79–95. ISBN 9783643501448.
- Galaty, Michael; Lafe, Ols; Lee, Wayne; Tafilica, Zamir (2013). Light and Shadow: Isolation and Interaction in the Shala Valley of Northern Albania. The Cotsen Institute of Archaeology Press. ISBN 978-1931745710.
- Gjoni, Irena (2012). Marrëdhënie të miteve dhe kulteve të bregdetit të Jonit me areale të tjera mitike (PhD) (in Albanian). Tirana: University of Tirana, Faculty of History and Philology.
- Hyllested, Adam; Joseph, Brian D. (2022). "Albanian". In Olander, Thomas (ed.). The Indo-European Language Family : A Phylogenetic Perspective. Cambridge University Press. pp. 223–245. doi:10.1017/9781108758666. ISBN 9781108758666. S2CID 161016819.
- Koch, Harold (2015). "Patterns in the diffusion of nomenclature systems: Australian subsections in comparison to European days of the week". In Dag T.T. Haug (ed.). Historical Linguistics 2013: Selected papers from the 21st International Conference on Historical Linguistics, Oslo, 5-9 August 2013. Current Issues in Linguistic Theory. Vol. 334. With the assistance of: Eiríkur Kristjánsson. John Benjamins Publishing Company. ISBN 978-90-272-6818-1.
- Lurker, Manfred (2005). The Routledge Dictionary of Gods and Goddesses, Devils and Demons. Routledge, Taylor & Francis. ISBN 0-203-64351-8.
- Malcolm, Noel (2020). Rebels, Believers, Survivors: Studies in the History of the Albanians. Oxford University Press. ISBN 978-0192599223.
- Mallory, James P.; Adams, Douglas Q., eds. (1997), Encyclopedia of Indo-European Culture, London: Routledge, ISBN 978-1-884964-98-5, (EIEC)
- Monaghan, Patricia (1997). The New Book of Goddesses & Heroines. Llewellyn Publications. p. 324. ISBN 9781567184655.
- Muka, Ali (1984). "Vendi i zjarrit në banesën fshatare të shqipërisë së mesme" [Fireplace in the Peasant Dwelling of Central Albania]. Kultura Popullore (4). Qendra e Studimeve Albanologjike: 29–54.
- Olsen, Birgit Anette; Thorsø, Rasmus (2022). "Armenian". In Olander, Thomas (ed.). The Indo-European Language Family: A Phylogenetic Perspective. Cambridge University Press. pp. 202–222. doi:10.1017/9781108758666.012. ISBN 9781108758666.
- Orel, Vladimir (1998). Albanian etymological dictionary. Brill. ISBN 978-90-04-11024-3.
- Poghirc, Cicerone (1987). "Albanian Religion". In Mircea Eliade (ed.). The Encyclopedia of Religion. Vol. 1. New York: MacMillan Publishing Co. pp. 178–180.
- Sarao, K. T. S. (2021). Baku's Temple of Eternal Fire: Its Connections to Baba Nanak and the Udasi Sadhus. Bloomsbury. ISBN 9789354350986.
- Stipčević, Aleksandar (2009). "Elementët parahistorike në besimet e arbëreshëve të Zarës". AKTET (in Albanian): 505–509. ISSN 2073-2244.
- Tagliavini, Carlo (1963). Storia di parole pagane e cristiane attraverso i tempi. Brescia: Morcelliana.
- Tirta, Mark (2004). Petrit Bezhani (ed.). Mitologjia ndër shqiptarë (in Albanian). Tirana: Mësonjëtorja. ISBN 99927-938-9-9.
- Treimer, Karl (1971). "Zur Rückerschliessung der illyrischen Götterwelt und ihre Bedeutung für die südslawische Philologie". In Henrik Barić (ed.). Arhiv za Arbanasku starinu, jezik i etnologiju. Vol. I. R. Trofenik. pp. 27–33.
- Vermeer, Willem (2008). "The prehistory of the Albanian vowel system: A preliminary exploration". Studies in Slavic and General Linguistics. 32: 591–608. ISSN 0169-0124. JSTOR 40997529.
