= Zana (mythology) =

Albanian mythological figure

Zana (Zanë in Gheg or Zërë in Tosk, pl. zanë(t), see other variants below) is a nymph-like figure in Albanian mythology and folklore, usually associated with mountains, springs and streams, forests, vegetation and animals, human vital energy and sometimes destiny. Zana e Madhe ("the Great Zana") is thought to have been an Illyrian goddess, equivalent of the Ancient Greek Artemis and Roman Diana.

The zana are considered in folk beliefs to be extraordinary courageous (thus the Albanian expression trim si zana) and they confer their protection on warriors similarly to Pallas Athena of Ancient Greece. Innumerable Albanian folk poems, myths and legends that are dedicated to Zana and her friends have been handed down to modern times. The zana are thought to have observed the speeches at the League of Prizren at 1878. Similar Albanian mythological figures with nymph-like attributes are: Ora, Bardha, Shtojzovalle, Mira and Fatí.

== Name ==
=== Variants ===
The name of the mythological figure is an old Albanian word. Therefore, several Albanian dialectal variants exist, such as zânë, zënë, zërë, xanë, xânë, etc. (and their definite forms: zâna, zëna, zëra, xana, xâna, etc.). Arbëreshë Zónja or Zónja të Jáshtëme are also used, the latter is found also in standard Albanian as Jashtësme, a euphemism of Zana.

=== Etymology ===
Since the unvoiced Illyrian fricative th is considered to be analogous with z in Albanian, the Illyrian Thana (the name of a nymph, fairy or deity, attested in votive inscriptions of the Roman era) is traditionally considered the precursor of the Albanian Zana. The theonym is also regarded as a cognate and equivalent of the Latin Diāna. (Note: Râdulescu 1996, p. 348: "The Albanian 'fairy' names cannot be accounted for as direct descendants of Lat. Diana, because Albanian initial z- or x- never originated in Latin initial d-. A loan from Oriental Latin or from Aromanian is also to be ignored: zânë, zënë, zërë, xanë, etc. is an old Albanian word, as proved by its numerous dialectal variants, the n- rhotacism of some of the T forms and the derivative and meaning variants, which are partially different from the Daco-Romanian and the Aromanian ones, due to the particularities of these languages. Yet there can be no doubt as to their common origin.") In this case, along with Romanian zână, Albanian zana may be related to Proto-Indo-European Dyeus ('bright, sky, deity'), all ultimately deriving from *dyeu 'sky', similarly to the Albanian sky and lightning god Zoj-z, and its possible epithet Zot "Sky Father" from Proto-Albanian *dźie̅u ̊ a(t)t-, ultimately from PIE *Dyḗus ph₂tḗr. The Arbëreshë variant of the name for nymph, Zónja (also referred to as Zónja të Jáshtëme), would also be a cognate. Similarly to Zot "God", "Lord", zot "lord", capitalized Zonja or Zôja is used in Albanian for "Goddess", "Lady" (cf. Zonja e Dheut and Zôja Prende or Zôja e Bukuris), while uncapitalized zonja or zôja is used for "lady" or "mistress". Ancient Greek Dióne, parallel to Latin Diāna, could be regarded as a feminine counterpart of the Sky-God. The variant ζόνε Zonë appears in Albanian oaths like περ τένε ζόνε, për tënë Zonë, "By our God/Lord", and in Old Albanian texts for Pater Noster (Tënëzonë, tënë-Zonë). It is equivalent to the Albanian accusative Zótënë/Zótnë, obtained through the assimilation of -tënë/-tnë into -në. At the sanctuary of Dodona the Greek Sky-God Zeus is paired with Dione, and the geographical coincidence of the Albanian case is remarkable.

Other less common etymologies have been proposed: from Albanian: zë/-ri, zâ/-ni, meaning 'voice' (pl. zëra/zana meaning 'voices'), with the sense of 'muse', also interpreted as a goddess of singing; from Albanian: zë(n), xë(n), zâ(n), meaning 'to take (hold of), seize, clutch, catch', as well as 'to learn'.

== Attributes ==
The Great Zana is thought to have been a goddess in Illyrian times, the equivalent of the Ancient Greek Artemis and Roman Diana, and perhaps Thracian Bendis. As such she would have been the personification of the Moon and the lady of the forests, protector of animals, guardian of springs and streams, protector of women, as well as distributor of sovereignty. Many statues and other items associated to this goddess have been found in the Shkodra region in northern Albania, maybe more than of any other goddess of the Illyrian pantheon. There is also an exceptional frequency of ancient inscriptions of the Roman era dedicated to the cult of Diana in Albania and the rest of the Balkans, which gives reason to think of an interpretatio romana of an indigenous pre-Roman goddess. Innumerable Albanian folk poems, myths and legends that are dedicated to Zana and her friends have been handed down to modern times.

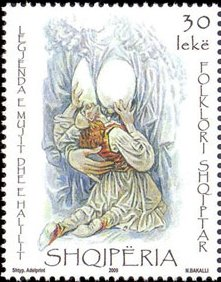
Scene from the epic cycle Kângë Kreshnikësh – Zana feeding young Muji (postage stamp of Albania, 2009).

In Albanian folklore the original Zana is escorted by three wild goats with golden horns. In Northern Albania and Kosovo every mountain is said to have its own zana, who appeared as a fair maiden found bathing naked in mountain streams. The zana is believed to be extremely courageous, a formidable opponent, who can bestow her protection on warriors similarly to Pallas Athena. In Albanian there is a notable expression, Ai ishte trim si zana, meaning, "He was as brave as a zana", used to refer to very courageous individuals. The zana is believed to have the power to petrify humans with a glance; shetuar or shituar is used in the Gheg Albanian dialect for a person that has been paralyzed by a zana.

The zana symbolize the vital energy of human beings. They idealize feminine energy, wild beauty, eternal youth and the joy of nature. The zana appear as warlike nymphs capable of offering simple mortals a part of their own psychophysical and divine power, giving humans strength comparable to that of the drangue. In the Albanian epic cycle Kângë Kreshnikësh, by breastfeeding the young Muji (one of the two heroic brothers and main characters of the songs) the zana empower him with superhuman strength.

=== Fate ===
In northern Albania, the zana are represented—similarly to the ora and to the southern Albanian fatí—as a group of three mythological goddesses who congregate in the night to decide the baby's destiny at birth and distribute their favors. Three types of Fates are believed to exist among the inhabitants of the Dukagjini highlands: e Bardha (the White One) distributes good luck and provides humans well, e Verdha (the Yellow One) distributes bad luck and casts evil spells, and e Zeza (the Black One) decides death.

== Appearances in folklore ==
The zana appear in many folktales and in the Albanian oral tradition. A zana appears, for example, in the Albanian folktale The Lover's Grave. She appears to a young army captain, Bedri, who prostrates himself at her feet and must be reassured that she means him no harm. On the contrary, she warns Bedri to beware a wooden beam and a doe, and that he is not safe when he is "at the root". Bedri goes on to meet a beautiful woman, with whom he elopes, pursued by soldiers who know from his pronunciation of the word for "wooden beam" that he comes from an area with which they are at war. Bedri learns that his beloved's name is Dre, meaning doe, and the soldiers capture and kill the couple outside the town of Nderendje - the name of which means "at the root". They are comparable with the Valkyries of the Nordic mythology, and other branches of Balkan and European folklore like that of the Romanian Zina and southern Slav Vila.

From Albanian literature by Robert Elsie:

The Zana of mount Vizitor provides an idyllic interlude to the fighting. The Great Zana is outraged at witnessing the murder of her childhood companion Tringa. She brings the body back to the Alpine pastures where it is buried ceremoniously at the foot of a linden tree. In a spirit of vengerance the Great Zana calls upon all good men to hasten to the battlefield of Noshiq.

Lahuta e Malcís, a classic work of Albanian folk tradition published in the 1920s, includes several appearances by zana. In one canto the zana of the Sharr Mountains watches over local noblemen as they rally against the Treaty of San Stefano (which awarded areas hitherto under Albanian rule to Prince Nikola of Montenegro), and delights in their speeches and rhetoric. In another, the "great zana" issues a call to arms for all willing Albanian men to avenge the murder of the maiden Tringa by Slav bandits.

== See also ==
- Albanian mythology
- Culture of Albania
- Xana
- Shtojzovalle
- Ora
- Fatia
- Bardha
- Nëna e Vatrës
- Drangue
- Zână

== Sources ==
=== Bibliography ===
- Camaj, Martin; Fox, Leonard (January 1984). Albanian Grammar: With Exercises, Chrestomathy and Glossaries. Otto Harrassowitz Verlag. ISBN 978-3-447-02467-9.
- Chelariu, Ana R. (2023). Romanian Folklore and its Archaic Heritage: A cultural and Linguistic Comparative Study. Springer Nature. ISBN 978-3-031-04051-1.
- Cook, Arthur Bernard (1964) [1914]. Zeus: Zeus, god of the bright sky. Zeus: A Study in Ancient Religion. Vol. 1. Biblo and Tannen.
- Demiraj, Bardhyl (2011). "Rrënjë dhe degë të krishterimit ndër shqiptarë" (PDF). Hylli i Dritës (in Albanian). 2. Shkodër: 58–78.
- Doja, Albert (2005). "Mythology and Destiny" (PDF). Anthropos. 100 (2): 449–462. doi:10.5771/0257-9774-2005-2-449. JSTOR 40466549. S2CID 115147696.
- Elsie, Robert (2001a). A Dictionary of Albanian Religion, Mythology and Folk Culture. London: Hurst & Company. ISBN 1-85065-570-7.
- Elsie, Robert (2001b). Albanian Folktales and Legends. Dukagjini Publishing House.
- Elsie, Robert; Mathie-Heck, Janice (2004). Songs of the Frontier Warriors. Wauconda, Illinois: Bolchazy-Carducci Publishers, Incorporated. ISBN 0-86516-412-6.
- Elsie, Robert (2005). Albanian literature: a short history. I.B. Tauris. pp. 123–125. ISBN 978-1-84511-031-4.
- Galaty, Michael; Lafe, Ols; Lee, Wayne; Tafilica, Zamir (2013). Light and Shadow: Isolation and Interaction in the Shala Valley of Northern Albania. The Cotsen Institute of Archaeology Press. ISBN 978-1931745710.
- Fishta, Gjergj (2005). The Highland Lute. I.B. Tauris. p. 471. ISBN 978-1-84511-118-2.
- Juka, S. S. (1984), Kosova: The Albanians in Yugoslavia in Light of Historical Documents: An Essay, Waldon Press, ISBN 9780961360108
- Kondi, Bledar (2017). "Un regard critique sur l'ethnographie de la mort en Albanie". Ethnologie française. 166 (2): 277–288. doi:10.3917/ethn.172.0277.
- Kuka, Benjamin (1984). Questions of the Albanian Folklore. 8 Nëntori.
- Lurker, Manfred (2004). The Routledge dictionary of gods and goddesses, devils and demons. Routledge. p. 207. ISBN 978-0-415-34018-2.
- Mann, Stuart E. (1948). An Historical Albanian-English Dictionary. Vol. II, N–Z. Longmans, Green and Co., LTD.
- Mato, Martin (2001). "Epos und Mythologie". In Raunig, Walter (ed.). Albanien: Reichtum und Vielfalt alter Kultur. München: Staatliches Museum für Völkerkunde. ISBN 978-3-9807561-2-9.
- Mato, Martin (30 November 1996). "New View on old Text". Albanian Daily News. Tirana: 10.
- Nagy, Levente (2003). "Balcanistica hungarica rediviva". Zeitschrift für Balkanologie. 39 (2): 191–200. ISSN 0044-2356.
- Pipa, Arshi (1993). "The Mythology of Albania". In Bonnefoy, Yves (ed.). American, African, and Old European mythologies. University of Chicago Press. ISBN 0-226-06457-3.
- Poghirc, Cicerone (1987). "Albanian Religion". In Mircea Eliade (ed.). The Encyclopedia of Religion. Vol. 1. New York: MacMillan Publishing Co. pp. 178–180.
- Qafleshi, Muharrem (2011). Opoja dhe Gora ndër shekuj [Opoja and Gora During Centuries]. Albanological Institute of Pristina. ISBN 978-9951-596-51-0.
- Râdulescu, Mircea-Mihai (1996). "Fairies, Flowers and Magic Daco-Romanian zîna and Its Indo-European Cognates". Journal of Indo-European Studies. 24: 333–.
- Treimer, Karl (1971). "Zur Rückerschliessung der illyrischen Götterwelt und ihre Bedeutung für die südslawische Philologie". In Henrik Barić (ed.). Arhiv za Arbanasku starinu, jezik i etnologiju. Vol. I. R. Trofenik. pp. 27–33.
- Zymberi, Isa (1991). Colloquial Albanian. Routledge. p. 142. ISBN 978-0-415-05663-2.
