= Enji (deity) =

Albanian fire god and cult

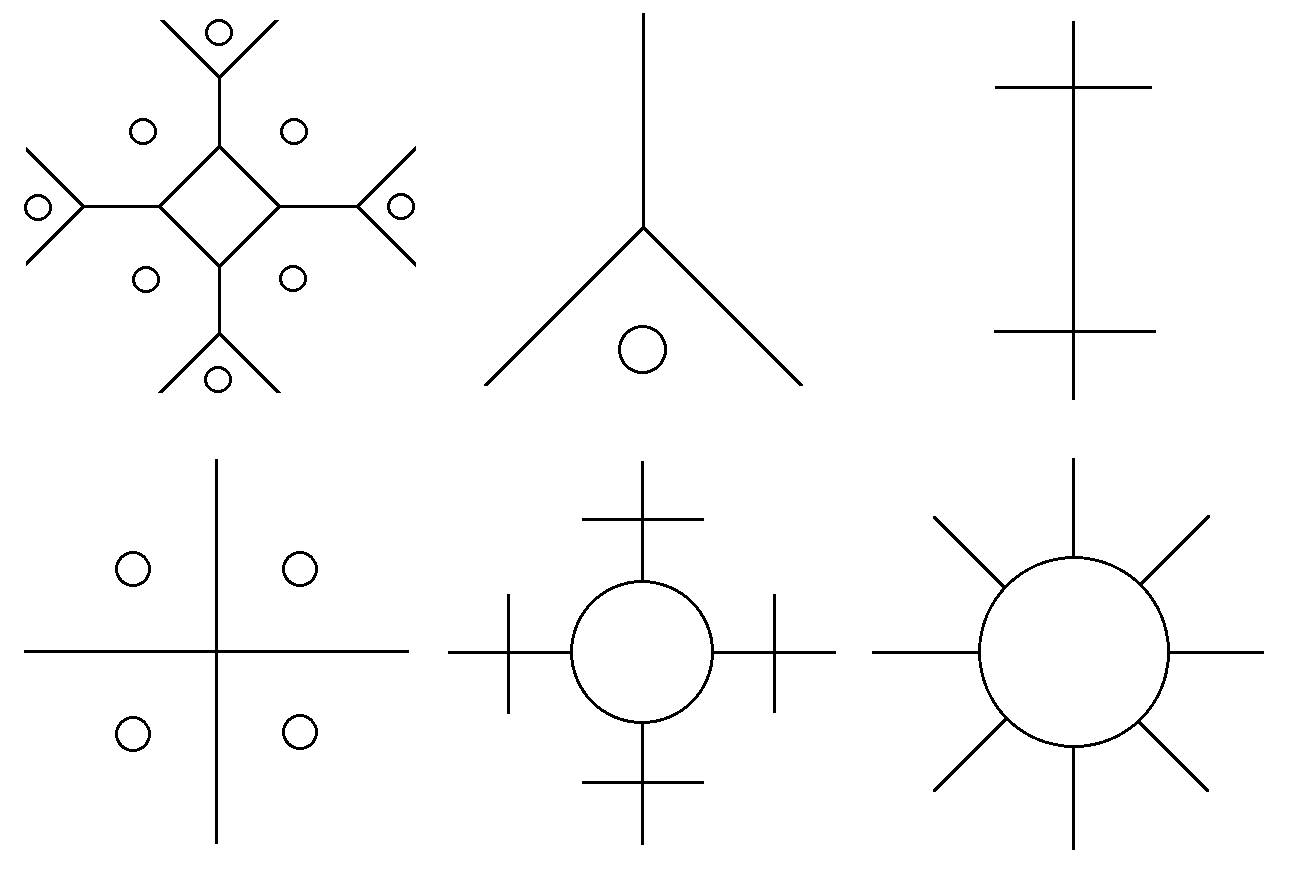
Sun (Dielli) and Fire symbols in Albanian traditional tattoo patterns (19th century). The cross (also swastika in some tattoos) is the Albanian traditional way to represent the deified Fire – Zjarri, evidently also called with the theonym Enji. Also appearing in other expressions of Albanian traditional art, they represent celestial, light, fire and hearth worship, expressing the favor of the light within the dualistic struggle between light and darkness.

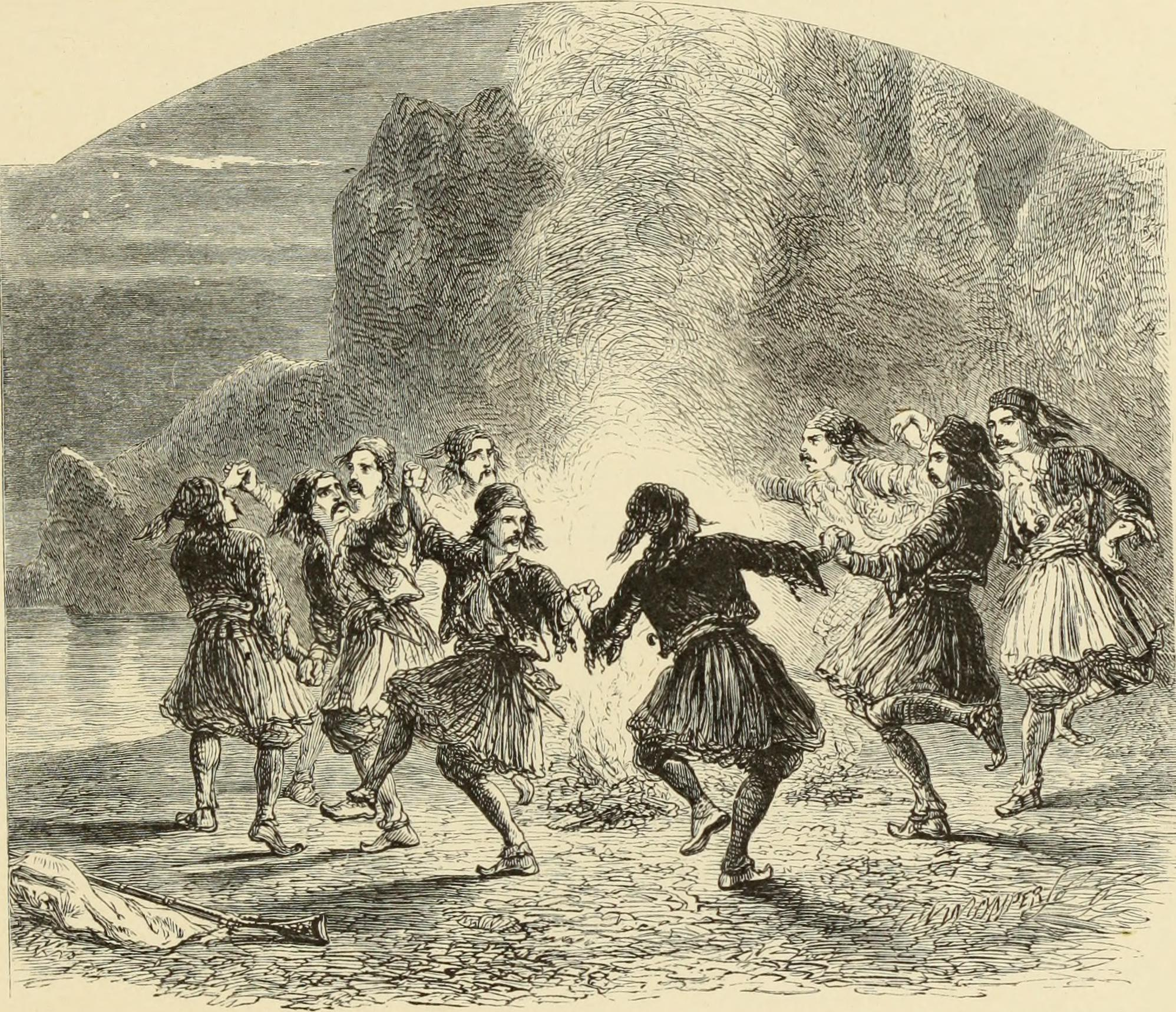
Albanian warrior dance in circle around fire, drawing from the book Childe Harold's Pilgrimage written by Lord Byron in the early 19th century. Practiced for several hours with very short intervals, the dance gets new vigour from the words of the accompanying song that starts with a battle cry invoking war drums, and which is of a piece with the movement and usually changed only once or twice during the whole performance. The ritual purifying fire is traditionally used by Albanians, in particular singing and dancing around it, to gain protection and energizing from its supernatural power.

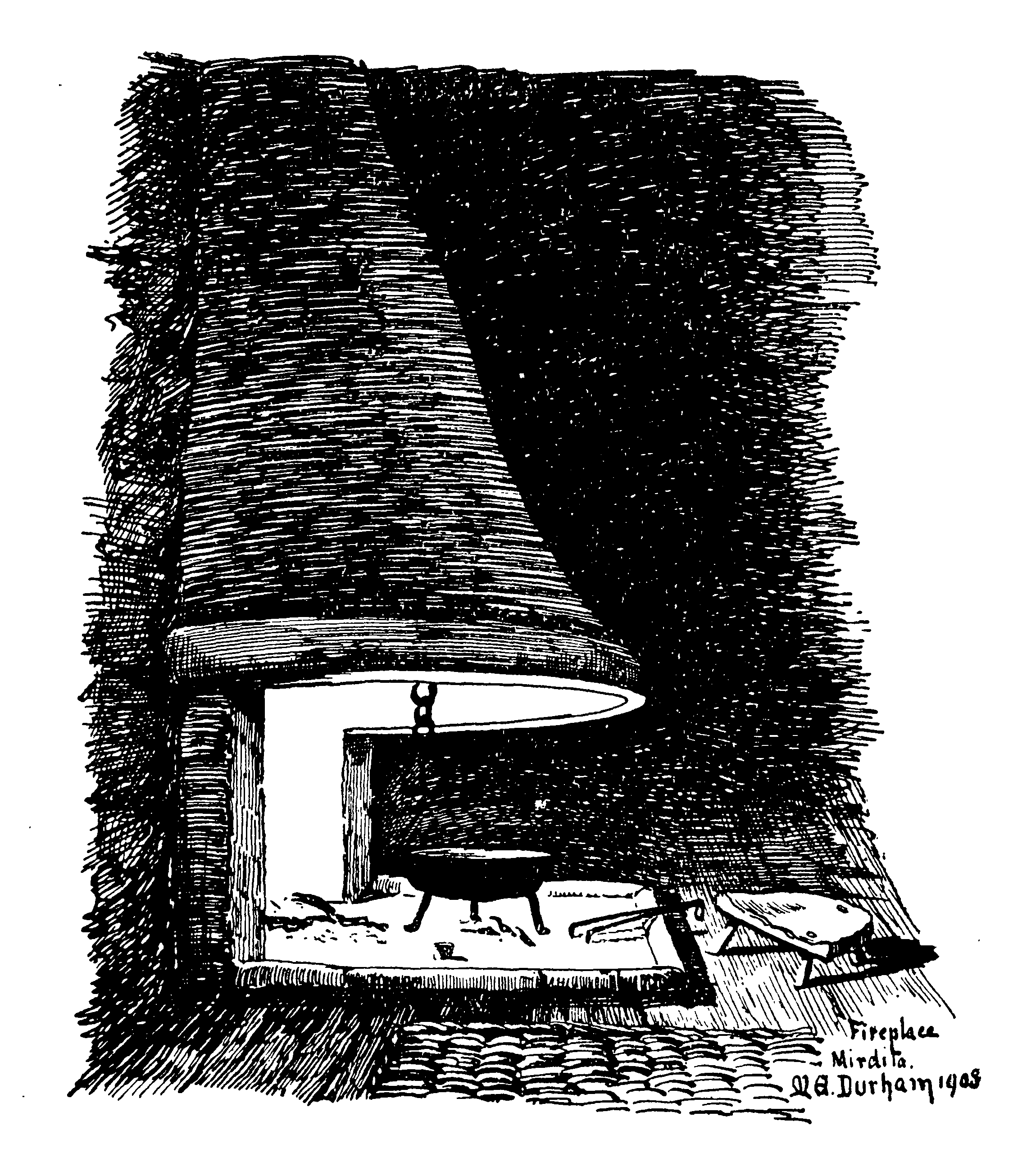
Hearth fire lighting a dark room in a house of Mirdita, northern Albania. Drawn by Edith Durham in 1909.

Enji (Albanian: [ɛɲi]) is the old name of the fire god in the Albanian pagan mythology evidently contained in the weekday name that was dedicated to him – e enjte – the Albanian word for Thursday. The Fire – Zjarri – is deified in Albanian tradition as releaser of light and heat with the power to ward off darkness and evil, affect cosmic phenomena and give strength to the Sun (Dielli, who is worshiped as the god of light, sky and weather, giver of life, health and energy, and all-seeing eye), and as sustainer of the continuity between life and afterlife and between the generations. The divine power of Fire is used for the hearth and the rituals, including calendar fires, sacrificial offerings, divination, purification, and protection from big storms and other potentially harmful events. Fire worship and rituals are associated with the cult of the Sun (Dielli), the cult of the hearth (vatër) and the ancestor, and the cult of fertility in agriculture and animal husbandry. Fire rituals that are commonly found among Indo-European peoples, including the Albanians, have been firstly attested by the Vedas, with hymns dedicated to the fire god Agni. Described in written sources since 1482, the Albanian fire rituals have been historically fought by the Christian clergy, without success. The cult of the mystic fire and the fire ritual practices have played a prominent role in the lives of all the Albanian people until the 20th century, and in rural areas they continue to be important for Albanian traditional customs even in the present days.

The theonym from which Thursday was named in Albanian is considered to have been attested in antiquity in Illyrian theophoric names with the Latin spelling En(n)-. He was presumably worshiped by the Illyrians in antiquity and he may have been the most prominent god of the Albanian pantheon in Roman times by interpreting Jupiter, when weekday names were formed in the Albanian language. The belief in a prominent fire and wind god, who was referred to as I Verbti ("the blind one"), and who was often regarded more powerful than the Christian God, survived in northern Albania until recent times. Under Christianization the god of fire was demonized and considered a false god, and it was spread about that anyone who invoked him would be blinded by fire. The purifying power of fire underlies the Albanian folk belief according to which the fire god is the enemy of uncleanliness and the opponent of filth.

In Albanian tradition Fire is deeply respected. To spit into it is taboo. Albanian solemn oaths are taken "by fire", and the worst curse formulas are cast for the extinguishing of the individual's, family's and clan's fire. The lineage is identified with an original fire, and the members of a same tribe/clan are "from the same fire". Zjarri i Vatrës ("the Fire of the Hearth") is regarded as the offspring of the Sun and the sustainer of the continuity between the world of the living and that of the dead and between the generations, ensuring the survival of the lineage (fis or farë). The absence of fire in a house is traditionally considered a great curse. Protectors of the hearth are Gjarpri i Vatrës ("the Serpent of the Hearth"), a household benign serpent, and Nëna e Vatrës ("the Mother of the Hearth").

Zjarret e Vitit ("Ritual Calendar Fires") are associated with the cosmic cycle and the rhythms of agricultural and pastoral life. The ritual collective fires (based on the house, kinship, or neighborhood) or bonfires in yards (especially on high places) lit before sunrise to celebrate the main traditional Albanian festivities such as Dita e Verës (spring equinox), Shëngjergji, Shën Gjini–Shën Gjoni (summer solstice), the winter festivals (winter solstice), or mountain pilgrimages, often accompanied by animal sacrifices, are related to the cult of the Sun, and in particular they are practiced with the function to give strength to the Sun and to ward off evil according to the old beliefs. Zjarri i Gjallë, Zjarri i Egër, or Zjarri i Keq – traditionally kindled with rudimentary fire making tools and techniques – is the ritual purifying Fire used for the cleansing, protection, healing, and energizing of livestock and humans. Albanian folk beliefs regard the lightning as Zjarri i Qiellit ("the Fire of the Sky") and consider it as the "weapon of the deity". During big storms with torrential rains, lightning and hail, which often cause great damage to agriculture, livestock, and to the rural economy in general, Albanians traditionally bring outdoors Fire as a continuous chain or in a container, as well as ember and fire-related metallic objects, seeking assistance from the supernatural power of the Fire, in order to turn the storm away and to avert the harms it can cause to the community.

== Name ==
=== Documentation ===
The root of the Albanian theonym contained in the word for "thursday" is thought to be found in antiquity in the Pannonian-Illyrian area, as well as in Messapia/Iapygia in southern Italy such as Ennius, interpreted as a theophoric name: "the one dedicated to En". Other examples with the same root and with the suffix -c (-k) are Enica, Enicus, Enicenius, and with the suffix -n are Eninna, Ennenia, and the short forms Enna and Enno. Compounds of the divine name En are Enoclia "En, the famous", and Malennius containing the Albanian term mal "mountain", interpreted as "the one dedicated to En of/from the mountain".

In his work Speculum Confessionis (1621) Pjetër Budi recorded the Albanian term tegnietenee madhe for the observance of Maundy Thursday (S.C., 148, vv. 26, 89). In his Latin-Albanian dictionary (Dictionarium latino-epiroticum, 1635), Frang Bardhi recorded dita ehegnete as the Albanian translation of Latin dies Iovis. In 1820, the French scholar François Pouqueville recorded two old Albanian terms: e igniete and e en-gnitia. In 1879 Albanian scholar and language master Kostandin Kristoforidhi translated Zeus / Δία of the original Greek text with the Albanian Ἒνετε Enete, and Hermes / Ἑρμῆν with the Albanian Μερκούρ Merkur.

Modern dialectal variations of "Thursday" include: Gheg Albanian: e êjte, e ẽjtë; Tosk Albanian: e enjtë; Arbëreshë Albanian: e ègn'te, e énjite, e ente, e engjte, e ínjte.

The noun zjarmi "fire" is firstly attested in the oldest known Albanian book – Gjon Buzuku's Missal, published in 1555.

=== Etymology ===
==== Enji ====
The names of weekdays in Albanian are calques of Latin names. Since enjte appears to be the Albanian translation of Latin Iovis dies ('Day of Jove'), the god Enj- or En(ni) of the early Albanian pantheon may have been seen as the equivalent of Roman Jupiter.

The Albanian term enjte ('Thursday') is considered to be a te-adjective presumably descending from the Proto-Albanian stem *agni-, ultimately from *h₁n̥gʷnis, the archaic Proto-Indo-European word for 'fire' as an active force. The PIE name is also continued in the name of the Vedic fire god Agni, who in Vedic religion is associated with the Sun in the heavens, with lightning in the clouds, and with both hearth and ritual fire on the earth among humans. Fire rituals that are commonly found among Indo-European peoples, including the Albanians, have been firstly attested by the Vedas, with hymns dedicated to the god Agni.

Historical reconstruction

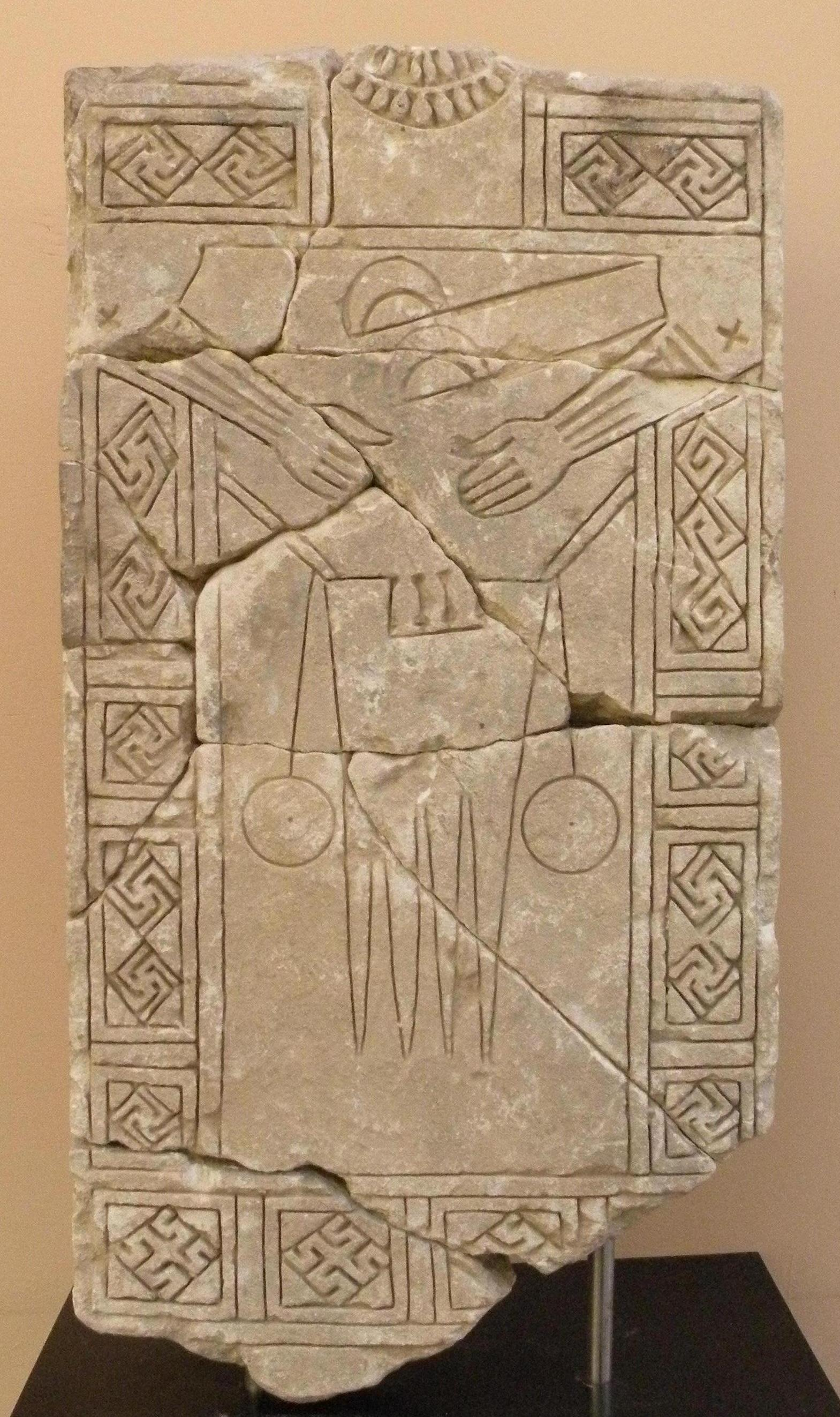
Paleo-Balkan tattooing on 610-550 BC Daunian funerary stele from Apulia. The cross (including swastika) has been interpreted as a symbol of the fire god, Enji.

According to Indo-Europeanist Karl Treimer, Illyrians worshiped a fire god named Enji, related to the Vedic fire god Agni, and descending from the stem *H₁n̥gʷnis, the Proto-Indo-European divinised fire. In the Illyrian pantheon the fire deity would have expanded his function considerably, therefore ousting the cosmic-heavenly deity, becoming the most distinguished Illyrian god in Roman times at the time when the weekday names were formed in the Albanian language, as Thursday (e enj-te) was dedicated to him; in this view the Latin Jovis dies was equated to the Illyrian fire god Enji rather than to the Illyrian Sky father, thought to have been Zot, from Proto-Albanian *dźie̅u ̊ *a(t)t (a cognate of PIE *Dyḗus ph_{2}tḗr). Nevertheless, as indicated by the wide set of cultic traditions dedicated to the Sun, the sky cult appears to have been dominated by the Sun-god (Dielli), to whom Sunday (e diel) was dedicated. With the coming of Christianity, En would have been demoted to demonic status, although his name has been preserved in the Albanian language to refer to Thursday (enj-te).

==== Zjarri ====
The Albanian term zjarr, zjarm, zjerm, etc., "fire", is inherited from Proto-Indo-European *gʷʰermno- "warm". Notably within the Palaeo-Balkanic IE group, it is cognate to Greek: θερμός thermos and Armenian: ǰerm.

== Albanian fire worship, cult, and practices ==
Already described in written sources since 1482, the cult of the mystic fire and the fire ritual practices have played a prominent role in the lives of all the Albanian people until the 20th century, and in rural areas they continue to be important for Albanian traditional customs even in the present days. In Albanian tradition the fire worship and rituals are associated with the cult of the Sun (Dielli), the cult of the hearth (vatër) and the ancestor, and the cult of fertility in agriculture and animal husbandry. Calendar fires (Albanian: zjarret e vitit) are associated with the cosmic cycle and the rhythms of agricultural and pastoral life. The practices associated with ritual fires among Albanians have been historically fought by the Christian clergy, without success.

=== Symbolism ===
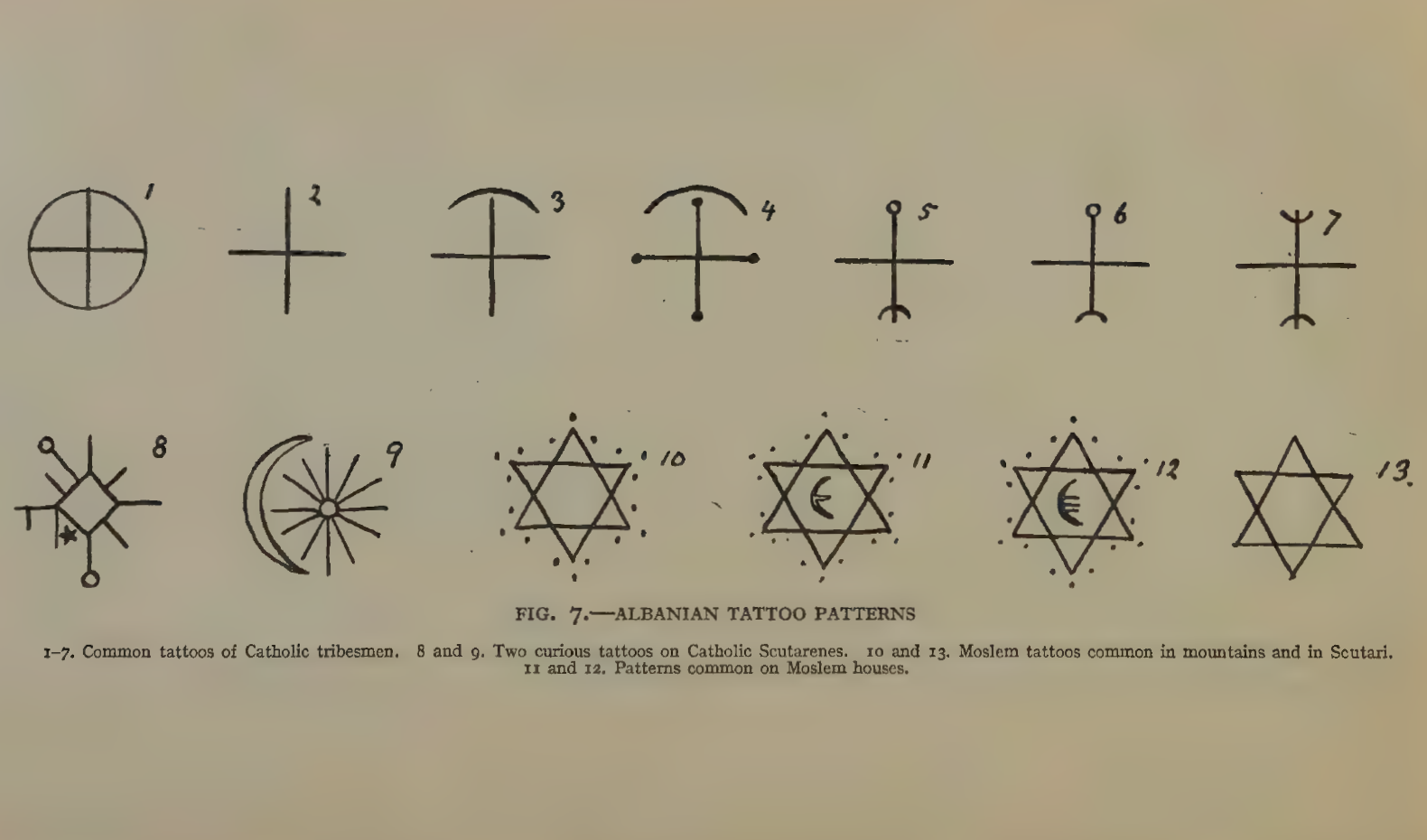
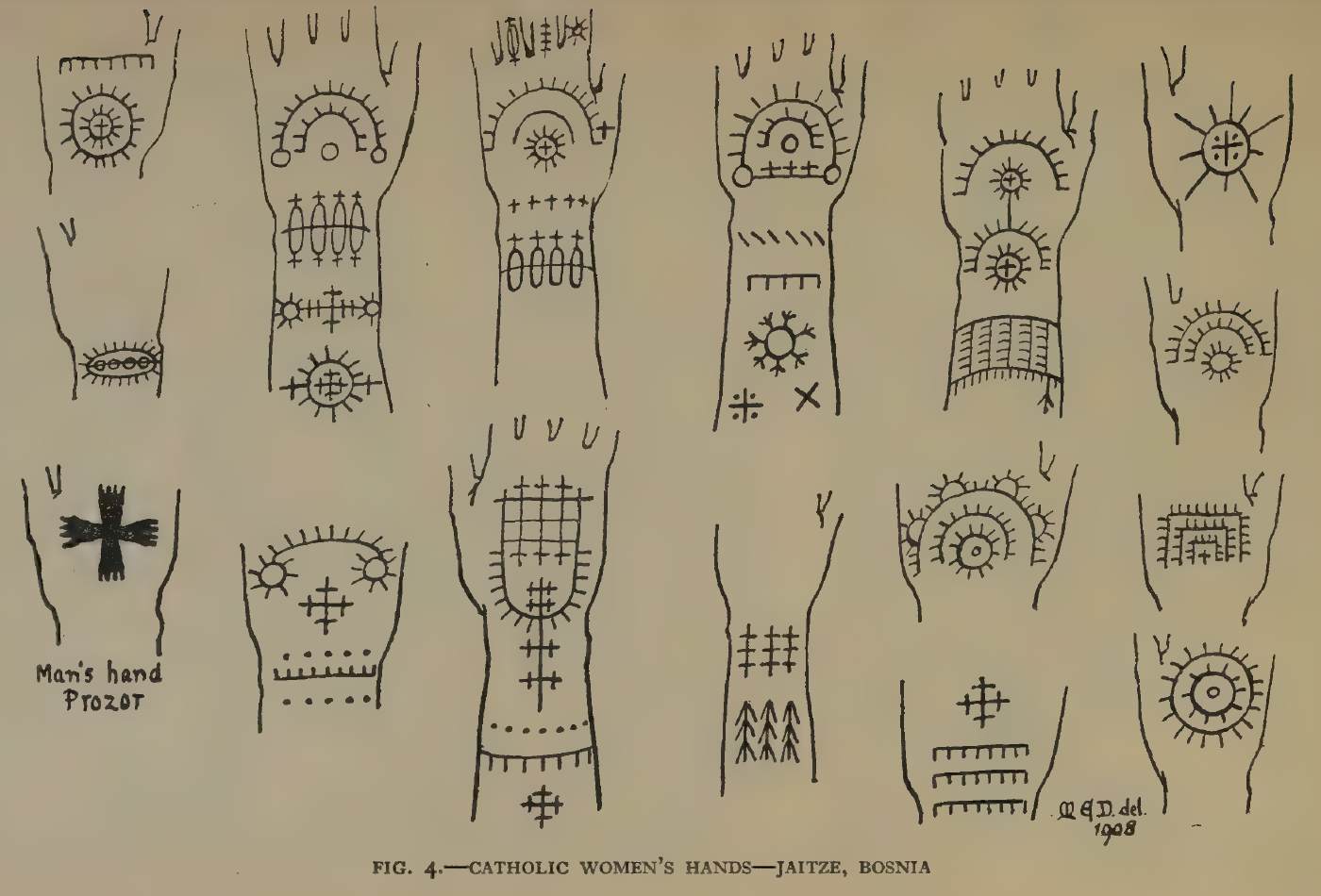
Tattoo patterns of northern Albanians (top); tattoo patterns of Catholic women (and one man) in Bosnia (bottom). Drawn by Edith Durham in the early 20th century. Many of those patterns also appear on Albanian traditional art (graves, jewellery, embroidery, and house carvings).

Edith Durham, who extensively studied Balkan traditional tattooing with fieldwork research, was able to thoroughly explain the patterns of traditional tattoos only after asking to Albanians of Thethi–Shala for a description of all the little lines (or twigs) that accompanied a semicircle incised on an old gravestone. They answered that those twigs were "the light coming from the Moon, of course". For Albanians, the twigs or little lines were the traditional way to represent light, emanated from the Sun (Dielli) and from the Moon (Hana), which was often represented as a crescent. So, the patterns of Catholic tattoos in Bosnia, which until then were known as "circles, semicircles, and lines or twigs", eventually were clearly explained as compounds of rayed (emanating light) suns, moons, and crosses, from an expression of Nature-worship and hearth-worship. Furthermore, the crosses (including swastikas) have been explained by scholars as symbols of the deified Fire, and in particular of the fire god Enji.

Also appearing in other expressions of Albanian traditional art (graves, jewellery, embroidery, and house carvings), those patterns represent celestial, light, fire and hearth worship, expressing the favor of the light within the dualistic struggle between light and darkness in Albanian mythology.

=== Prominent fire god ===
The belief in a fire god, who was referred to as I Verbti ("the blind one"), survived in northern Albania until recent times. Under Christianization this deity was demonized and considered a false god, and it was spread about that anyone who invoked him would be blinded by fire. However, in folk beliefs the god I Verbti was often considered more powerful than the Christian God. The struggle between the old and the new god and the former predominant popularity of I Verbti among Albanians is expressed in a traditional tale narrated from a Christian point of view. The purifying power of fire underlies the Albanian folk belief according to which the god I Verbti is the enemy of uncleanliness and the opponent of filth.

=== Ritual and hearth Fire ===
==== Solemn oaths and curse formulas ====
In Albanian tradition Fire is deeply respected. To spit into it is taboo. Albanian solemn oaths are taken "by fire", such as "by this fire" (për këtë zjarr!), "by this fire and if I lie, may my hearth fire be extinguished! (për këtë zjarr e mu shoftë vatra).

The worst Albanian curse formulas are cast for the extinguishing of the individual's, family's and clan's fire. Curse formulas include: "may your fire be extinguished!" (T'u shoftë zjarri!), "may your hearth fire be extinguished!" (T'u shoftë vatra), "may your candle go out" (T'u shoftë kandili), "may your light turn off" (T'u shoftë drita).

==== Sun's offspring and tribe's continuity ====
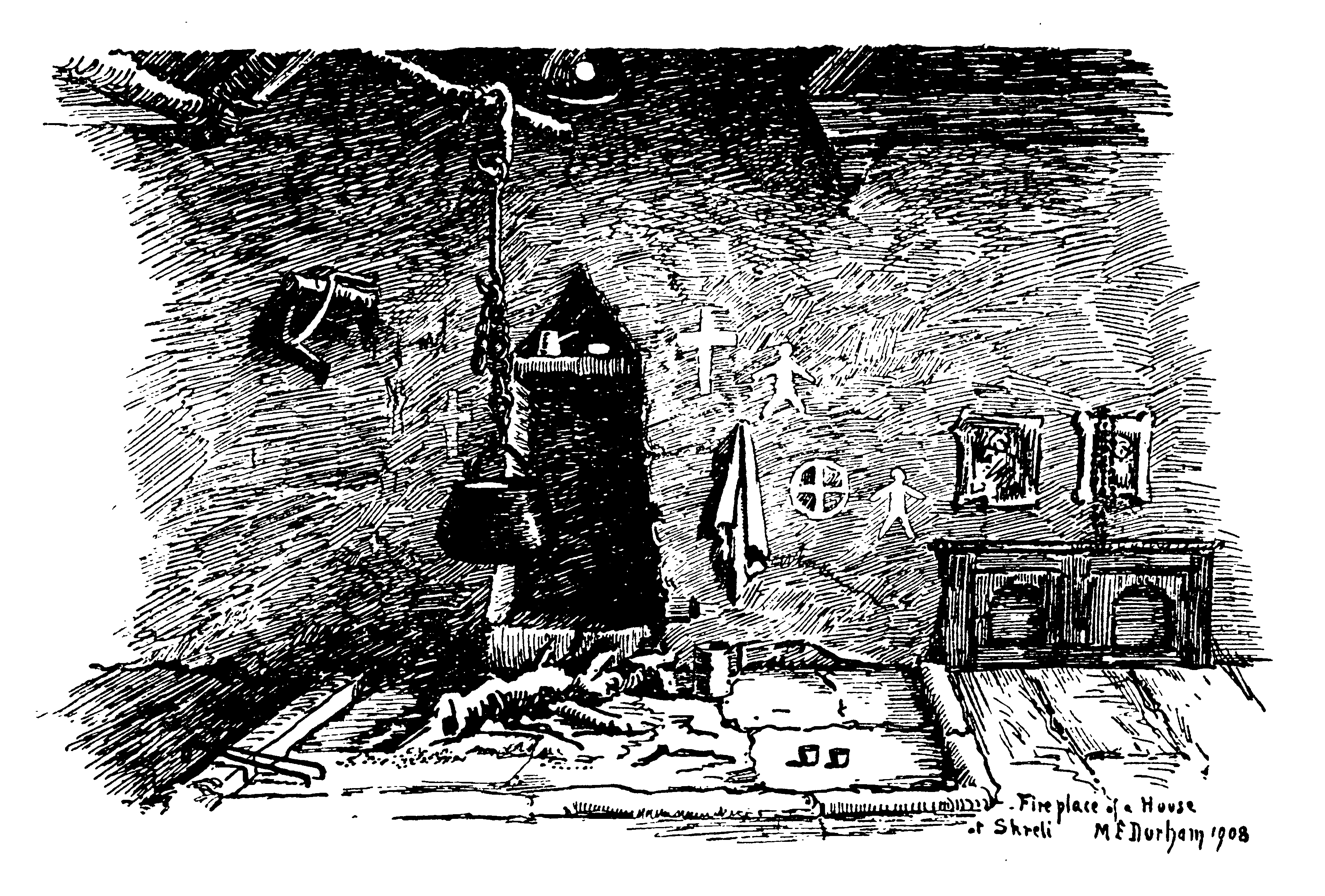
Fireplace (votër) of a house of Shkreli, northern Albania, drawn by Edith Durham in 1909.

In Albanian tradition the fire of the hearth (zjarri i vatrës) is deified, and it is regarded as the Sun's offspring (pjella e Diellit), which is symbolized by the fire hearth (vatra e zjarrit). The place of the ignition of fire is traditionally built in the center of the house and of circular shape representing the Sun. Traditionally the fire of the hearth, zjarri i vatrës, is identified with the existence of the family and its extinguishing is considered a bad omen for the family.

The hearth fire is considered the sustainer of the continuity between the world of the living and that of the dead. After death, the souls of the ancestors (hije) assume a divine connotation and remain in contact with the family through the fire of the domestic hearth, of which they are considered protectors. The fire of the domestic hearth is considered to ensure the continuity of the tribe (fis) from generation to generation. In Albanian tradition, indeed, the lineage is identified with an original fire (zjarr); the members of a same tribe/clan are "from the same fire" (pe një zjarri). The fire burns into the hearth (vatër), where it assumes another connotation besides the primordial concept: the fire of the domestic hearth is considered also as a place of common existence and commensality.

Some of the information Catholic priest Ernesto Cozzi had given Edith Durham about Albanian folk beliefs and customs of the very early 19th century was recorded by her, also in particular about the fire cult in northern Albania:

He says that great ceremony is observed when the fire is for the first time kindled in the hearth of a newly built house. The Zoti i Shpis [master of the house] must enter alone, stark naked, while the rest of the family wait outside. The fire has already been laid on the hearth & into this the Zoti i Shpis fires his revolver thus lighting it. He then goes out & dresses & all enter & take possession of the house.

Rose Wilder Lane (1923) provided the following description regarding the northern Albanian fire cult:

The bride carries with her from her home one invariable gift—a pair of fire tongs. When she arrives at her husband's house she takes a humble place in the corner, standing, her hands folded on her breast, her eyes downcast, and for three days and nights she is required to remain in that position... this custom remains from the old days when the father of each house was also the priestly guardian of the fire, and anyone coming to ask for a light from it stood reverently in that position, silent, before the hearth, until the father priest gave it to him. The bride, newcomer in the family, is a suppliant for the gift of fire, of life, of the mystery that continues the race.

Mythological figures protectors of the hearth are Gjarpri i Vatrës ("the Serpent of the Hearth"), a household benign serpent, and Nëna e Vatrës ("the Mother of the Hearth").

==== Divination (pyromancy) ====
Several forms of divination by means of fire (pyromancy) are traditionally practiced by Albanians.

Proofs for determining the placement of a house plot among Albanians were mainly of mystic nature, and sometimes of techno-practical nature. The latter were easier to deal with, as they consisted in checking a place with or without moisture, a strong subsoil or a slippery soil, etc. As for the mystical aspects, such as luck and prosperity, they were harder to detect, and several concerns emerged about them. The elders, who preserved much historical and legendary knowledge, were also consulted. Houses could certainly be built in the land of the ancestors whose permanent prosperity was well-known, or in the place where a prosperous cattle stable used to be located. A mystic test, widespread in all Albanian lands, consisted in performing a particular ritual with ashes poured in the area of the future domestic hearth (vatër), repeating it three times during three nights, and there were special people who knew how to decipher the signs that appeared in the ashes. Another test was performed using fire, which was kindled at the center of the tested plot on a calm and windless night with waxing moon. If the smoke spread over the ground in a soft and uniform manner, it was a good sign; if the smoke went up and only from one side, it was a bad sign and another place was to be tested. Ash and fire are clearly related to the cult of fire and the hearth, regarded as symbols of the continuity of life across generations, showing whether the future generations will prosper in the new plot or they will encounter misfortunes, perhaps even to the point of extinction or abandonment of the new house.

==== Purification ====
Traditionally kindled with rudimentary fire making tools and techniques, Zjarri i Gjallë, Zjarri i Egër, or Zjarri i Keq, is the ritual purifying Fire used for the cleansing, protection, healing, and energizing of livestock and humans. During traditional feasts Albanians use to sing and dance around the purifying fire in order to use its supernatural power for protection against evil.

A traditional ritual practiced for the livestock protection or healing from possible diseases is to shroud them in smoke. It has been usually performed in the spring, before livestock goes out for grazing, in a fire traditionally made with rudimentary tools. For this purpose, in many cases, the fire is lit either with flints and reeds or by the friction of two sticks (hence referred to as Zjarri i Gjallë "Living Fire"). In some regions the sticks (of hazelnut, for instance) for fire making are traditionally obtained after being put on the ceiling of the house near the hearth fire for three years. Sticks dried in this way are traditionally rubbed by two young and powerful men. Some dried moss is also usually put in the point of friction, which is ignited by fire from the friction. From the flame caused by the friction of two pieces of wood, a big fire was made with scraps, rags and straw. Livestock are passed through the smoke of the fire thus created. In some cases, coals are taken from this fire, they are immersed and dissolved in water, and the mixture thus created is used to sprinkle the livestock.

For prevention, protection, and healing from the evil eye (syri i keq), other rituals with fire, smoke, ashes and embers are practiced. A typical ritual performed by the oldest woman of the family consists in taking a bunch of dry grass and burning it somewhere near the cloth that is being woven, so that the smoke goes towards it. If the grass crackled during the burning, even the evil eye would explode and not be able to do any harm, granting the good luck of the cloth. Ashes and embers are believed to have protective and healing properties, especially for children. In order to get protection against the evil eye, the face of a child is covered with ashes. When children have been taken by the evil eye, they are washed on the ashes. Other Albanian rituals to avert evil, illness, and harm in general are performed with fire and fire-related objects, using the fire's supernatural power.

==== In traditional feasts and particular events ====
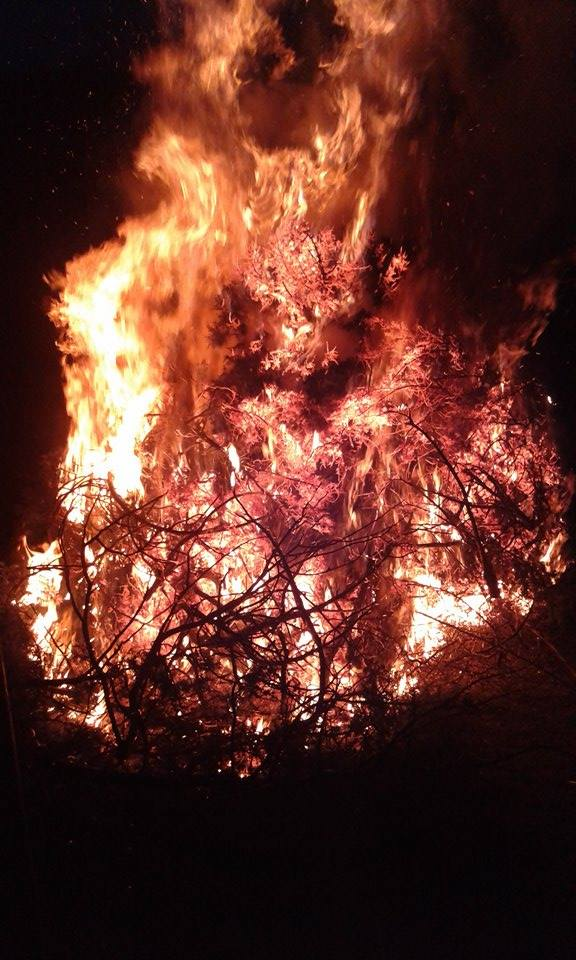
Zjarri for the celebration of Dita e Verës in Tropojë, northern Albania. Kindled on the eve or before sunrise in order to give strength to the Sun (Dielli), people dance and sing around it or jump across it, a ritual practiced for the end of winter, renewal, purification and apotropaic purposes.

The ritual collective fires (based on the house, kinship, or neighborhood) or bonfires in yards (especially on high places) lit before sunrise to celebrate the main traditional Albanian festivities such as Dita e Verës (spring equinox), Shëngjergji, Shën Gjini–Shën Gjoni (summer solstice), the winter festivals (winter solstice), or mountain pilgrimages, often accompanied by animal sacrifices, are related to the cult of the Sun, and in particular they are practiced with the function to give strength to the Sun and to ward off evil according to the old beliefs.

Albanian traditional festivities around the winter solstice celebrate the return of the Sun for summer and the lengthening of the days. The rites related to the cult of vegetation, which expressed the desire for increased production in agriculture and animal husbandry, were accompanied by animal sacrifices to the fire, lighting pine trees at night, luck divination tests with crackling in the fire or with coins in ritual bread, making and consuming ritual foods, performing various magical ritualistic actions in livestock, fields, vineyards and orchards, and so on. Nata e Buzmit, "Yule log's night", is celebrated between December 22 and January 6. Buzmi is a ritualistic piece of wood (or several pieces of wood) that is put to burn in the fire of the hearth on the night of a winter celebration that falls after the return of the Sun for summer (after the winter solstice), sometimes on the night of Kërshëndella on December 24 (Christmas Eve), sometimes on the night of kolendra, or sometimes on New Year's Day or on any other occasion around the same period, a tradition that is originally related to the cult of the Sun (Dielli). A series of rituals of a magical character are performed with the buzmi, which, based on old beliefs, aims at agricultural plant growth and for the prosperity of production in the living thing (production of vegetables, trees, vineyards, etc.).

The old pagan cult of the mountain and mountain tops is widespread among Albanians. Pilgrimages to sacred mountains take place regularly during the year. This ancient practice is still preserved today, notably in Tomorr, Pashtrik, Lybeten, Gjallicë, Rumia, Koritnik, Shkëlzen, Mount Krujë, Shelbuem, Këndrevicë, Maja e Hekurave, Shëndelli and many others. In Albanian folk beliefs the mountain worship is strictly related to the cult of Nature in general, and the cult of the Sun in particular. Prayers to the Sun, ritual bonfires, and animal sacrifices have been common practices performed by Albanians during the ritual pilgrimage on mountain tops.

In his short autobiographic book My Life in Albania (Italian: La mia vita in Albania, dated to 1881–1882), Lazër Tusha from Shkodër (the first known Albanian autobiographer) described and explained in detail the customs, embroidery, and folk beliefs and superstitions of the Albanians. In particular he reported that in non-religious traditional festivities such as the eve of Shëngjon's day (Saint John's Eve, after sunset of 23 June and before sunrise of 24 June), people used to light fires and jump across them. At celebrations, but also at eclipses, or when about to cross a fast-flowing river, Albanians used to fire into the air with their firearms. This practice falls within the widespread Albanian fire rituals of apotropaic nature to ward off evil and darkness, also performed during storms.

The summer solstice is celebrated by Albanians often with the name Shën Gjini–Shën Gjoni, but also with the name Festa e Malit or Festa e Bjeshkës ("Mountain Feast"), as well as Festa e Blegtorisë ("Livestock Feast"). It is associated with the production in agricultural and livestock activities. To celebrate this feast, bonfires are traditionally lit where straw is burned and ashes are thrown on the ground, as a "burning for regeneration" ritual. Tribal or community fires are traditionally made with straw, with people jumping across them. In some regions plumes of burning chaff were carried in the air, running through the fields and hills. The ashes of the straw that burned in the ritual fires of this event are traditionally thrown to the field for good luck.

A typical ritual practiced in the Opojë region before sunrise during major traditional festivities such as Dita e Verës (Verëza) or Shëngjergji consists in young people performing a dance on the "way of the Sun", in the east–west direction near the burning ritual fire, with which evil spirits, demons that endanger health, purification, prosperity, blessing and the beginning of the seasons are burned.

Another ritual practiced during Dita e Verës in the Korçë region and called "Spring ritual" has been described as follows:

"In the closed circle dance, having the fire in the center, the first ritual element is found, interlaced with choreographic motives, which classify this dance in the ritual category. The cult of fire, an important basic and ancient element, and the closed circle of the performers, a very important fact for the ritualistic choreography, create the main axis of the dance."

On the feast of Verëza, in Opojë girls go from house to house early in the morning, and two by two they go near the fire of the hearth and stir it saying to the lady of the house: Oj e zonja shpisë a e qite renin e flisë. Meanwhile, the lady of the house gives them two chicken eggs. In the morning of Verëza and Shëngjergji, the old lady of the house ties knots to the chain of the hearth and says an incantation formula, then she lights the fire, which with all its power burns the demons and evil.

Sacrificial offerings to the deities associated with the hearth are traditionally practiced by Albanians at feasts, by throwing some of the food they prepared into the fire of the domestic hearth and around the hearth.

==== Lightning and storms ====
During big storms with torrential rains, lightning and hail, which often cause great damage to agriculture, livestock, and to the rural economy in general, Albanians traditionally bring outdoors Fire as a continuous chain or in a container, as well as ember and fire-related metallic objects, seeking assistance from the supernatural power of the Fire, in order to turn the storm away and to avert the harms it can cause to the community.

The practice has been interpreted either as a form of prayer to appease the weather god in order to turn the storm away, or an act to give strength to the divine hero drangue for his struggle against the kulshedra, the demon of darkness and evil that causes the storms. Indeed, Albanian folk beliefs regard the lightning as Zjarri i Qiellit ("the Fire of the Sky") and consider it as the "weapon of the deity" (arma/shtiza/pushka e zotit). An Albanian word to refer to the lightning is rrufeja, related to rhomphaia, an ancient polearm.

A similar practice linking the lightning and the hearth fire is documented by 6th century BCE plaques from Lake Shkodra, which belonged to the Illyrian tribal area of what was referred in historical sources to as the Labeatae in later times. Each of those plaques portray simultaneously sacred representations of the sky and the sun, and symbolism of lightning and fire, as well as the tree of life and birds (eagles). In those plaques there is a mythological representation of the celestial deity: the Sun deity animated with a face and two wings, throwing lightning into a fire altar (the main thunderbolt that reaches the fire altar is also represented as a polearm at the extremity), which in some plaques is held by two men (sometimes on two boats).

== The hero Zjermi ==
Zjermi or Zjerma (lit. "the Fire") is the name of one of the twin protagonists of the Albanian folk tale The Twins. He is born in particular conditions and with the Sun on his forehead, while his twin brother – Handa – with the Moon on his forehead. After separating from his brother in roads that are chosen by their horses, Zjermi, while approaching the Temple of the Sun during his journey, learns from an old man that kulshedra (a demon of darkness and evil) has blocked the source of the river leaving the city in drought. In exchange for releasing the water, the kulshedra has requested and obtained a sacrificial offering of a beautiful maiden daily to her. Eventually Zjermi slays the kulshedra with his silver sword and frees the king's daughter who has been offered as the daily sacrifice to the monster – Bardhakuqja, who eventually marries Zjermi. Zjermi also rescues his brother Handa and other heroes who have been petrified by the shtriga in their attempt to find and reach e Bukura e Dheut ("the Earthly Beauty").

In a variant of the tale, before reaching the city that is harmed by the kulshedra, Zjermi rescues a drangue called Zef. Zjermi and Zef become blood brothers, and when Zjermi fights the kulshedra, Zef and other drangues come in his aid striking the kulshedra with thunders and weakening her before she is slain by Zjermi.

== See also ==
- Albanian paganism
- Agni
- Atar
- Illyrian religion
- Nymphaion (fire sanctuary)
- Perëndi
- Prende
- Zojz (deity)
- Zjerm (song)

== Sources ==
=== Bibliography ===
- Brahaj, Jaho (2007). Flamuri i Kombit Shqiptar: origjina, lashtësia. Enti Botues "Gjergj Fishta". ISBN 9789994338849.
- Çabej, Eqrem (1966). "Albanische Volkskunde". Südost-Forschungen (25): 333–387.
- De Rapper, Gilles (2012). "Blood and Seed, Trunk and Hearth: Kinship and Common Origin in southern Albania". In Hemming, Andreas; Kera, Gentiana; Pandelejmoni, Enriketa (eds.). Albania: Family, Society and Culture in the 20th century. LIT Verlag Münster. pp. 79–95. ISBN 9783643501448.
- Demiraj, Bardhyl; Neri, Sergio (2020). "ZJARR -i ~ *ZJARM -i". Wörterbuch – DPEWA. DPEWA - Digitales Philologisch-Etymologisches Wörterbuch des Altalbanischen.
- Doja, Albert (2005). "Mythology and Destiny" (PDF). Anthropos. 100 (2): 449–462. doi:10.5771/0257-9774-2005-2-449. JSTOR 40466549. S2CID 115147696.
- Doli, Flamur (2009). "Decoration from the house snake cult belief system, as evidenced in Kosovan vernacular architecture". Thesis Kosova (1): 127–144.
- Durham, Edith (1928a). High Albania. LO Beacon Press. ISBN 978-0-8070-7035-2.
- Durham, Edith (1928b). Some tribal origins, laws and customs of the Balkans.
- Elsie, Robert (2001). A dictionary of Albanian religion, mythology and folk culture. NYU Press. p. 259. ISBN 978-1-85065-570-1.
- Galaty, Michael; Lafe, Ols; Lee, Wayne; Tafilica, Zamir (2013). Light and Shadow: Isolation and Interaction in the Shala Valley of Northern Albania. The Cotsen Institute of Archaeology Press. ISBN 978-1931745710.
- Gjoni, Irena (2012). Marrëdhënie të miteve dhe kulteve të bregdetit të Jonit me areale të tjera mitike (PhD) (in Albanian). Tirana: University of Tirana, Faculty of History and Philology.
- Halimi, Zanita; Halimi-Statovci, Drita; Xhemaj, Ukë (2011). Rite dhe Aktualiteti [Rites and Contemporariness/Present Time] (PDF). Translated by Lumnije Kadriu. University of Prishtina.
- Hysi, Shyqyri (2006). "Kulte tradicionale shqiptare" [Albanian Traditional Cults]. Gjurmime Albanologjike - Folklor Dhe Etnologji (in Albanian) (36). Instituti Albanologjik i Prishtinës: 349–361.
- Koch, Harold (2015). "Patterns in the diffusion of nomenclature systems: Australian subsections in comparison to European days of the week". In Dag T.T. Haug (ed.). Historical Linguistics 2013: Selected papers from the 21st International Conference on Historical Linguistics, Oslo, 5-9 August 2013. Current Issues in Linguistic Theory. Vol. 334. With the assistance of: Eiríkur Kristjánsson. John Benjamins Publishing Company. ISBN 978-90-272-6818-1.
- Krasniqi, Shensi (2014). "Pilgrimages in mountains in Kosovo". Revista Santuários, Cultura, Arte, Romarias, Peregrinações, Paisagens e Pessoas. ISSN 2183-3184.
- Lambertz, Maximilian (1922). Albanische Märchen (und andere Texte zur albanischen Volkskunde). Wien: A. Hölder.
- Lambertz, Maximilian (1973). "Die Mythologie der Albaner". In Hans Wilhelm Haussig (ed.). Wörterbuch der Mythologie (in German). Vol. 2. pp. 455–509.
- Lurker, Manfred (2004). The Routledge dictionary of gods and goddesses, devils and demons. Routledge. ISBN 978-0-415-34018-2.
- Lurker, Manfred (2005). The Routledge Dictionary of Gods and Goddesses, Devils and Demons. Routledge, Taylor & Francis. ISBN 0-203-64351-8.
- Malcolm, Noel (2020). Rebels, Believers, Survivors: Studies in the History of the Albanians. Oxford University Press. ISBN 978-0192599223.
- Mallory, James P.; Adams, Douglas Q. (1997), Encyclopedia of Indo-European Culture, London: Routledge, ISBN 978-1-884964-98-5
- Muka, Ali (1984). "Vendi i zjarrit në banesën fshatare të shqipërisë së mesme" [Fireplace in the Peasant Dwelling of Central Albania]. Kultura Popullore (4). Qendra e Studimeve Albanologjike: 29–54.
- Murray-Aynsley, J. C. (1891). "Swastika". Ars Quatuor Coronatorum. IV.
- Olsen, Birgit Anette; Thorsø, Rasmus (2022). "Armenian". In Olander, Thomas (ed.). The Indo-European Language Family: A Phylogenetic Perspective. Cambridge University Press. pp. 202–222. doi:10.1017/9781108758666.012. ISBN 9781108758666.
- Orel, Vladimir (1998). Albanian etymological dictionary. Brill. ISBN 978-90-04-11024-3.
- Pipa, Arshi (1993). "Mythology of Albania". In Bonnefoy, Yves (ed.). American, African, and Old European mythologies. University of Chicago Press. ISBN 0-226-06457-3.
- Poghirc, Cicerone (1987). "Albanian Religion". In Mircea Eliade (ed.). The Encyclopedia of Religion. Vol. 1. New York: MacMillan Publishing Co. pp. 178–180.
- Qafleshi, Muharrem (2011). Opoja dhe Gora ndër shekuj [Opoja and Gora During Centuries]. Albanological Institute of Pristina. ISBN 978-9951-596-51-0.
- Sarao, K. T. S. (2021). Baku's Temple of Eternal Fire: Its Connections to Baba Nanak and the Udasi Sadhus. Bloomsbury. ISBN 9789354350986.
- Schirò, Giuseppe (1923). Canti tradizionali ed altri saggi delle colonie albanesi di Sicilia [Traditional Songs and other Essays from the Albanian Colonies of Sicily] (in Albanian and Italian). Stab. tip. L. Pierro.
- Sela, Jonida (2017). "Values and Traditions in Ritual Dances of All-Year Celebrations in Korça Region, Albania". International Conference "Education and Cultural Heritage". Vol. 1. Association of Heritage and Education. pp. 62–71.
- Stadtmüller, Georg (1954). "Altheidnischer Volksglaube und Christianisierung in Albanien". Orientalia Christiana Periodica (in German). XX. Pontificium Institutum Orientalium Studiorum: 211–246.
- Steiner-Karafili, Enit (2010). "Byron and the Albanians: Unearthing Identities". Studia Albanica (2): 137–147. ISSN 0585-5047.
- Stipčević, Aleksandar (2009). "Elementët parahistorike në besimet e arbëreshëve të Zarës". AKTET (in Albanian): 505–509. ISSN 2073-2244.
- Tagliavini, Carlo (1963). Storia di parole pagane e cristiane attraverso i tempi. Brescia: Morcelliana.
- Tirta, Mark (2004). Petrit Bezhani (ed.). Mitologjia ndër shqiptarë (in Albanian). Tirana: Mësonjëtorja. ISBN 99927-938-9-9.
- Treimer, Karl (1971). "Zur Rückerschliessung der illyrischen Götterwelt und ihre Bedeutung für die südslawische Philologie". In Henrik Barić (ed.). Arhiv za Arbanasku starinu, jezik i etnologiju. Vol. I. R. Trofenik. pp. 27–33.
- Useini, Rini (2024). "Ethnology as a Vital Manifestation, (Folk Rites and Practices)". Philosophica. 11 (22–23). University of Tetova: 160–166. doi:10.62792/ut.philosophica.v11.i22-23.p2732. ISSN 2671-3020.
- West, Morris L. (2007). Indo-European Poetry and Myth. Oxford University Press. ISBN 978-0199280759.
- Wheeler, G. Post (1936). Albanian Wonder Tales. New York: The Junior Literary Guild and Doubleday, Doran and Company, Inc. pp. 247–280.
- Xhemaj, Ukë (1983). "Zjarri në besimet popullore shqiptare" [The Fire in Albanian Folk Beliefs]. In Mark Krasniqi, Ukë Xhemaj (ed.). Trashëgimia dhe tranformimi i kulturës popullore: materiala nga sesioni shkencor, mbajtur në Prishtinë më 7-8 shtator 1979. Albanological Institute of Prishtina. pp. 104–121.
- Yochalas, Titos (1980). Το Ελληνο-Αλβανικόν Λεξικόν του Μάρκου Μπότσαρη [The Greek-Albanian Dictionary of Markos Botsaris]. Academy of Greece.
