= Nëna e Vatrës =

Albanian mythological figure of hearth

Nëna e Vatrës or Nana e Votrës ("The Mother of the Hearth") is an Albanian mythological figure, the protector of the hearth (Albanian: vatër), associated with the household fire worship, the cult of the ancestor and family life. She is sometimes regarded as a goddess (hyjni e zjarrit të vatrës "deity of the hearth fire") in Albanian traditions.

== Names and etymology ==
Nëna e Vatrës is a mythological figure of the hearth fire commonly found in the folk beliefs of the Albanians, thus there are many dialectal variations, singular or plural: Nëna e Vatrës/Nana e Votrës, E Ëma e Vatrës/E Ama e Votrës, Mëma e Vatrës/Mama e Vatrës, Shtriga e Vatrës/Votrës, Plaka e Vatrës/Votrës, Mëmat e Vatrës/Mamat e Votrës, Xhuxhet e Vatrës etc. The first element nënë/nanë or ëmë/amë, means "mother"; while the last element vatër/votër, means "hearth", "fireplace", and is related to the Avestan atar, "fire".

== Folk beliefs ==
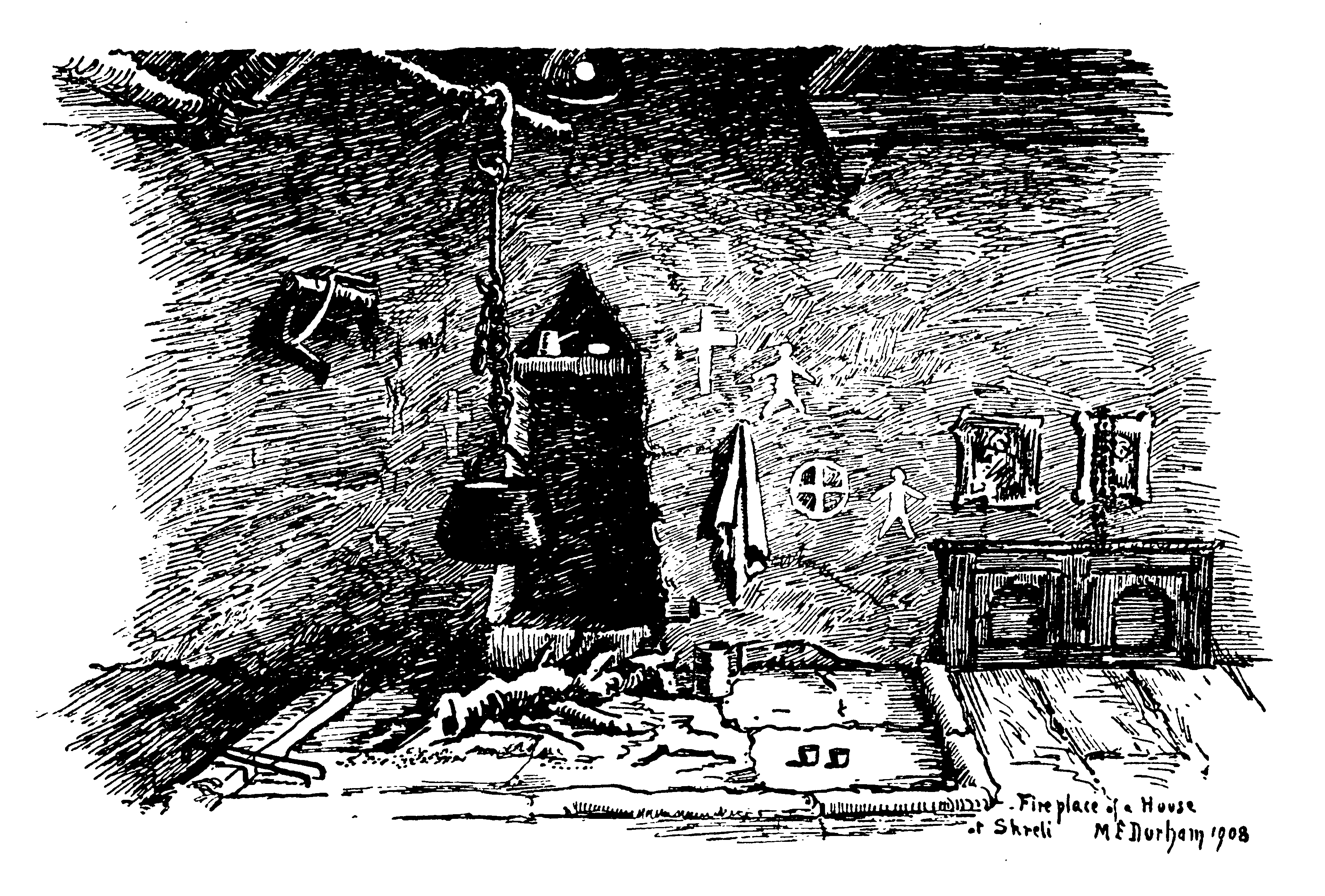
Fireplace (votër) of a house of Shkreli, northern Albania, drawn by Edith Durham in 1909.

In Albanian folk beliefs, Nëna e Vatrës is the protector of the vatër, the domestic fireplace. It is said that the fireplace should be cleaned in the evening. If it is left uncleaned, Nëna e Vatrës becomes angry. The family members should behave respectfully towards her. At feasts, people used to practice sacrificial offerings to the deity throwing some of the food they prepared into the fire and around the hearth.

Nëna e Vatrës bears similarities to Greek Hestia and Roman Vesta. To the Greek and Roman goddesses well-defined public places of worship were dedicated, while in the Albanian tradition the place of worship of Nëna e Vatrës is the hearth of every house.

== See also ==
- Enji (deity) – Albanian fire god and cult
- I Verbti – Albanian god of fire and wind or thunderstorms
- Prende – Albanian dawn goddess, goddess love, beauty, fertility and health
- Fatia – Albanian mythological figure
- Ora (mythology) – Albanian mythological figure of Fate
- Vitore – Albanian domestic deity
- Gabija – Spirit of the fire in Lithuanian mythology
- Nymphaion (fire sanctuary)

== Sources ==
=== Bibliography ===
- Gjoni, Irena (2012). Marrëdhënie të miteve dhe kulteve të bregdetit të Jonit me areale të tjera mitike (PhD) (in Albanian). Tirana: University of Tirana, Faculty of History and Philology.
- Mallory, James P.; Adams, Douglas Q., eds. (1997), Encyclopedia of Indo-European Culture, London: Routledge, ISBN 978-1-884964-98-5, (EIEC)
- Monaghan, Patricia (1997). The New Book of Goddesses & Heroines. Llewellyn Publications. p. 324. ISBN 9781567184655.
- Poghirc, Cicerone (1987). "Albanian Religion". In Mircea Eliade (ed.). The Encyclopedia of Religion. Vol. 1. New York: MacMillan Publishing Co. pp. 178–180.
- Tirta, Mark (2004). Petrit Bezhani (ed.). Mitologjia ndër shqiptarë (in Albanian). Tirana: Mësonjëtorja. ISBN 99927-938-9-9.
