= Deities and fairies of fate in Slavic mythology =

Rozhanitsy
- fate, destiny, luck
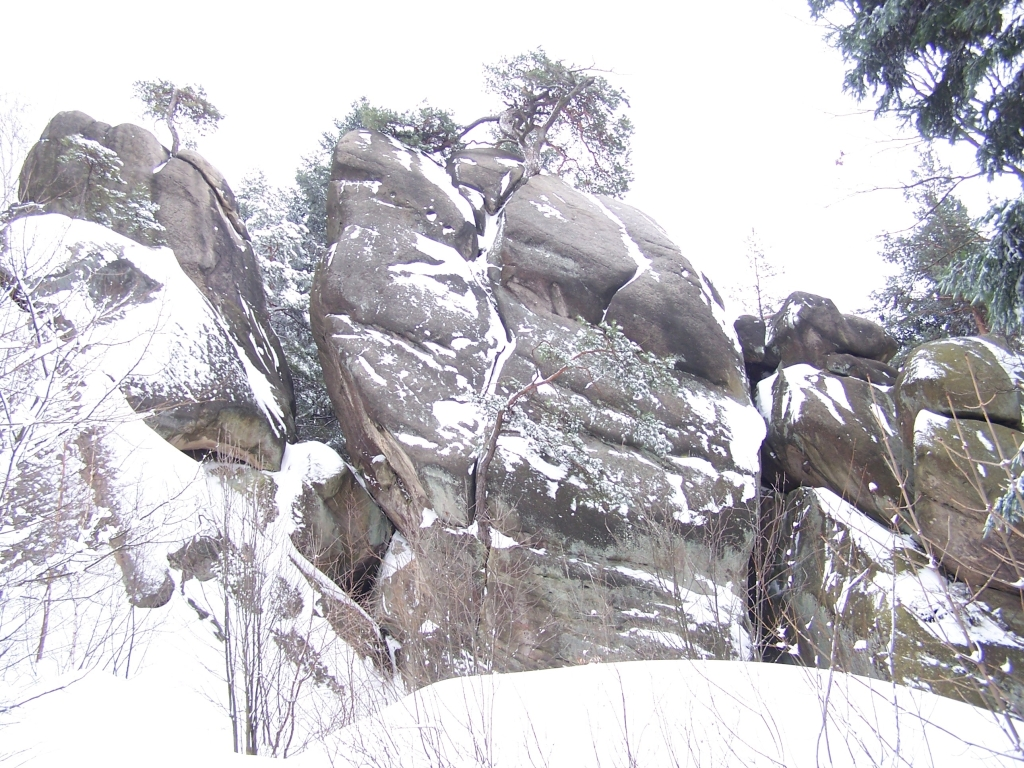
- Prządki nature reserve, Poland. The rodzanice (rozhanitsy) are frequently linked to such natural sites featuring three "sister" stone formations, said to be petrified weavers of fate.
- Other names: narecnitsy, sudzhenitsy
- Artifacts: Spindle, golden thread
- Consort: Rod

Equivalents
- Albanian: Ora, Fatia
- Greek: Moirai
- Roman: Parcae
- Celtic: Brigid
- Baltic: Laima

Rozhanitsy, narecnitsy, and sudzhenitsy are invisible spirits or deities of fate in the pre-Christian belief of the Slavs. They are related to pregnancy, motherhood, marriage and female ancestors, and are often referenced together with Rod. They are usually mentioned as three together, but sometimes up to 9 together, of whom one was a "queen" or singular. They are related to Dola, but it is not known on what terms. In Poland they were worshipped as zorze (auroras).

== Names and meaning ==
In different regions of the Slavs and languages they were named differently:

- Croatian: rođenice, rojenice, roženice, sudice, suđenice, sujenice
- Slovene: rojenice, sudice, sojenice, sujenice
- Bulgarian: sudženici, narŭčnici, orisnici ("орисници"), urisnici, uresici
- Czech and Slovak: sudičky
- Polish: rodzanice, narecznice, sudiczki
- Serbian: suđaje, suđenice, rođenice, narečnici
- Old East Slavic, Russian: rožanice, udĕlnicy
- Ukrainian: rožanyci

The terms rodzanica, rodjenica or rojenica come from the word roditi ("giving birth") and literally mean "[female] birth attendant".

The terms sudiczka, sudica, or sojenica come from the word sud ("judgment", "judge", "court") and literally mean "[female] judge".

The terms narecznica, nerechnitsa, narucnica mean "[female] name-giver".

The term udelnica means "[female] granter" or "partitioner".

The Bulgarian terms orisnici, urisnici, uresici come from the Greek word όρίζοντες (orizontes "establish") and mean "[female] establisher”.

Among the Eastern Slavs, the personification of good fortune was also known as Dolya, whose name means "division", "participation", while bad luck was personified as its opposite, Nedolya. Among Serbs and Croats, on the other hand, personified good fortune was known as Sreća, meaning simply "luck".

In some regions of Poland, the functions of rozhanitsy were fulfilled by other figures: boginki in Lesser Poland, kraśniki in Pomerania. In The Catalogue Of Rudolph's Magic, written by Edward Karvot, who wrote the information collected by Brother Rudolf about the customs of pagan Western Slavs, we read that the Slavs "make sacrifices to their three sisters, which the pagans call Clotho, Lachesis and Atropos, to lend them wealth." Rudolph, probably not knowing the language of the Slavs, gave rozhanitsy the names of Moirai, which he knew from Greek mythology, and who perform the same functions as the rozhanitsy.

After Christianization, the rozhanitsy were replaced by the Mothers of God or by female saints. In Russian charms for protection of adolescent boys, Parascheva, Anastasia, and Barbara were frequently called upon, while in Bulgarian folklore the Mother of God, Parascheva and Anastasia were more commonly invoked. Angels or even Christ Himself could also assume the functions of rozhanitsy.

== Sources ==
The 11th-century Word of St. Gregory the Theologian about how pagans bowed to idols is the first source mentioning rozhanitsy:

Also, this word reached the Slavs, and they began to offer sacrifices to Rod and the Rozhanitsy before Perun, their god. And earlier, they offered sacrifices to vampires [upyrí] and bereginyas [water-sprites?]. But even now, on the outskirts, they pray to him, the cursed god Perun, and to Khors and Mokosh, and to the vilas - they do this in secret.

The Russian Word of a certain Christ-lover:

...we also mix some pure prayers with cursed idolatrous offerings [when] others, in addition to the "lawful table", set out tables and dishes dedicated to Rod and the Rozhanitsy, offending God.

The cult of rozhanitsy was still popular in 16th-century Rus', as evidenced by penance given during confession by Orthodox priests described in the penitentiaries of Saint Sabbas of Storozhi:

A clergyman should ask if she has mixed pagan beliefs with Christian ones, and if she has prayed to the vilas, or if she has eaten and consumed alcohol in honor of Rod and the Rozhanitsy and different gods such as Perun, Khors, and Mokosh: three years of fasting with prostrations as penance.

Izmail Sreznevsky collected the following sources in his Materials for the Old Russian dictionary:

Pledging sacrifice to rozhanitsy - filling a mug to the demon

pledging Bod (or Rod and rozhanitsy) a sacrifice and preparing a mixed drink for rozhanitsy (devils)

with the children cut their first hair and the women boil groat for rozhanitsy

if to rozhanitsy they are eating bread and cheese and honey strictly forbidden in one place, says (Isaiah): woe to those who drink and eat in honor of rozhanitsy

who is worshipper of kolach, or worshipper of rozhanitsy

Narecnitsy often appear in various South Slavic legends and epics. One of these is the epic of Prince Marko:

Vreme bilo tokmo na polnoke, na polnoke, vreme glua doba; što mu došle do tri narečnici, na deteto kŭsmet da narečat;... Vala Bogu za čudo golemo, što se reklo ot tri narečnici, što se reklo, i se izvŭršilo.	It was exactly midnight, at midnight, at a deaf time; when three narecnitsy came to him, the child's destiny was outlined;... Praise God for a great miracle, what was said from the three narecnitsy, what was said was fulfilled.

The first to record the cult of auroras was the ethnographer Zorian Dołęga-Chodakowski. He wrote about it in his work About Slavdom before Christianity:

You have to go and descend under the villager's thatch in different distant sides, you have to hurry to his feasts, games and various adventures. There, in the smoke rising above their heads, old rituals still roam, old songs chant and the names of forgotten gods are spoken among the dances of the people. In this bitter darkness you can see three moons shining, three virgin auroras, seven wagon stars (Big Dipper).

Polish literature historian Stefan Vrtel-Wierczyński in Medieval Polish secular poetry wrote a spell discovered by Brückner:

Zarze, zarzyce, trzy siestrzyce. Poszła Matka Boża po morzu, zbirając złote pianki; Potkał ją święty Jan: A gdzie idziesz matuchno? Idę synaczka swego leczyć.	Auroras, auroras, three sisters. Mother of God went on the see, collecting golden foams Saint John met her: Where are you going, mother? I'm going to heal my son.

The Polish folklorist Stanisław Czernik in his book Trzy zorze dziewicze: wśród zamawiań i zaklęć (Three virgin auroras: among orders and spells) cites the following spell:

Zorzyczki, zorzyczki, trzy was jest jedna porankowa, druga południowa, trzecia wieczorowa. Weźcie od mego dziecka płaczenie, oddajcie mu spanie.	Little auroras, little auroras, there are three of you one morning, second midday third evening. Take a cry from my child, give him sleep back.

The Wisła geographical and ethnographic monthly gives the following spell over a baby crying at night, that is spell for three days during sunset, and a prayer for a good husband:

Zorze, zorze, zorznice Odbierzcie od naszego dziecka płacznice	Auroras, auroras, auroras Take away crying from our child

Zorze, zorzeczeńki! Wszystkieśta moje siostruczeńki! Siadajta na konia wronego I jedźta po towarzysza mojego. Żeby on nie mógł beze mnie ni spać, ni jeść, ni siadać, ni gadać. Żeby ja mu się spodobała we stanie, w robocie, w ochocie. Żeby ja była wdzięczna i przyjemna Bogu i ludziom, i temu towarzyszowi mojemu.	Auroras, little auroras! You all are my little sisters! Sit on a black horse And go for my companion. So that he could not without me neither sleep, nor eat, nor sit, nor speak. So that he likes me in stand, in work, in desire So that I would be grateful and pleasing to God and people, and to my companion.

== Appearance ==
In the folklore of the Southern Slavs, rozhanitsy are described as beautiful girls or as good-natured elderly women. Sometimes they are also represented as three women of different ages: a girl, an adult woman and an elderly woman. Southern Slavs described them as beautiful figures with white, round cheeks. They were said to be dressed in white clothes, to have a white cap (mobcap) on their heads and to have silver and gold jewelry. In their hands they were said to hold burning candles through which their silhouettes were easily visible in the moonlight.

Czech sources described them as white-dressed virgins or old women. They were said to be tall and transparent, their cheeks pale, their eyes apt to sparkle and charm people and their hair decorated with precious stones. Like the southern Slavs, they were said to wear white bonnets or veils.

== Functions and cult ==
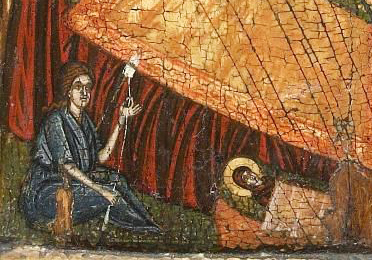
Spinner turns the thread of life at the cradle of the Mother of God. Fragment of the "Nativity" icon, Ukraine, 16th century.

They were said to look after pregnant women, and after giving birth to a child, they determined his fate for the rest of his life. The rozhanitsy appeared at midnight three days after the birth of the child, at his cradle, when they were supposed to foretell the child's good or bad fate for life. After determining the fate of the child, it was saved as an indelible mark on the forehead. The rozhanitsy's opinions on the future of the child were often contradictory, and the final, oldest parent makes the final decision. The first, youngest rozhanitsa spins, the second measures and the third cuts off the thread of life – the longer the thread, the longer life will be. Among southern Slavs, rozhanitsy were sometimes distinguished from sudzhenitsy, who were said to appear before death and during important moments in life. Rozhanitsy were sometimes called upon to protect the family from illness.

According to Procopius, Slavs did not believe in destiny:

For they believe that one god, the maker of lightning, is alone lord of all things, and they sacrifice to him cattle and all other victims; but as for fate, they neither know it nor do they in any wise admit that it has any power among men, but whenever death stands close before them, either stricken with sickness or beginning a war, they make a promise that, if they escape, they will straightway make a sacrifice to the god in return for their life; and if they escape, they sacrifice just what they have promised, and consider that their safety has been bought with this same sacrifice.

— Procopius

According to sources, a trapezoidal table with bread, honey, cheese and groat (kutia) was prepared in honor of the rozhanitsy, sometimes the meal was left in the shrines. The hair cut during a child's first haircut was also sacrificed to the rozhanitsy. Slovenes and Croats used to put candles, wine, bread and salt in the room where the woman lies the day after delivery. Failure to do so threatened that rozhanitsy would determine a child's bad fortune. Slovenians living in Istria laid bread under the boulders next to the caves in which rozhanitsy were said to live, and in Bulgaria suppers were prepared for them. In Czechia, a table was prepared at which white clothes and chairs were waiting for the rozhanitsy along with a chair on which bread, salt and butter were laid, and sometimes cheese and beer. One of Rod and the rozhanitsy's holidays was said to be December 26, which after Christianization was replaced by the Orthodox Church with the Feast of the Mother of God.

The rozhanitsy were said to live at the end of the world in the palace of the Sun, which could connect them to the solar deity.

In many European religions, there are three female figures foretelling the child's future, which indicates the Indo-European origin of the rozhanitsy:

- Roman: Parcae
- Greek: Moirai
- Albanian: Ora or Fatia
- Norse: Norns
- Celtic: Brigid in three persons or three Matres
- Baltic: Laima, who sometimes appeared in three forms

== Goddess Rozhanitsa ==
Old Russian sources also mention Rozhanitsa as a single person, usually in the pair of Rod and Rodzanica. An example of such a source is the 12th-century chronicle Gesta regum Anglorum, which describes the cult of Svetovid among the Slavs of the Elbe, comparing him to the Roman Fortuna and Greek Týchē. The 13th-century Russian translation of this chronicle translates Fortuna as Rozhanitsa (Рожданица). Another example could be the Word about how pagans bowed to idols: "Artemis and Artemisa called Rod and Roshanitsa". In such a situation, Rozhanitsa could be interpreted as a Mother Goddess – the goddess of fertility and motherhood. According to mythologists, the triple deities of fate are the hypostasis of the ancient goddess of fate. Protogermanic Urðr and early Greek Clotho are thought to be such goddesses. A similar process probably took place among the Slavs, and in that situation Dolya could be the original goddess of fate.

Boris Rybakov linked Rozhanitsa with Lada, claiming that Lada was Rod's partner and also the first rozhanitsa.

== In popular culture ==
- Percival Schuttenbach – Rodzanice (Strzyga album)

== See also ==
- Ursitory
- Laume

== Bibliography ==
- Szyjewski, Andrzej (2003). Religia Słowian. Wydawn. WAM. ISBN 83-7318-205-5.
- Gieysztor, Aleksander (2006). Mitologia Słowian. Wydawn. Uniwersytetu Warszawskiego. ISBN 83-235-0234-X.
- Strzelczyk, Jerzy (2007). Mity, podania i wierzenia dawnych Słowian. Rebis. ISBN 978-83-7301-973-7.
- Brückner, Aleksander (1985). Mitologia słowiańska. Państwowe Wydawnictwo Naukowe. ISBN 8301062452.
- Figes, Orlando (2018). Natasha's Dance: A Cultural History of Russia. Penguin Books Limited. ISBN 978-0141989594.
- Dołęga-Chodakowski, Zorian; Maślanka, Julian (1967). O Sławiańszczyźnie przed chrześcijaństwem oraz inne pisma i listy.
- Vrtel-Wierczyński, Stefan (1923). Średniowieczna poezja polska świecka.
- Czernik, Stanisław (1985). Trzy zorze dziewicze: wśród zamawiań i zaklęć. Wydawn. Łódzkie. ISBN 8321804225.
- Grzegorzewic, Ziemisław (2016). O Bogach i ludziach. Praktyka i teoria Rodzimowierstwa Słowiańskiego. Olsztyn. ISBN 9788394018085.
- Goscilo, Helena; Holmgren, Beth (1996). Russia--women--culture. Indiana University Press. ISBN 0253210445.
- Mačuda, Jiří (2012). Rodnověřské obřady a ruská lidová kultura.
- Podgórscy, Barbara i Adam (2005). Wielka Księga Demonów Polskich – leksykon i antologia demonologii ludowej. Wydawn. KOS. ISBN 83-89375-40-0.
- Profantowa, Nadia (2004). Encyklopedie slovanských bohů a mýtů. Libri. ISBN 8072772198.
