= Shtojzovalle =

Albanian mythological creature

In Albanian mythology, the shtojzovalle, also known as shtojzorreshta, shtozote is a small creature with supernatural powers and of extraordinary beauty. They are invisible woodland creatures, which can be seen by humans only on rare occasions and are fond of song and dance.

== Name ==
The term shtojzovalle derives from the Albanian words shtoj (English: add), zot (English: god, deity) and valle (English: dance), with the term meaning in English "may God give increase to their dance" or "multiply, God, their choirs". The name shtojzovalle is a product of Pagan and Christian religious syncretism. The alternative term shtojzorreshta means "may God give increase to their rows" in English.

== Traits ==
The shtojzovalles are small male and female creatures of extraordinary beauty. They live in forests and pastures and spend their time singing and dancing. They have the ability to fly and at night they spin the thread of human existence. They are invisible to humans and a human can see them only if they lift an invisible veil in front of their eyes. Occasionally humans and shtojzovalles are married, but a human can keep a shtojzovalle maiden only if he gives her his clothes to wear. If a human builds their house on lands inhabited by shtojzovalles, the house will be haunted by shtojzovalles shaking heavy iron chains. When people go for a walk and step on a shtojzovalle they may get devoured by it.

== Religious syncretism ==
Albanian Christians and especially the Catholics of northern Albania and Malësia have attributed several Christian characteristics to the shtojzovalles. According to these traditions when Archangel Michael fought against Satan the angels who remained neutral became the shtojzovalles. The shtojzovalles weep in repentance for their neutrality and if their tears fall on a human he will die. The Albanian phrase i ka rënë pika (English: "a drop fell upon him"), metaphorically means that someone died and the phrase is derived from this belief.

== See also ==
- Albanian mythology
- Shurdhi
- Drangue
- Zana e malit
