= Bardha =

Albanian mythological creature

A bardha (Albanian pronunciation: [baɾða], English: 'the white one') is an Albanian mythological figure, appearing either as a zana (nymph) or as an ora (Fate goddess) associated with good luck. The plural form is bardhat.

== Folk beliefs ==
Bardhat are described as pale, nebulous figures, or as apparitions of women in white that live both on misty mountains and in the underworld. They are sometimes considered mountain or nature spirits.

They are generally indifferent to humans, but will harm people if offended, and can paralyze or make mute a person who inadvertently steps on them. It is also said that they cause the rider of a horse to fall off if the horse steps on them. In order to appease them, especially after an accident, one would leave sugar, cakes, or honey on the ground at the site where it happened and say nice things about the bardha.

The inhabitants of the Dukagjini Mountains believed that three types of Ora (Fate goddesses) existed: "e Bardha (The White One) distributes good luck and wishes humans well, e Verdha (The Yellow One) distributes bad luck and casts evil spells, and e Zeza (The Black One) who decides death".

According to old folklore that thinks of them as nymph-like creatures, a bardha is similar to zana e malit.

== Bibliography ==
- Doja, Albert (2005). "Mythology and Destiny" (PDF). Anthropos. 100 (2): 449–462. doi:10.5771/0257-9774-2005-2-449. JSTOR 40466549.
- Elsie, Robert (2001). A Dictionary of Albanian Religion, Mythology and Folk Culture. London: Hurst & Company. ISBN 1-85065-570-7. Archived from the original on 25 January 2022.
- Lurker, Manfred (2004). The Routledge dictionary of gods and goddesses, devils and demons. Routledge. p. 207. ISBN 978-04-15340-18-2.
