= Vitore =

Albanian domestic deity

The cult of the household serpent is implemented in the Albanian traditional art: the snake silouhette commonly appears carved on the walls and doors of Albanian houses for good fortune and to ward off the evil eye.

The Vitore (Albanian definite form: Vitorja, also Gjarpni i Votrës, Gjarpni i Shtëpisë, Bolla e Shtëpisë or Ora e Shtëpisë) is a household divine serpent (gjarpër or bollë) in Albanian mythology and folklore, associated with human destiny, good fortune and the souls of the ancestors. In folk beliefs the household serpent is strongly related to the cult of the hearth (vatër) and it is especially considered the guardian of the family and the house.

== Etymology ==
The name Vitore has been analyzed as descendant from the Albanian vejtare > vektare > vek/vegj, "loom", thus meaning "a spinster, a woman who spins", related to the weaving of fate.

The Albanian terms gjarpën/gjarpër (def.: gjarp(ë)ni/gjarp(ë)ri) and bollë (def.: bolla) mean 'serpent, snake', vatër (def.: vatra) means 'hearth' and shtëpi/shpi (def.: shtëpia/shpia) means 'house'.

== Beliefs ==
The serpent is an animal totem of the Albanians, especially in the north. The belief of the personification of the souls of the ancestors in household serpents has been handed down from prehistoric times. The widespread cult of the serpent among Albanians is related to Illyrian beliefs.

Vitorja is usually described as a small, colourful and benign golden horned serpent. However, in some traditions Vitorja is described also as an old woman, a mythological figure similar to Nëna e Vatrës. Vitorja is also identified with Fatia in southern folklore and Ora in central and northern folklore.

As a serpent, when Vitorja dwell in the walls of a house, it is believed to bring good luck, so the inhabitants treat it with much respect. Its hissing announces important events to the family. The death of the household serpent brings bad luck and even the extinction of the family. The household serpent is said to walk around the house marking the territory it guards.

== Bibliography ==
- Berishaj, Martin (2004). Skrita moč bese: Ženske v imaginariju albanskega tradicionalizma. Dodatek: Skenderbegov kanon (in Slovenian). Založba ZRC. ISBN 9789616500746.
- Doja, Albert (2005). "Mythology and Destiny" (PDF). Anthropos. 100 (2): 449–462. doi:10.5771/0257-9774-2005-2-449. JSTOR 40466549. S2CID 115147696.
- Doli, Flamur (2009). "Decoration from the house snake cult belief system, as evidenced in Kosovan vernacular architecture". Thesis Kosova (1): 127–144.
- Elsie, Robert (2001). A Dictionary of Albanian Religion, Mythology and Folk Culture. London: Hurst & Company. ISBN 1-85065-570-7.
- Galaty, Michael; Lafe, Ols; Lee, Wayne; Tafilica, Zamir (2013). Light and Shadow: Isolation and Interaction in the Shala Valley of Northern Albania. The Cotsen Institute of Archaeology Press. ISBN 978-1931745710.
- Poghirc, Cicerone (1987). "Albanian Religion". In Mircea Eliade (ed.). The Encyclopedia of Religion. Vol. 1. New York: MacMillan Publishing Co. pp. 178–180.
- Sinani, Shaban (2010). "Rikodifikimi i shenjës në romanin "Dranja". Një vështrim Antropologjik". In Bardhyl Demiraj (ed.). Wir sind die Deinen: Studien zur albanischen Sprache, Literatur und Kulturgeschichte, dem Gedenken an Martin Camaj (1925–1992) gewidmet. Otto Harrassowitz Verlag. pp. 101–112. ISBN 9783447062213.
- Stipčević, Aleksandar (2009). "Elementët parahistorike në besimet e arbëreshëve të Zarës". AKTET (in Albanian): 505–509. ISSN 2073-2244.
- Tirta, Mark (2004). Petrit Bezhani (ed.). Mitologjia ndër shqiptarë (in Albanian). Tirana: Mësonjëtorja. ISBN 99927-938-9-9.
