= Fatia =

Albanian mythological figure

The fatia (Albanian fatí, definite form: fatía, pl.: fatí/të; English: fate) is an Albanian mythological figure associated with human destiny. Often depicted as three female deities, the essential function of the fatí is to maintain the order of the universe and to enforce its laws.

Along with the mira, they can be found in the folk beliefs of Tosk Albanians. Albanian mythological figures related to fate and destiny can also be found in the folk beliefs of Gheg Albanians with the name of ora and zana.

== Appearance ==
The fatí are visualized as riding on butterflies. On the third day after a child has been born, three Fatits approach the baby's cradle and determine that child's fate. They are also known as Miren, possibly from the Greek Moirai.

== See also ==
- Ora
- Bardha
- Zana e malit
- Deities and fairies of fate in Slavic mythology
- Laume (Baltic entities of fate)
- Ursitoare
- Ursitory

== Sources ==
=== Bibliography ===
- Doja, Albert (2005). "Mythology and Destiny" (PDF). Anthropos. 100 (2): 449–462. JSTOR 40466549.
- Lurker, Manfred (2005). The Routledge Dictionary of Gods and Goddesses, Devils and Demons. Routledge, Taylor & Francis. ISBN 0-203-64351-8.
- West, Morris L. (2007). Indo-European Poetry and Myth. Oxford University Press. ISBN 978-0199280759.
