= Ora (mythology) =

Albanian mythological figure of Fate

The Ora (Albanian: orë, definite form: ora, pl.: orë/t) is an Albanian mythological figure that every human possesses from birth, associated with human destiny and fate. The essential function of the ora is to maintain the order of the universe and to enforce its laws.

The ora is regarded as a kind of personal goddess belonging to only one individual. The ora organize the aspect of all humankind by attending the birth of every human and weaving his future. The ora that belongs to the house is often imagined as a serpent.

The Northern Albanian Ora, along with the Zana, can be found within the folk beliefs and oral epics of the Gheg Albanians. Folk beliefs of the Southern Tosk Albanians reveal similar Albanian mythological figures of fate and destiny, the Mira and Fatia.

== Geographic location of the Ora ==
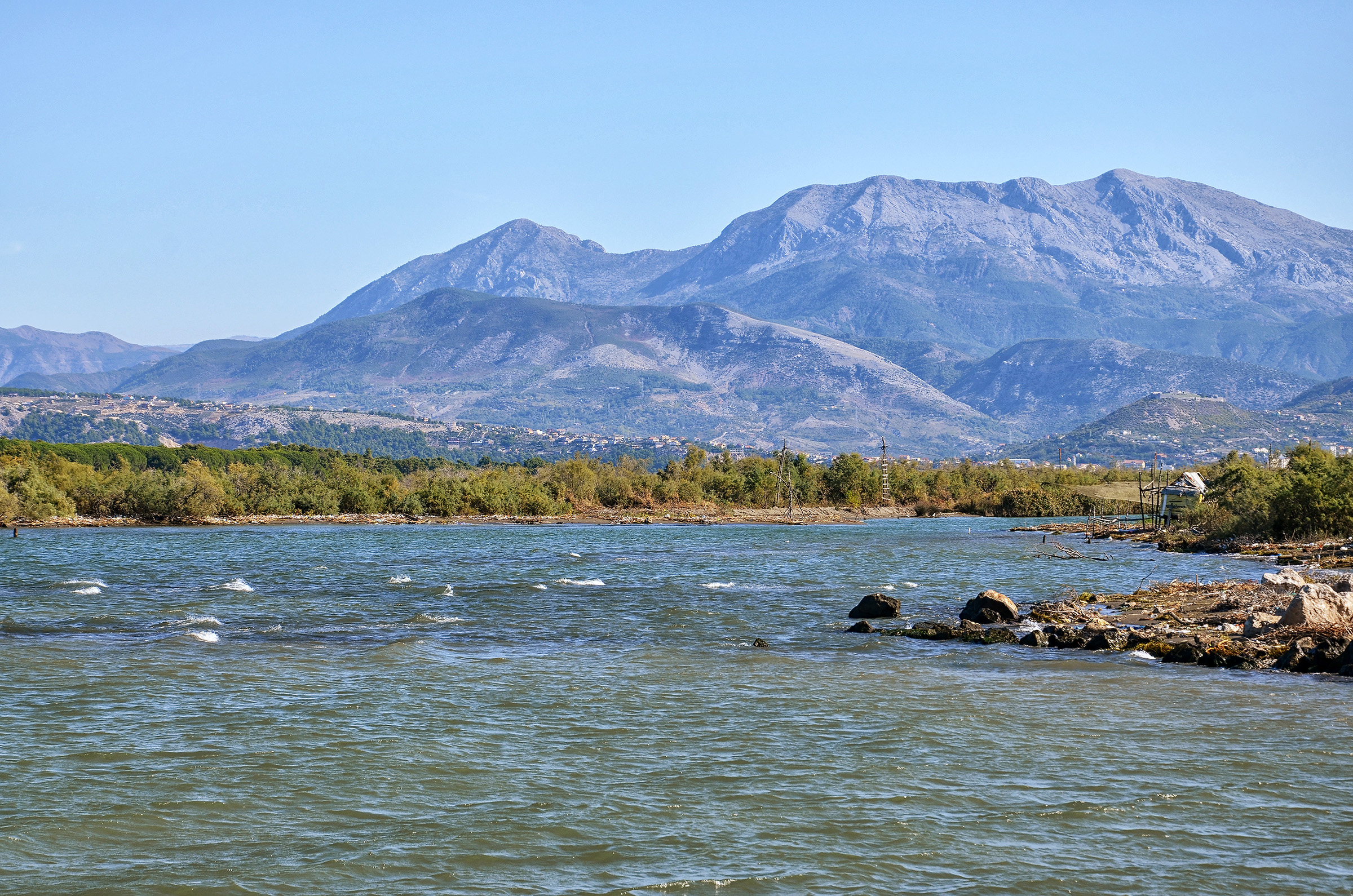
The Drin estuary in the Kunë-Vaine-Tale Nature Park in Albania

The Ora reside towards the north of the Drin River in Northern Albania. Within Central Albania it was believed that the Ora were present everywhere, “listening to people’s blessings and curses, which they would then aim to quickly fulfil”. Outside of Central Albania Oras live in forests and mountains, residing in streams, lakes, and caves. Baron Franz Nopcsa related the term ‘Ora’ to the ancient Greek Oreads, “nymphs of the mountains”.

Extract from Songs of the Frontier Warriors (Mujo’s Ora’s), translated by Robert Elsie –

As Slavic Warrior Paji Harambashi searches for Mujo within the mountain ranges, he encounters three snow-white Oras – Mujo’s protectors.

“And turning, set off for the high mountain meadows, But nowhere upon them was he to find Mujo. Anger and rage of the shkja took possession. There in the moonlight at the edge of a fountain Did he encounter the three snow-white oras. In the light of the moon did they seem to be playing.”

— "Mujo's Ora's", Songs of the Frontier Warriors.

== Appearance ==
Within Albanian folklore and poetry, the Ora is a protective spirit that every human possesses from birth. The Ora's appearance alters according to the personality and attributes of the human – “a white Ora for the brave and industrious, or a black Ora for the lazy or cowardly.”

=== The Fates ===
In Northern Albania, the Oras are represented – similarly to the Southern Albanian Fatia – as a group of three mythological goddesses who gather in the night to perform the task of “determining the child’s fate at birth” and distribute their favours upon the child. The inhabitants of the Dukagjini Mountains believed that three types of Fates existed: “e Bardha (The White One) distributes good luck and wishes humans well, e Verdha (The Yellow One) distributes bad luck and casts evil spells, and e Zeza (The Black One) who decides death”.

=== Ability to Transform ===
Within Albanian folklore and poetry, Ora had the ability to take any form they pleased, including “birds, beasts, women, or serpents.”

==== Serpent form ====
In Northern Albania, Oras “often appear as serpents.” – similarly to the Southern Albanian deity Vitore. Both the Ora and Vitore are “widely represented as a serpent with golden horns who brings gold.” Albanian stories describe beliefs associated with the protective serpent Oras. The mythological cycle of the ‘deeds of Muyi’ reveal the Ora’s ability to provide the hero with supernatural powers and healing while in the form of a serpent.

From Albanian literature translated by Robert Elsie -

“Can you see that Ora, standing at my bedside?

She holds vigil over me day and night.

This serpent slithers over my wounds to heal them.

God bestowed it upon me to come to my assistance.“

— Robert Elsie

== Attributes ==
Within Albanian folklore it was believed every person was assigned an Ora at birth, for there were “as many Ora as there were humans”. Ora travel with their person and provide protection. The Ora – similar to the ancient Greek Moirai – attend the birth of each child, determining their destiny while providing their blessings upon the child; “organising the appearance of humankind”.

=== Fate and Destiny ===
With the birth of each child many Oras gather in the night towards the cliffs to decide upon the qualities that child would receive. Albert Doja refers to the studies of Maximilian Lambertz, revealing that the faces of the Oras change depending on the degree of happiness they bestow upon the newborn child. “Should an Ora howl at a person, the threads of their fate would be cut”. Once an Ora has been assigned to a newborn its appearance would change based on the qualities of the child; a “white Ora for the brave, or a black Ora for the cowardly”.

== References of the Ora in Folklore and Epic Poetry ==
As discussed by Robert Elsie; tales and legends within Albanian folklore and poetry reveal the fundamental theme of the struggle between good and evil, “a reflection of social values as we perceive them”(Elsie, 2015). “Traditionally sung in the far north of Albania”, Albanian oral literature has preserved many archaic elements, revealing traces of Greco-Roman mythology within, including the mythical Ora.

=== Songs of the Frontier Warriors ===
Songs of the Frontier Warriors – described by Robert Elsie as one of “the best-known cycles of Albanian epic verse.” The earliest written account of the epic was in Northern Albania in the early twentieth century, by Franciscan priests located in the mountains. (Osborn, 2015, p. 14)

Revealed are the tales and adventures of warrior Gjeto Basho Mujo and his brother Sokol as they travel through Albania. A pronounced mythological component to the text is revealed, as the brothers engage with mystical creatures that help them throughout their journey – one of those creatures being the Ora.

==== Mujo's Oras ====
Slavic warrior Paji Harambashi’s encounters three white oras, mystical creatures in the mountains “who revel and frolic” as he searches for Mujo. An Ora is made a victim by Paji as he clenches and crushes its arm. The three Ora then seek the help of Mujo to seek revenge on Paji.

Extract from Songs of the Frontier Warriors (Mujo’s Ora’s), translated by Robert Elsie -

“Oh oras, to whom do you render assistance?”

One then strolled near him and spoke to him, saying:

“The oras we are of the great earthly hero,

We give our aid to Gjeto Basho Mujo!”

Great was the rage that the shkja felt for Mujo!

Seizing the arm of one of the oras,

He clenched it and squeezed it and crushed it to pieces.”

— "Mujo's Ora's", Songs of the Frontier Warriors.

==== The Marriage of Halili ====
Mujo’s brother Halili sets out to search for the only one he wishes to marry, Tanusha - the daughter of the King in the Realm of the Christians. On his journey he encounters an Ora who assists him and guides him towards Tanusha.

Extract from Songs of the Frontier Warriors (The Marriage of Halili), translated by Robert Elsie –

“I’m on my way to the Realm of the Christians,

There to encounter one Vukë Harambashi.”

The mountain ora then burst into laughter,

The young man himself was perplexed and did wonder

What kind of being was standing before him.

The ora turned now and began to inform him, …

Vukë Harambashi you’ll never encounter

For the Realm of the Christians he’s long since departed,

But come over here, young man, in my direction…”

— "The Marriage of Halili", Songs of the Frontier Warriors.

==== Mujo and Behuri ====
On his journey, Mujo meets an Ora who tells him he must slay Slavic warrior Behuri. As Mujo and Behuri duel, the Ora intervenes guiding Mujo to distract Behuri and use the poison dagger which the Ora had hidden on Behuri, to slay him. With the Ora’s guidance Mujo slays his rival, revealing the Ora’s ability to provide aid and guidance to its allocated person when they are in need.

Extract from Songs of the Frontier Warriors (Mujo and Behuri), translated by Robert Elsie –

“ In flight an ora hastened to him …

'Oh look, the sun!' shout to Behuri,

And when he turns his head to see it,

Put your hand in his left pocket,

There you’ll find a poisoned dagger,

And if you skilfully manoeuvre,

The shkja will look at you no longer.”

— "Mujo and Behuri", Songs of the Frontier Warriors.

==== Zuku Bajraktar ====
Zuku Bajraktar captures his mother’s secret lover, Slavic warrior Baloz Sedlija, as his prisoner. Afraid of Zuku’s strength, his mother offers to blind her son. Zuku, taunted and captured is blinded by his mother. “Wandering aimlessly in the mountains, the blind Zuku is met by an ora who restores his sights with some herbs and tells him to take vengeance”. At midnight, Zuku slays Slavic warrior Baloz Sedlija, and burns his mother to her death.

Extract from Songs of the Frontier Warriors (Zuku Bajraktar), translated by Robert Elsie –

“For my mother, she did blind me.

The oras turned to him, responding:

You must give your word of honour,

To take vengeance on your mother,

We’ll restore your eyesight to you,

And make your eyes as you once had them.”

— "Zuku Bajraktar", Songs of the Frontier Warriors.

== Superstitions and Beliefs ==
=== The Evil Eye (Syri i Keq) ===
Syri i Keq is “one of the curses of Albania”; the Evil Eye. Evil Oras and devils would appear at night and then vanish at the “first cock-crow two hours after midnight, as they were now powerless”. Throughout Albania people would wear many types of charms to ward off the evil oras and devils. Children may have a coin tied to their forehead, or blue glass beads could be attached to the hair of both children and horses. Edith Durham reports that the dried head of a snake, cut off with a large silver medjidieh (coin) is a “very good charm” against the Evil Eye. It would be wrapped with a silver medal of St. George, then blessed by a priest - providing protection against the evil Oras and devils when worn.

=== The magical cavern ===
Edith Durham reports on the frequent supernatural happenings in the city of Gjakova, Kosovo. In the mountain side on the road to Prizren remains a cavern that travels “miles underground - some say even beneath the Drin”. A large abandoned ancient city remains within the cavern, with a bazar “stocked with all of the finest and best fruit, flesh, fish, and fair raiment”. Evil oras disguised as serpents would guard the cavern; for if any man were to touch the items within the ancient city, they would “devour him in the darkness”. Durham’s studies within Albania reveal that no man has ventured within the cavern for many years.

=== Protecting serpents ===
Albert Doja reveals beliefs about the protective ‘house snake’ throughout Albanian culture and superstitions. One must never disturb a snake, even if it’s found within a baby’s cradle as “it is the ora that belongs to the house and the baby”. As the Ora provided protection, their appearance as a serpent could also foretell unfortunate events. If you cross paths with a snake before sunrise or after sunset it “foretells the death of some of your relations.”

=== Evil Ora ===
Within Albanian folklore, the role of the Ora tends to differ. The Ora are often described as good mythological figures that offer their protection and help, but in several tales are depicted as negative and dangerous creatures. Within Albania, people believed the Ora would protect them, while others believed the Ora were dangerous creates with evil purposes. Durham reports that supernatural happenings within Albania would act as a caution, with many refusing to travel anywhere near areas believed to be cursed and/or protected by the Ora.

== Similarities to other mythological figures ==
=== Albanian differences ===
==== Northern Albanian Ghegs - The Zana ====
The Zana is a mythological figure within Northern Albanian Gheg folk beliefs and oral epics. Zana’s are depicted as mountain nymphs, and similarly to the Ora, live near springs within the highlands of Northern Albania. Robert Elsie described the Zana as “muses of the mountains” - as every mountain has its own Zana. As revealed in Albanian epic poetry, the Zana observe Albanian battles, offering their assistance and protection where needed.

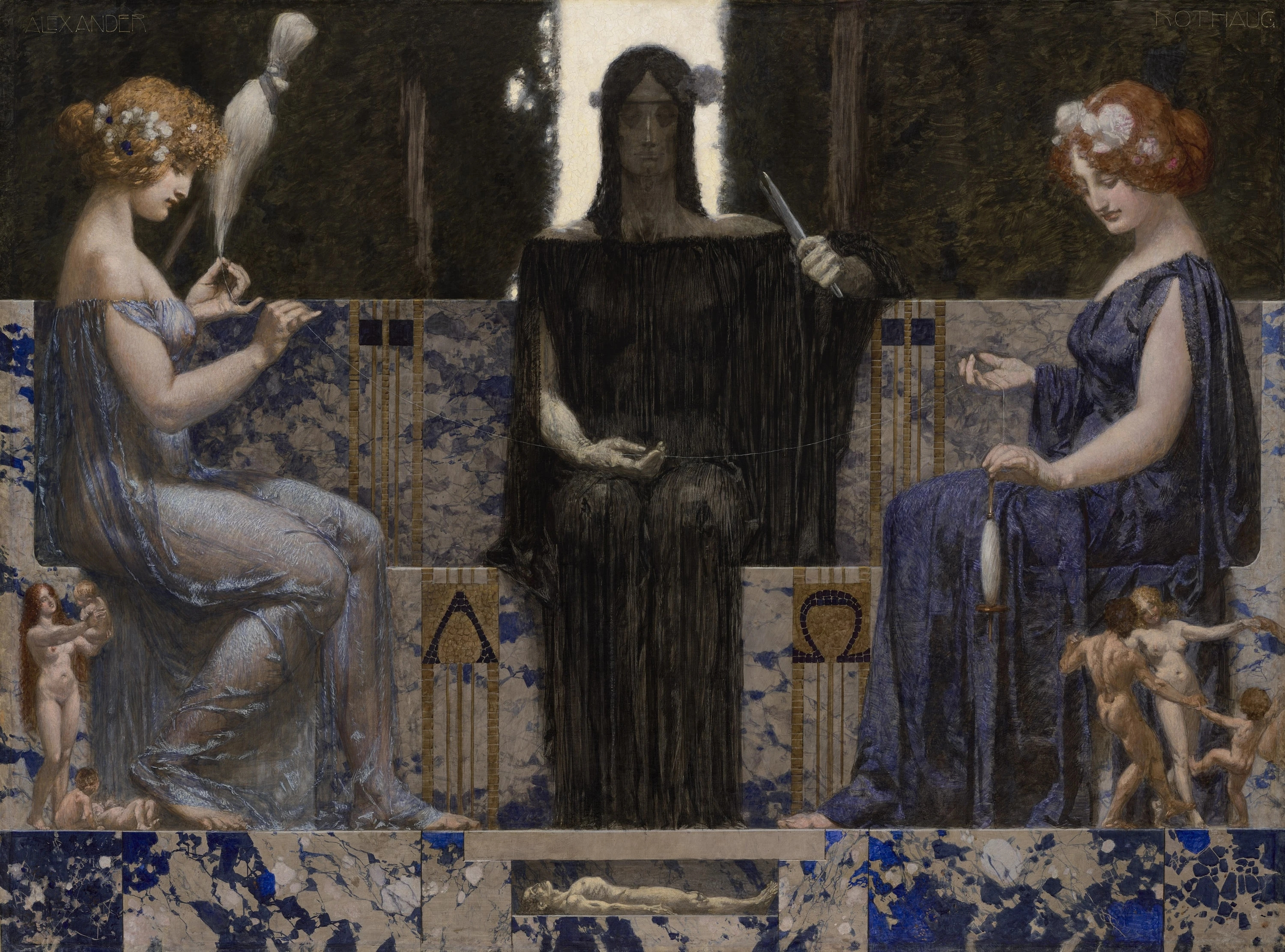
The Three Fates by Alexander Rothaug

Extract from Songs of the Frontier Warriors (Halili Avenges Mujo), translated by Robert Elsie –

“They hoisted the hero and got him up standing,

They bound all his wounds and healed all of his ailments,

They brought forth his courser and put on its saddle,

They handed the hero some herbs to inhale from,

Giving him back all his might and his power.

Mujo set off for the high mountain pastures,

Leaving his saviours, the zanas, behind him.”

— "Halili Avenges Mujo", Songs of the Frontier Warriors.

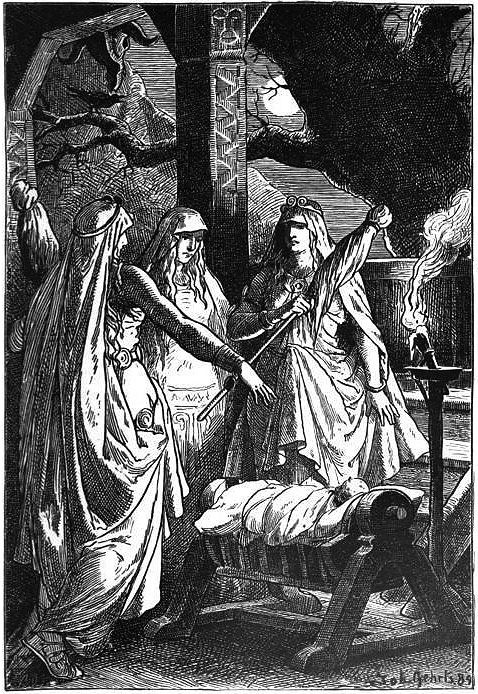
The Norns (1889) by Johannes Gehrts.

==== Southern Albanian Tosks - The Fatia, Mira and Vitore ====
The Vitore is identified with the Fatia and Mira in Southern Albanian folk beliefs and folklore. The Vitore is a household deity known as the “woman who spins” – spinning out the destiny of each person when they are born. The Vitore is often depicted as a golden horned serpent that would provide protection and bring good luck to the family of the house it resides in.

The Fatia and Mira are Tosk Albanian mythological figures that hold a similar purpose to the Gheg Albanian Ora and Zana. Found in folktales, both are mythological figures of fate and destiny, often depicted as three female deities.

=== Other similar figures ===
==== Greek Fates - The Moirai ====
The three fates of Greek Mythology, the Moirai, are represented similarly to the Ora as three goddesses who determine human destiny. They are often depicted spinning, measuring, and cutting thread, revealing their control over human life. Clotho spun the thread of life determining the destiny of each person, Lachesis measured the thread determining how long one’s life would last, and Atropos cut the thread signifying the end of one’s life. The Moirai would determine the fate of each child once they were born, whereas the Ora would wait till the “third night after the child's birth”.

==== Nordic Mythology - The Norns ====
Within Norse Mythology, the Norns were “supernatural women that controlled the fates of men”. As discussed by Snorri Sturluson, the Norns were three “maidens whose names are Urðr, Verðandi and Skuld”, meaning past, present, and future. These maidens would shape the life of every child that is born, appointing varying destinies to each – similarly to the Ora. The good Norns who are well born would shape a good life, while the bad Norns are responsible for misfortune in people’s lives.

== See also ==
- Fatia, Zana, and Vitore
- Kângë Kreshnikësh
- The Moirai
- The Norns

== Sources ==
=== Bibliography ===
- Alexander, Skye (2014). Fairies : The myths, legends, & lore. F&W Media, Incorporated. ISBN 9781440573057.
- Byock, Jesse (2004). The Norse Epic of Sigurd the Dragon Slayer. UK: Penguin. ISBN 9780141921556.
- Daniels, C. and Stevans, C., (2003). Encyclopædia Of Superstitions, Folklore, And The Occult Sciences Of The World (Volume II). 2nd ed. University Press of the Pacific. ISBN 978-1410209153
- Doja, Albert (2005). "Mythology and Destiny" (PDF). Anthropos. 100 (2): 449–462. doi:10.5771/0257-9774-2005-2-449. JSTOR 40466549.
- Durham, M. Edith (1909). High Albania. London: Centre for Albanian Studies. ISBN 9781365913099
- Elsie, Robert (2001). A Dictionary of Albanian Religion, Mythology and Folk Culture. London: Hurst & Company. ISBN 1-85065-570-7.
- Elsie, Robert (2010). Historical Dictionary of Albania. The Scarecrow Press, Inc. ISBN 9780810873803.
- Elsie, R. (2015). Albanian Folktales and Legends (2nd ed). London: Createspace Independent Publishers. ISBN 9781507631300
- Elsie, Robert; Mathie-Heck, Janice (2004). Songs of the Frontier Warriors. Wauconda, Illinois: Bolchazy-Carducci Publishers, Incorporated. ISBN 0-86516-412-6.
- Lurker, Manfred (2005). The Routledge dictionary of gods and goddesses, devils and demons. Routledge Taylor & Francis Group. ISBN 9780415340182.
- Osborn, L. (2015). Ancient Greek Mythology in the Modern Albanian Epic, "Songs of the Frontier Warriors" [PDF] Fayetteville: University of Arkansas
- Sivački Ana (2013). Specific initial (introductory) formulas in Albanian (decasyllabic) songs of the frontier warriors.[Peer Reviewed] Balcanica Institute
- Sturluson, Snorri (1992). The Prose Edda: Tales from Norse Mythology. University of California Press. ISBN 9780520234772.
