= Mira (mythology) =

Character from Berber and Arab folklore

Lalla Mira (also known as Lalla Mira al-Mtiriyya or Lalla Mira bent Hartya) is a Moroccan spiritual and folkloric figure, revered and feared within the spiritual traditions of Morocco, particularly in the culture of the Gnawa community. She is classified as a jinniyya (female spirit/demon or djinn) of great power, associated with healing, fertility, protection, abundance, and matters of love.

== Origins and identity ==
The exact origins of Lalla Mira remain uncertain. According to some folk traditions, she is a minor indigenous Moroccan deity who emerged among Berber tribes in the pre-Islamic era. Other local accounts describe her as a historical figure a pious and devout woman who sought solitude and meditation whose shrine later sank into the sea due to erosion or flooding. In popular culture, the most widespread belief is that she is a supernatural creature or a spirit belonging to the realm of the Jinn.

== Characteristics and symbolism ==
Lalla Mira is described as an independent, assertive, and flirtatious spirit, who is also demanding and possessive toward her devotees. She does not have a single, universally defined physical form. She is typically envisioned as a woman of beauty; during trance states or dream visions, she may appear in her own guise or take on the likeness of a woman already known and cherished by the person encountering her.

She is strongly associated with the colors yellow and orange. During ceremonies, her followers and devotees wear garments in these shades and utilize objects, fabrics, and candles that match this color palette. The henna plant is considered sacred to her, and she is also linked to the element of water; it is said that she particularly enjoys wandering about in the late afternoon. In addition to dwelling within the homes of her devotees, her sacred spaces natural water sources, healing springs, wells, and traditional public bath-houses (hammams).

== Gnawa rituals and ceremonies ==
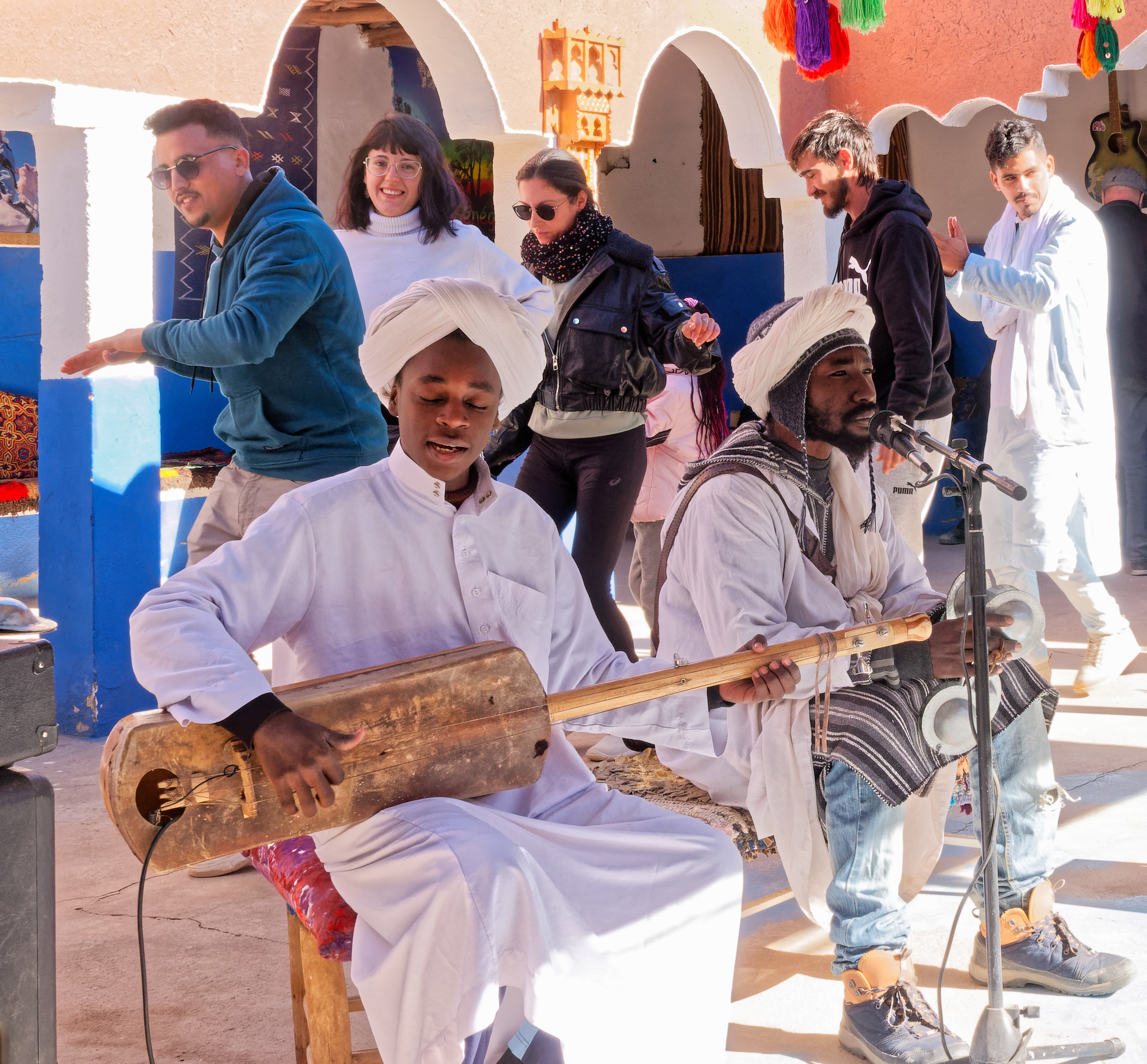
Gnawa playing music

Within Gnawa traditions and rituals, Lalla Mira is one of the entities invoked during the lila, a nocturnal ceremony that combines ritual music, chanting, prayer, trance dancing, and spiritual healing.

She is summoned through the rhythm of taarija drums and the burning of a specific blend of incense and aromatics, consisting of coriander, white and black benzoin, agarwood, salabane frankincense, turpentine, and a generous amount of sugar. During these ceremonies, participants may enter an altered state of consciousness, guided by her presence. When a medium becomes possessed by her, she is consulted as an oracle to foretell the future.

Lalla Mira maintains intense and complex bonds with her followers, at times even entering into "ritual marriages" with certain men. She typically signals her interest in a man through erotic dreams and nocturnal visitations. If the spirit feels neglected, offended, or disrespected, it is believed that she may retaliate by causing sudden paralysis, obsessions, or various physical and psychological ailments.

== Places of worship and popular culture ==
This image represents the Lalla Mira lake in the Marrakesh-Safi region of Morocco

A key landmark linked to his myth is the natural spring of the same name (Ain Lalla Mira), located at the base of the Sidi Bouzid slope at the entrance to the city of Safi. This freshwater spring continually flows between the rocks in the shade of a large wild fig tree and has been a destination for locals and tourists for centuries. People come to the spring to bathe, draw water for therapeutic or propitiatory purposes, seek healing from illnesses, promote fertility, or pray for the success of a marriage.

== In fiction ==
- Final Fantasy XIV Online: Lalla Mira is a malevolent wind elemental spirit. In the description of the level 69 FATE (The Lochs area), she is described as the cause of a sickly wind that sickens all who breathe it: "a malevolent wind spirit whose breath carries with it the very air of death."
- Mira: The Legend of the Djinns: Mira is a mysterious Djinn, the first seen in generations who has completely lost her memory. The player controls Yuba, a treasure hunter who discovers her in an ancient necropolis. The two form a "spiritual bond," a legendary connection not forged by any human in recent times—to help her recover her memories. Together, they explore the ruined realm of Fallen Amazgesh, battling mutated creatures and corrupted spirits, as they seek to uncover both Mira’s past and the catastrophe that destroyed her world and gave rise to Yuba’s own.
- LALLA MIRA THE DJINN WHO CONTROLS THE KING’S PALACE IN MOROCCO: Lalla Mira is presented as half-djinn and half-human, unmarried, confident, cunning, and powerful. Her sole, great goal is to protect the members of the Moroccan royal family.
