= Petro Korçari =

Albanian architect and master builder, chief architect of Ali Pasha of Ioannina

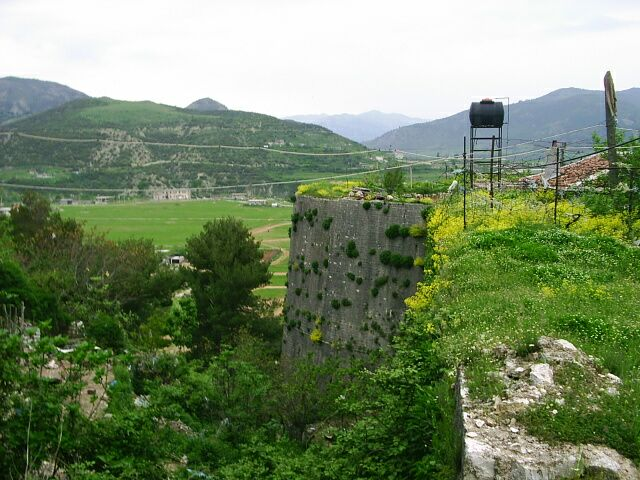
- The fortress of Tepelenë, one of the works attributed to Petro Korçari
- Born: c. 1770; Korçë region, Ottoman Empire
- Died: 1812
- Occupations: Architect, master builder
- Known for: Chief architect of Ali Pasha of Ioannina
- Movement: Ottoman architecture

Petro Korçari (also known as Petro Vithkuqari; c. 1770-1812) was an Albanian architect and master builder who served as chief architect to Ali Pasha of Ioannina (also known as Ali Pasha of Tepelenë). He directed most of the pasha's civil and military construction projects between 1800 and 1812.

== Biography ==
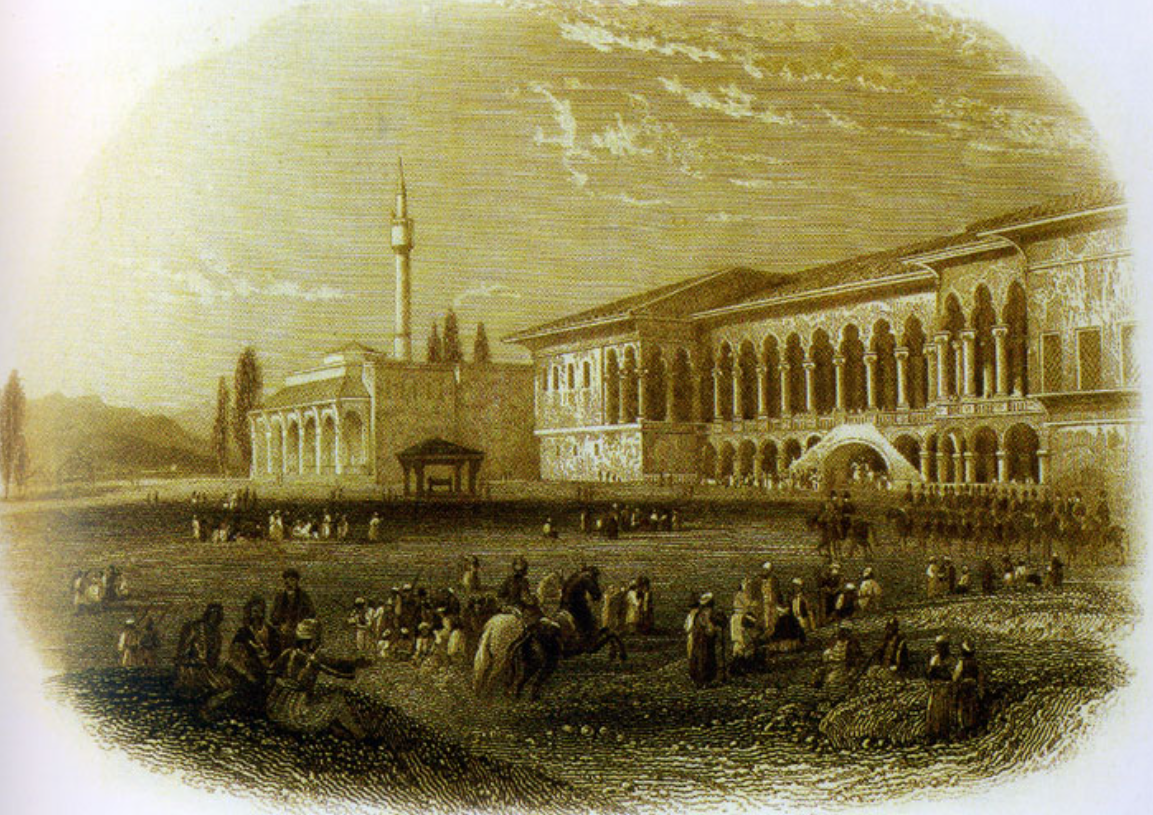
The palace of Ali Pasha in Tepelenë, engraving by Edward Finden after a drawing by William Purser (early 19th century). Korçari was one of the architects of this complex.

His name appears in two forms reflecting a scholarly debate over his origins. The historian Dhimitër Shuteriqi links him directly to the city of Korçë, hence the epithet Korçari ("the one from Korçë"). However, a document from Ali Pasha's archive identifies his birthplace as the village of Vithkuq, near Korçë, which gives rise to the alternative name Petro Vithkuqari.

He likely received architectural training in Western Europe and worked alongside Italian and French engineers in Ali Pasha's service. He is consistently described as the principal master of works for the pasha's construction programme between 1800 and 1812.

== Works ==
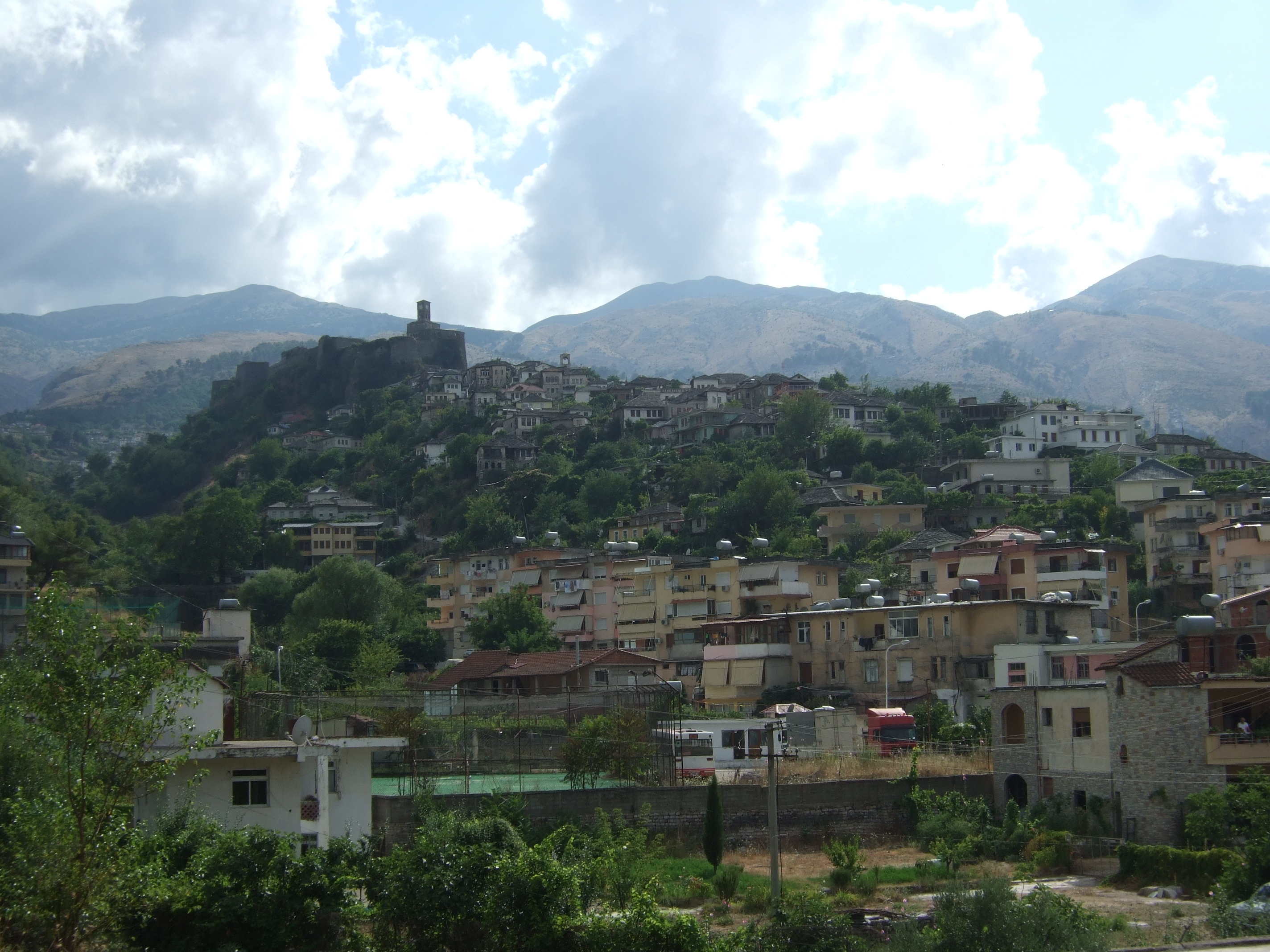
Gjirokastër Castle, reconstructed and expanded under the direction of Petro Korçari for Ali Pasha.

Korçari is regarded as the architect or master of works for a large number of constructions across what is now southern Albania and north-western Greece, encompassing fortifications, bridges, aqueducts and palaces.

=== Fortresses ===
Gjirokastër Castle is probably his most significant surviving work. Ali Pasha entrusted Korçari with the reconstruction and expansion of the fortress, which received seven new towers up to 30 metres high, several monumental gates (including the "Vizier's Gate" and the "Pasha's Gate"), underground galleries and residential quarters. The "Pasha's Room", originally built in the 18th century, was also renovated under his direction.

The fortress of Tepelenë, Ali Pasha's birthplace, is also attributed to him, along with its bridge. Both structures were destroyed in the early 19th century.

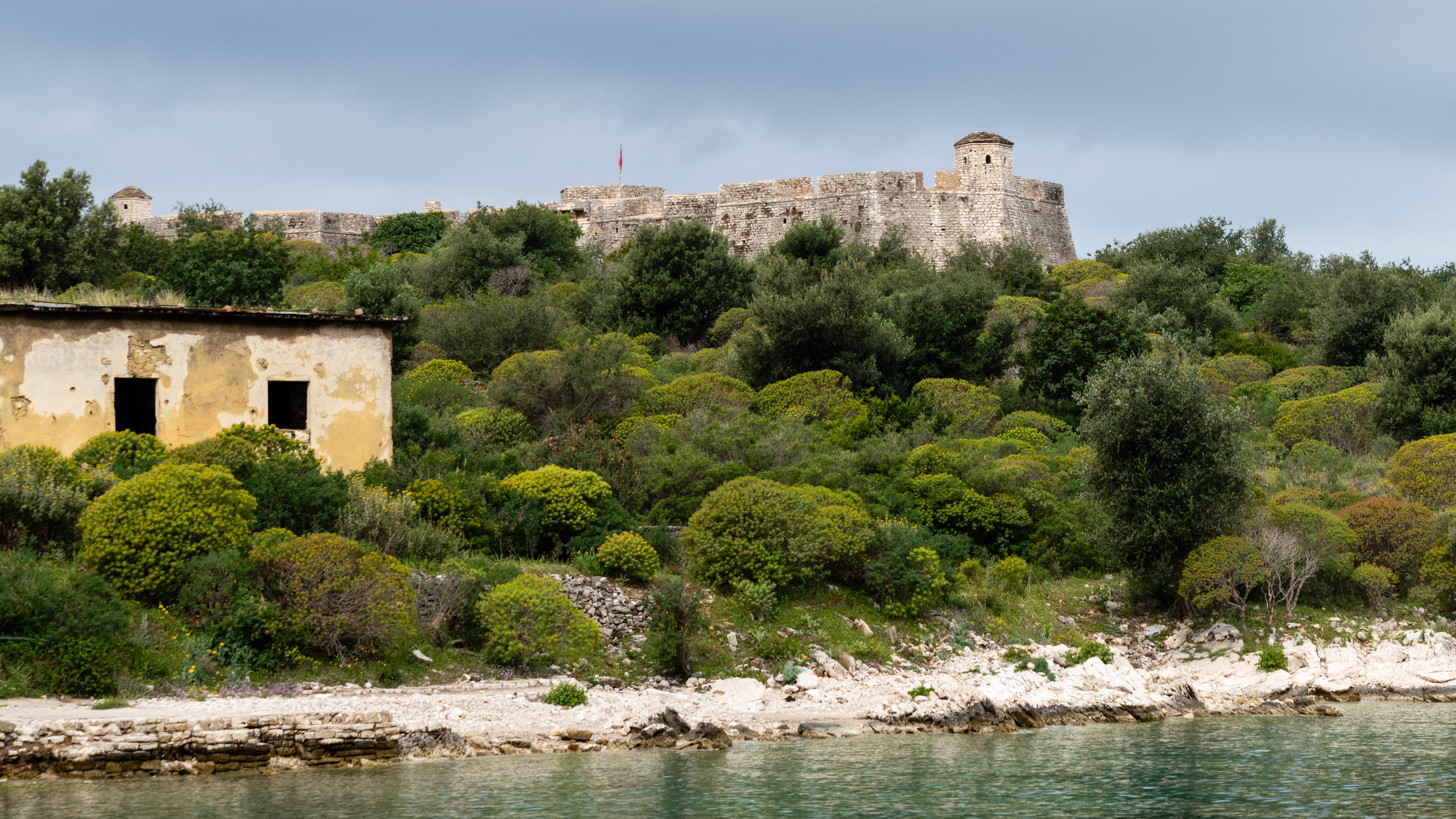
Porto Palermo Castle, near Himarë, whose reconstruction under Ali Pasha is attributed to Korçari.

Porto Palermo Castle, near Himarë, was strengthened by Ali Pasha from 1804 under Korçari's direction. This triangular fort with three bastions, designed to control the shipping lanes of the Ionian coast, is one of the best-preserved in the region.

=== Bridges and aqueducts ===
The Gjirokastër Aqueduct, also known as the "Ali Pasha Bridge" or the "Dunavat Bridge", is one of the few surviving remnants of Korçari's work. It formed the centrepiece of an extensive hydraulic network built between 1811 and 1812 to carry water from the springs of Mount Sopot, some 10 km away, to the cisterns of Gjirokastër Castle. The surviving stone bridge measures 40 metres in length, 16 metres in height and 2.3 metres in width. The greater part of the aqueduct was demolished in 1932; the Dunavat Bridge is the only section still standing.

=== Palaces and residences ===
The palaces of Ioannina were designed and built by Korçari, who was also responsible for the layout of Ioannina's urban centre. The fortress of Ioannina, completed in 1805, is considered one of his most ambitious undertakings. It was destroyed in 1822.

He also designed several houses, a mosque and a fortress at Souli, near Parga, in Greece.

=== Lost works ===
A large number of Korçari's constructions did not survive the conflicts and political instability that characterised the Epirus region during the 19th century: the fortress of Ioannina was destroyed in 1822 following the fall of Ali Pasha, the fortress and bridge of Tepelenë were razed in the early 19th century, and the terminal section of the Gjirokastër Aqueduct was demolished in 1932.

== Legacy ==
Several streets in major Albanian cities bear the name of Petro Korçari today.

== See also ==
- Ali Pasha of Ioannina
- Gjirokastër Castle
- Gjirokastër Aqueduct
- Ottoman architecture
- History of Albania
