= Baba Tomor =

Albanian deity

Baba Tomor or Baba Tomorr ('Father Tomorr') is the name of the father god, used in central Albanian mythology and folklore to refer to the father of gods and humans. Baba Tomor is related to the cult practiced on Mount Tomorr. According to the local tradition his consort is e Bukura e Dheut, a chthonic/earth goddess.

== Name ==
Baba Tomor means "Father Tomor" in Albanian, and is related to the cult practiced on Mount Tomorr.

The Albanian oronym Tomor(r) derives from the Illyrian name of mountain Tómaros, from Proto-Indo-European *tómh_{x}es-, 'dark' (cf. Latin temere 'blindly, by chance', Old Irish temel 'darkness', Old High German demar 'darkness', Old Church Slavonic tǐma 'darkness').

== Cult ==
The cult of Tomor may go back to Illyrians times, and Baba Tomor could be the remnant of an ancient Illyrian god. Mount Tomorr certainly seems to have been the site of a pre-Christian cult and to have been worshiped by the locals, both Christians and Muslims, as a mountain with a supernatural force—swearing solemn oaths "By Him of Tomorr" and "By the Holy One of Tomorr", and practicing ritual sacrifices of animals—long before the shrine of Abbas Ali was correlated with the sacred site. The name of the village Mbrakull/Vrakull at the foot of Mount Tomorr, which evolved through Albanian sound changes from Latin: oraculum, suggests the existence of an oracle in the area during antiquity.

The enduring sanctity of the mountain, the annual pilgrimage to its summit, and the solemn sacrifice of a white bull by the local people provide abundant evidence that the ancient cult of the Sky-God on Mount Tomorr continues through the generations almost untouched by the course of political events and religious changes. The ancestors of the Albanians presumably had in common with the Ancient Greek theogony the tripartite division of the administration of the world into heaven, sea, and underworld, and in the same functions as the Greek deities Zeus, Poseidon, and Hades, they would have worshiped the deities referred to as the Beauty of the Sky (i Bukuri i Qiellit), the Beauty of the Sea (e Bukura e Detit), and the Beauty of the Earth (e Bukura e Dheut). According to the local folk tradition, the Beauty of the Earth (e Bukura e Dheut) is the consort of Baba Tomor. Baba Tomor is seen as an old man with a long white beard flowing down to his belt. He is accompanied by two female eagles and the winds are his servants.

== Legacy ==
The cult of Tomor has been linked to romantic nationalism by many rilindas. In 1902, Andon Zako Çajupi, a notable Albanian rilindas, published in Cairo an anthology called Baba-Tomorri ('Father Tomorr'). Even today, Albanian people swear by him.

== See also ==
- Albanian mythology
- En (Illyrian god)
- Illyrian mythology
- Zojz

== Bibliography ==
- Bulo, Jorgo (1997). "Mali i shenjtë i Tomorrit. Nga kulti pagan te miti romantik". Perla, revistë shkencore-kulturore tremujore (4). Tiranë: 3–7.
- Çabej, Eqrem (1996). Studime etimologjike në fushë të shqipes. Vol. 4. Akademia e Shkencave e RPS të Shqipërisë, Instituti i Gjuhësisë dhe i Letërsisë.
- Clayer, Nathalie (2017). "The pilgrimage to Mount Tomor in Albania: A changing sacred place in a changing society". In Tsypylma, Darieva; Kahl, Thede; Tonchev, Svetoslava (eds.). Sakralität und Mobilität im Kaukasus und in Südosteuropa. Austrian Academy of Sciences Press. pp. 125–142. ISBN 978-3-7001-8099-9.
- Cook, Arthur Bernard (2010) [1940]. Zeus: Zeus, God of the Dark Sky (earthquakes, clouds, wind, dew, rain, meteorites). Zeus: A Study in Ancient Religion. Vol. 3 (Part 2). Cambridge University Press. ISBN 9781108021234.
- Elsie, Robert (2000). "The Christian Saints of Albania". Balkanistica. 13 (36): 35–57.
- Elsie, Robert (2001). A Dictionary of Albanian Religion, Mythology, and Folk Culture. New York, NY: New York University Press. ISBN 978-0-8147-2214-5.
- Elsie, Robert (2019). The Albanian Bektashi: History and Culture of a Dervish Order in the Balkans. Bloomsbury Publishing. ISBN 9781788315715.
- Fishta, Gjergj; Lambertz, Maximilian (1958). "Die Laute des Hochlandes (Lahuta e malcis)". Südosteuropäische Arbeiten. 51. R. Oldenbourg. ISSN 0933-6850.
- Hasluck, Margaret (2015). The Unwritten Law in Albania. Cambridge University Press. ISBN 9781107586932.
- Lurker, Manfred (2005). The Routledge Dictionary of Gods and Goddesses, Devils and Demons. Routledge, Taylor & Francis. ISBN 0-203-64351-8.
- Mallory, J.P.; Adams, D.Q. (1997). Encyclopedia of Indo-European Culture. Taylor & Francis. ISBN 9781884964985.
