= Margarita Xhepa =

Albanian actress (1932–2025)

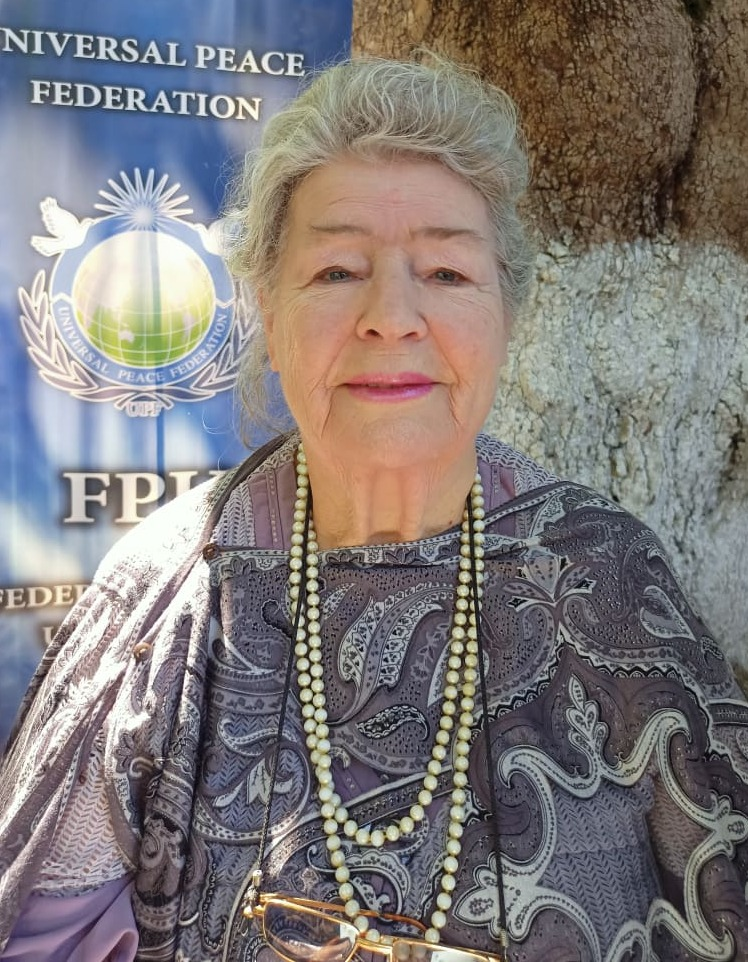
- Xhepa in 2021
- Born: Margarita Zoi Prifti; 2 April 1932; Lushnja, Albania
- Died: 3 April 2025 (aged 93); Tirana, Albania
- Education: Jordan Misja Artistic Lyceum
- Occupation: Actress
- Years active: 1958–2025
- Spouse: Xhavit Xhepa (m. 1956; died 1987)
- Children: Ndricim Xhepa, Sokol Xhepa
- Parent(s): Zoi Prifti, Marije Prifti
- Awards: People's Artist

Margarita Zoi Xhepa (Aromanian: Margarita Gepa; 2 April 1932 – 3 April 2025) was an Albanian actress. Her career spanned over eight decades with great performances of 140 theatrical plays and 40 roles in classic and modern cinema, had allowed her to be called as one of the great dames of Albanian art and culture.

== Early life ==
Xhepa was of Aromanian ethnicity. She was born in Lushnjë, Albania, as Margarita Prifti to Zoi and Marijë Prifti. Her mother died when Margarita was nine years old. From an early age, she loved Albanian poetry, and her teacher encouraged her to join acting classes. Gëzim Libohova, a well known drama teacher at the time at the cultural institute of Lushnjë, was scouting among local schools for an appropriate match for the role of a young Russian girl in a theatre play. As he saw Xhepa, he immediately chose her due to her blonde hair and blue eyes. The play was so successful it premiered also in Fier and Berat.

After finishing elementary school, she applied to the well known Liceu Artistik (School of Arts) in Tirana, in the drama department.

== Career ==
Xhepa began her career in Tirana, at the National Theatre (Albanian: Teatri Kombëtar). There, she performed in plays by Anton Chekov, Friedrich Schiller, Nikolai Gogol, and others. She presented the first Festivali i Këngës in 1962.

Considered as one of the greatest ladies of Albanian cinema and theater, she was honored with the title of People's Artist of Albania.

She continued to play in recent films such as portraying Firdus in 'Bolero në vilën e pleqve,' based on the novel of the same title by Fatos Kongoli.

=== International success ===
The actress was awarded the Actor Of Europe award in the 19th edition of the International Theater Festival. The main award for best acting went to one of the most important actresses in the wider space of Balkan theater, for the role of 'Lady Mother' in the play Who Brought Doruntina, directed by Laert Vasili.

== Death ==
Xhepa died on 3 April 2025, one day after her 93rd birthday.

== Filmography ==
1. Unë Jam Lepuri dhe Breshka nga prapa – (1999)
2. 4 Nënat e Lepurit dhe Uznova '95 – (1995)
3. E dashur Armike – (1993)
4. E Zeza e Nënës – (1993)
5. E shtuna e 11 Korrikut Xhiro – (1992)
6. Gjyshja dhe Motra – (1992)
7. Nositi – (1990)
8. Uznova '89 (1989)
9. Këngët Të Zemrës – (1987)
10. Vrasje Në Gjueti – (1987)
11. Rrethi i Kujtesës – (1987)
12. Fjalë pa Fund – (1987)
13. Dhe Vjen Një Ditë dhe Gabimi – (1986)
14. Gurët e shtëpisë sime – (1985)
15. Militanti – (1984)
16. Apasionata – (1983)
17. Dora e ngrohtë – (1983)
18. Shokët – (1982)
19. Dita e parë e emrimit – (1981)
20. Me hapin e shokëve – (1979) (TV)
21. Dollia e dasmës sime – (1978)
22. Gjeneral gramafoni – (1978)
23. Koncert në vitin 1936 (1978)
24. Dimri i fundit – (1976)
25. Pylli i lirisë – (1976)
26. Tokë e përgjakur – (1976)
27. Vitet e para – (1965)
