= Napoloni =

Napoloni is an Albanian dance performed mainly in Central Albania (mainly in Tirana). It is mainly performed at weddings.
