= E Bukura e Detit =

Albanian mythological character

E Bukura e Detit ("the Beauty of the Sea") is a character in Albanian mythology and folklore, depicted in some traditions as a sea-fairy / nymph, and in other traditions as a sea goddess, the counterpart of e Bukura e Dheut (the Beauty of the Earth) and i Bukuri i Qiellit (the Beauty of the Sky). In some Albanian traditions she is regarded as the sister of e Bukura e Dheut.

== Mythology ==
The ancestors of the Albanians presumably had in common with the Ancient Greek theogony the tripartite division of the administration of the world into heaven, sea, and underworld, and in the same functions as the Greek deities Zeus, Poseidon, and Hades, they would have worshiped the deities referred to as the Beauty of the Sky (i Bukuri i Qiellit), the Beauty of the Sea (e Bukura e Detit), and the Beauty of the Earth (e Bukura e Dheut). The phrases "the Beauty of the Sea" and "the Beauty of the Earth" are kept to refer to figures of Albanian folk beliefs and fairy tales, "the Beauty of the Sky" continues to be used in Albanian to refer to the monotheistic God.

With the attributes of a sea-fairy / nymph (Albanian: nuse deti), e Bukura e Detit is similar to the Albanian mythological figures of perria e detit, ksheta/floçka e detit, and zana e ujit.

== See also ==
- Drangue
- En (deity)
- Kulshedra
- Perria
- Prende
- Zojz (deity)

== Sources ==
=== Bibliography ===
- Bane, Theresa (2013). Encyclopedia of Fairies in World Folklore and Mythology. McFarland. ISBN 9781476612423.
- Çabej, Eqrem (1975). Studime gjuhësore: Gjuhë. Folklor. Letërsi. Diskutime (in Albanian). Vol. 5. Rilindja.
- Elsie, Robert (2001). A Dictionary of Albanian Religion, Mythology and Folk Culture. London: Hurst & Company. ISBN 1-85065-570-7.
- Fishta, Gjergj; Lambertz, Maximilian (1958). "Die Laute des Hochlandes (Lahuta e malcis)". Südosteuropäische Arbeiten. 51. R. Oldenbourg. ISSN 0933-6850.
- Halimi, Mehmet (1972). "Vëzhgime mbi të folmen e Moravës së Poshtme". Gjurmime Albanologjike. 1–4. Albanological Institute of Prishtina.
- Lurker, Manfred (2005). The Routledge Dictionary of Gods and Goddesses, Devils and Demons. Routledge, Taylor & Francis. ISBN 0-203-64351-8.
- Tirta, Mark (2004). Petrit Bezhani (ed.). Mitologjia ndër shqiptarë (in Albanian). Tirana: Mësonjëtorja. ISBN 99927-938-9-9.
- Ushaku, Ruzhdi (1988). "Mbi strukturën leksiko-semantike dhe etimologjike të tipit të togfjalëshit të shqipes burri i dheut (Mundësia për një rindërtim)". Gjurmime Albanologjike. 17–18. Albanological Institute of Prishtina: 63–76.
