= List of Albanian dances =

List of dances from Albania and broader Albanian culture

The following is an incomplete list of traditional dances in Albanian culture, because each region has its own dances:

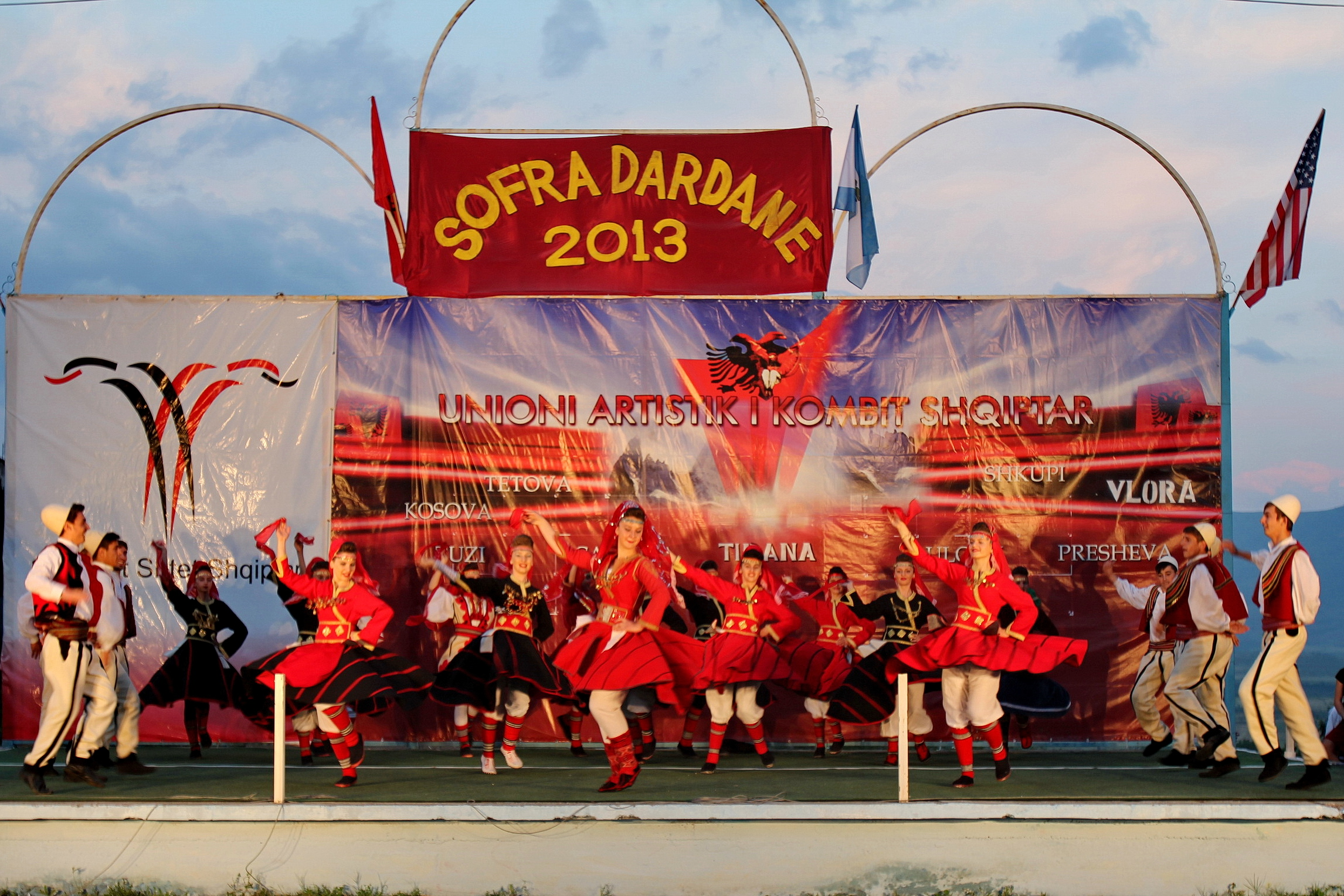

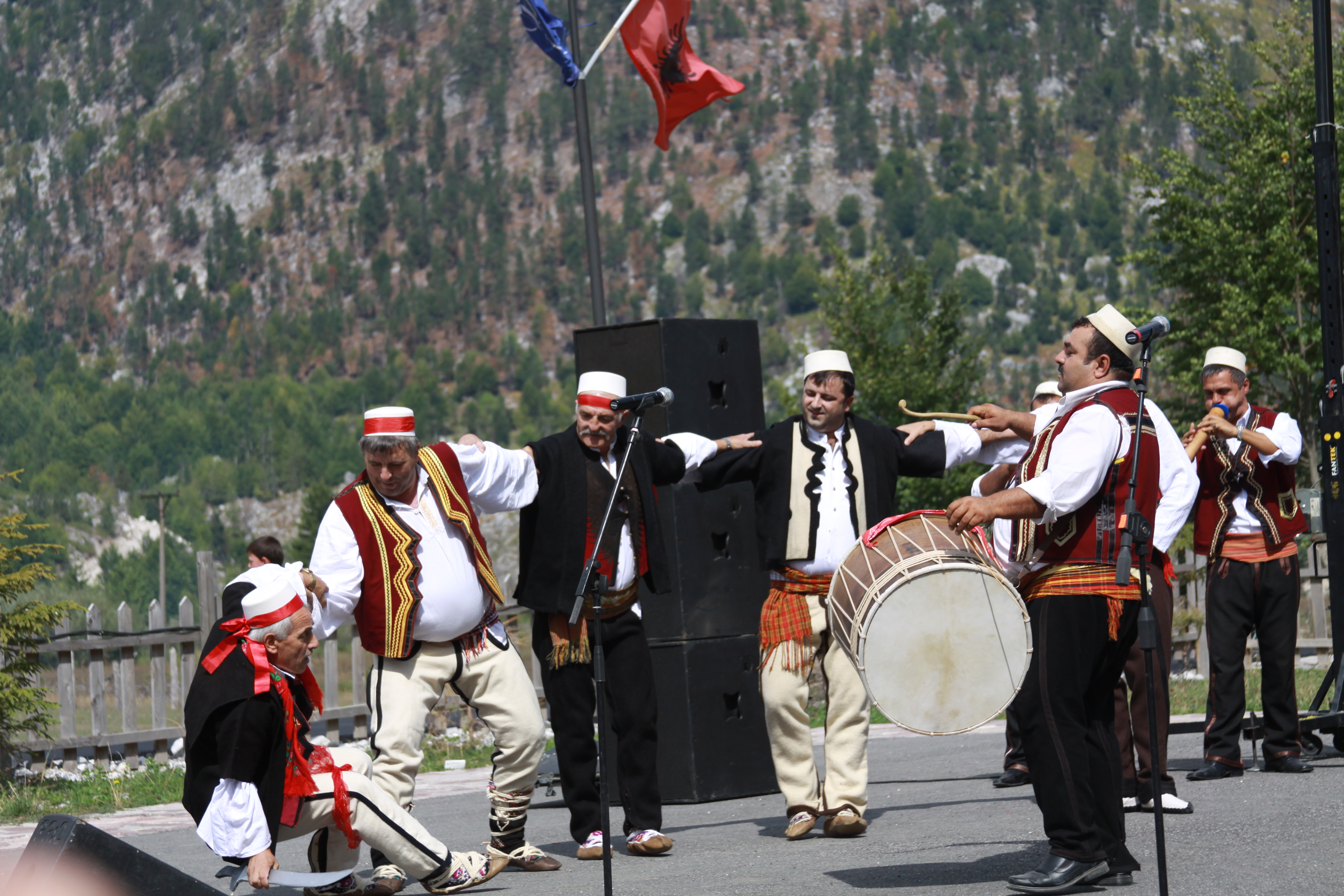

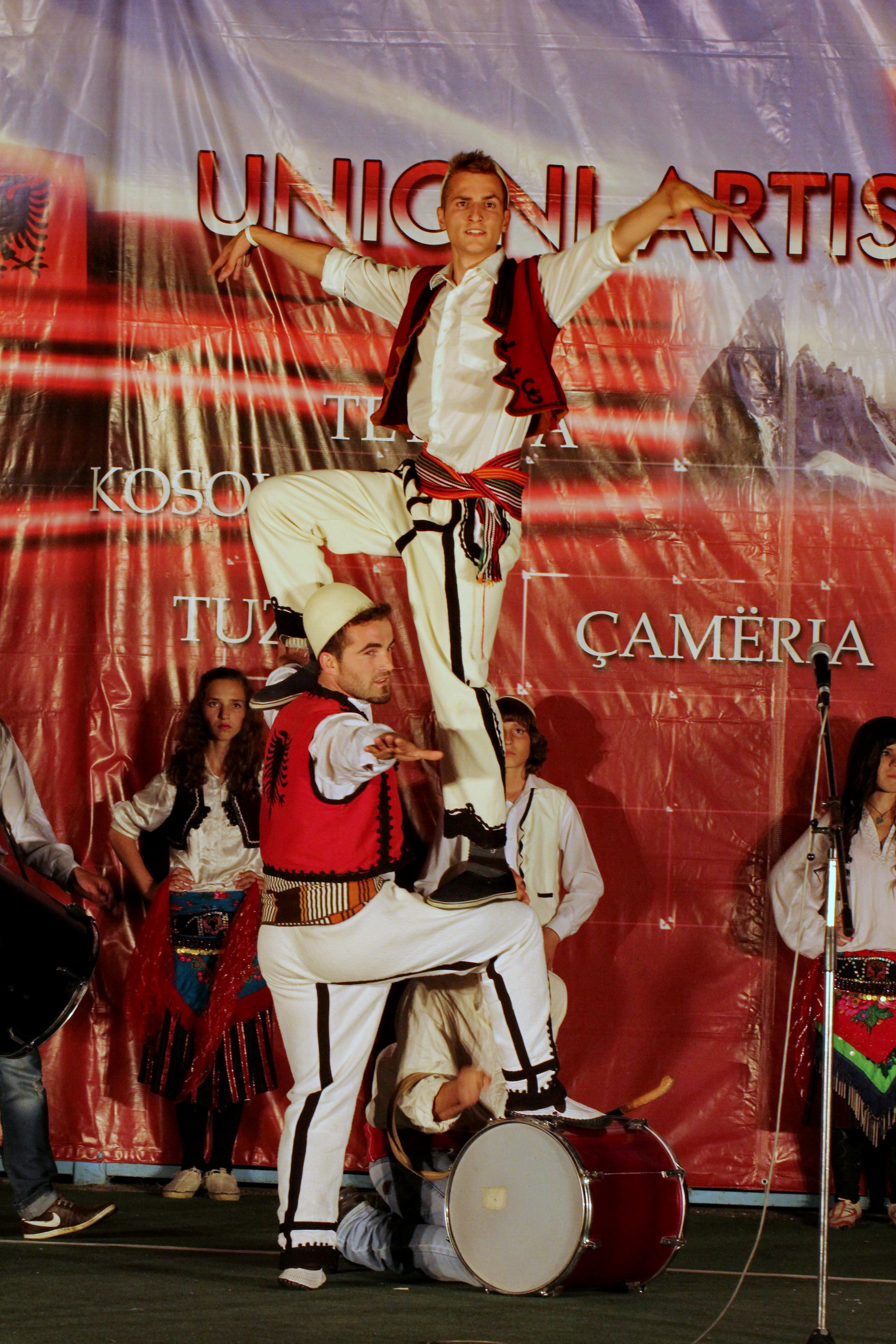

- Albanian war dances
- Gocja e Malësisë
- Gusharaveli (or Dumsharaveli, a mixed Afro-Albanian dance)
- Napoloni
- Pogonishte
- Qyqek (Belly Dance)
- Shamia e Beqarit
- Vallja e Çobanit
- Vallja e Bareshës
- Vallja e Çelo Mezanit
- Vallja e Devollit
- Vallja e Gajdes
- Vallja e Kavajës
- Vallja e Katjushkës
- Vallja e Kërçovës
- Vallja e Krushqve
- Vallja e Kukësit
- Vallja e Osman Agës
- Vallja e Rugovës
- Vallja e Rrajcës
- Vallja e Shestanit
- Vallja e Shqipeve
- Vallja e Trimave
- Vallja e Tropojës
- Vallja e Tiranes
- Vallja e Shotës
- Vallja Came
- Vallja e Dibres
- Vallja Popullore
- Vallja e Pinguinit
- Vallja e Shupalit
- Vallja Osman Taka
- Vallja Gorarçe
- Vallja e Burrave/Devollice
- Vallja e Gilanit Gilanka
- Vallja Dimkes
- Vallja e Malesise
- Vallja e Pijanecit
- Vallja e Rrajces

Traditional Albanian clothing, dances, and folklore are showcased in several festivals including the Gjirokastër National Folklore Festival in Gjirokastër; Sofra Dardane every June in Bajram Curri; Oda Dibrane in Peshkopi; Logu I Bjeshkeve every August in Kelmend; Cham Dance Festival in Saranda; and other festivals in various Albanian cities.

== See also ==
- Gjirokastër National Folklore Festival
