= Gusharaveli =

Gusharaveli, also known as Dumsharaveli or Vallja e Detarëve, is an Afro-Albanian dance performed only in Ulcinj, Montenegro. This dance is rarely performed at weddings, unlike other Albanian dances, but is more present in festivals or local holidays. It is believed that the dance originates from a combination of Africans rhythm and a bit of local Albanian rhythm. It is a dance in duple timing (2/2) and in groups.
