= Perria =

Albanian mythological creature

Perria or Pehria is a fairy-like mountain figure in Albanian mythology and folklore.

== Etymology ==
Most certainly derived from the Turkish word peri, which is a fairy in Turkish mythology.

== Description ==
Perria is generally a protective figure; however, she can also do harm. In Albanian popular belief, she is depicted as female mountain-spirits clad in white. Their duty is to punish anyone who is wasteful with bread by disfiguring the person and making him a "crooked hunchback".

== See also ==
- Zana e malit
- Shtojzovalle
- Ora
- Fatia
- Bardha
- Nëna e Vatrës
- E Bukura e Dheut
- Prende
- Kulshedra

== Sources ==
=== Bibliography ===
- Elsie, Robert (2001). A Dictionary of Albanian Religion, Mythology and Folk Culture. London: Hurst & Company. ISBN 1-85065-570-7.
- Lurker, Manfred (2004). The Routledge dictionary of gods and goddesses, devils and demons. Routledge. p. 207. ISBN 978-0-415-34018-2.
