= The Youth and the Maiden with Stars on their Foreheads and Crescents on their Breasts =

Albanian folktale

The Youth and the Maiden with Stars on their Foreheads and Crescents on their Breasts is an Albanian folktale. It is related to the theme of the calumniated wife and classified in the international Aarne-Thompson-Uther Index as type ATU 707, "The Three Golden Children". These tales refer to stories where a girl promises a king she will bear a child or children with wonderful attributes, but her jealous relatives or the king's wives plot against the babies and their mother.

== Sources ==
The tale was translated by Albanologist Robert Elsie and sourced to a publication by French scholar Auguste Dozon. Elsie stated that the original name of the tale, in Albanian, was "Djali dhe vajza me yll në ball dhe hënëz në kraharuar".

Dozon collected the tale in Albanian in his book Manual de la langue Chkipe and published it in French with the title Les Soeurs Jaleuses, in Contes Albanais.

Dozon's tale was also translated into German by linguist August Leskien in his book of Balkan folktales, with the title Die neidischen Schwestern ("The Jealous Sisters").

The tale was also translated into English as The Jealous Sisters, and published in The Slavonic and East European Review.

== Summary ==
A king dies. A new king ascends to the throne and orders that no one is to light any candle at night during his coronation. Despite the ban, the new king wears a disguise and walks through the city, until he reaches the house of the previous king's three daughters, who are talking to one another: the elder promises to weave a carpet large enough for the whole army to sit, and there would still be room left; the middle promises to weave a tent for the whole army, and there would still be room left, and the youngest promises to give birth to twins, a boy and a girl with stars on their foreheads and crescents on their breasts.

The new king summons the three sisters the next morning and marries all three, the elder two fulfilling their boasts in this tale. The youngest also gives birth to the titular twins, but her sisters take the children, place them in a box and order a servant to throw them in the river. They also tell the king his third wife gave birth to a little kitten and a mouse, and the king, enraged, orders the woman to be placed in the stairs and to be spat on.

Meanwhile, the box with the children is found by an old miller and his wife, and the couple raise them. After the old miller's wife dies, on his deathbed, the old miller tells the male twin to wait 40 days after his death to enter a cave and fetch a magic bridle. The male twin follows his last request, finds the bridle and summons two horses, one for him other for his sister, and they go to the king's city where the male twin opens a coffee house, while the female twin spends time at home.

One day, the king pays a visit to the coffee house, and sees the boy with the moon on his forehead. The king goes back to the palace and comments with his two wives about him. The two wives realize the twins have survived, and send an old woman to their house. The old woman talks to the female twin about the flower of the Earthly Beauty for her to play with. After the male twin returns home, his sister tells she wants the Earthly Beauty's flower.

The male twin summons a horse with the bridle and rides away. He first reaches a Kulshedra, who gives up eating him since the boy is so handsome. The first kulshedra does not know the location of the Earthly Beauty, so she sends him to her elder sister. The second Kulshedra also does not know, so she sends her to the eldest sister, another Kulshedra. The third one knows where she lives, and advises him to rub his scarf on her door, give brains to lion and grass to a lamb so the animals let him pass, enter the garden and pluck the flower.

The male twin takes the flower to his sister. Seeing that the boy survived, the king's two wives send the old woman again, who, this time, convinces the girl to ask for the Earthly Beauty's scarf. Thus the male twin also goes for the scarf.

The third time, the old woman convinces the girl to ask for the Earthly Beauty herself. The male twin rides to the third kulshedra, who warns him that to quest for the Earthly Beauty is no easy task, and advises him to find her ring first, since it is the source of her power. The male twin passes the animals in the garden and enters the Earthly Beauty's chambers. While she is fast asleep, the male twin takes off the ring from her finger and she wakes up. The maiden notices the boy has overpowered her and goes with him to his sister.

Later, the king visits the coffee house again and returns to the palace, to summon a feast for the boy with the star and his family. The twins' aunts - the third queen's sisters - order the cooks to poison the food, but the Earthly Beauty, who married the male twin, notices the danger and tells the twins not to eat anything, but they eat a bit from the king's dish of stewed prunes.

At the end of the feast, the king suggests each tell a story. The male twin tells the story of his life and their mother. The king learns of the truth, orders the execution of his two elder wives and restores the youngest as his queen.

== Analysis ==
=== Tale type ===
The tale is classified in the international Aarne-Thompson-Uther Index as type ATU 707, "The Three Golden Children". In this cycle of stories, a woman promises to bear children of wondrous aspect, who are taken from her as soon as they are born by her jealous relatives (her sisters or her mother-in-law). The children survive and are adopted by a childless couple. Years later, the children are sent on a quest for marvellous items, which will eventually lead to reuniting the family.

Linguist Martin Camaj and Uta Schier-Oberdoffer noted that an Albanian tale they published (see below) matched Turkish tale type TTV 239. Turkish tale type TTV 239, as it appears in the Typen Turkischer Volksmärchen (devised by folklorists Wolfram Eberhard and Pertev Naili Boratav), is named Die Schöne or Güzel ("The Beautiful"), and concerns a quest for a woman of renowned beauty and supernatural powers, who becomes the male twin's wife at the end of the story and reveals the whole truth to the king.

In a late 19th analysis, scholar W. A. Clouston named Dozon's tale as the "Albanian version" of the story The Sisters Envious of Their Cadette, from The Arabian Nights - another tale of the same tale type.

=== Motifs ===
The tale features characters from Albanian mythology, like Bukura e dheut (translated as "Earthly Beauty") and the kulshedra. According to Elsie, kulshedra is a female creature of Albanian folklore, who is described as a serpent, and linked to storms. In the tale type of "The Jealous Sisters", the envious aunts send their nephew to quest for the Bukura e Dheut as a way to get rid of him, but the Bukura e Dheut is actually helpful towards the boy and helps to reunite the family and punish the wicked aunts.

According to Myzafere Mustafa, in Albanian tales, the number three is prevalent, and the opposition occurs between two elder sisters and their cadette. As such, the three sisters want to marry the king's son or the king himself, and promise grand feats to impress him: the first one boasts she could weave a tent to house the whole army and more, the middle one that she can sew a rug or carpet for the whole army to sit and more, and the youngest promises to bear a boy and a girl with a star on the front and a Moon on the chest. In some stories, all three sisters fulfill their boasts, but in others only the youngest's promise is realized.

== Variants ==
=== Albania ===
Martin Camaj collected an Albanian variant translated as Das Mädchen mit dem Mond und der Junge mit dem Stern auf der Stirn, from informant Avdyl Dragideli. In Avdyl Dragideli's narration, the tale begins with three sisters declaring their wishes to marry the king, and promising great feats: the elder that she can weave a sleeping mat and a blanket for the whole army to seat, and half would still be unseated; the middle one that she can prepare food for the whole army, and there would still be half uneaten; the youngest promises to give birth to the titular twins with astral birthmarks.

Folklorist Anton Berisha published another Albanian language tale, titled "Djali dhe vajza me yll në ballë".

==== The Boy with a Star on the Front and a Girl with a Moon on the Breast (Kozhicë) ====
Folklorist Anton Çetta collected a tale from an Albanian source in Kozhicë, Drenicë, with the title Djali me yll ne ballë dhe çika me hanë në krahnor ("The Boy with a Star on the Front and a Girl with a Moon on the Breast"). In this tale, a king forbids lighting any light source at night, and sends his soldiers to investigate if someone is breaking the ban. One night, the soldiers find a house of an old man and his three daughters, who are by the stove in conversation about marrying their king: the elder boasts she can cook a pot of food for the whole world to eat, and there would be food to spare, the middle one that she could weave a prayer mat for the king to hold the whole army, and there would be room left, and the youngest promises to bear him twins, a boy with a star on the forehead and a girl with the moon on her breast ("gjyks", in the original). The soldiers report to the king, who sends for the sisters to explain their wishes in his presence. The king takes the third sister as his new queen, but he is already married to a co-wife. The third sister gives birth to her promised twins, but the elder queen casts them in the water in a box and replace them for objects. The king falls for the deception, and orders his wife to be locked in a slaughterhouse and for people to spit on her. As for the children, an old man rescues them from the water and raises them. The old man gives the boy a bridle to summon a horse named Dygdygli. When the twins grow up, the boy beckons the horse and rides with his sister to dry land, where they buy a house and the boy studies to become a hoxha at the mosque. The king meets the boy at the mosque, and grows fond of him, to the elder queen's concern. The elder queen sends a servant to the twins' house. The female twin says she is bored and the servant tells her about a bird that flies on stone slab somewhere on a mountain that can ease her boredom. The female twin then sends the male twin for the bird, but his horse Dygdygli tries to dissuade its master from such a quest, since the bird petrifies anyone that approaches it. The male twin, however, states he made a vow ("besën", in the original) to his sister, rides up the mountain and meets the bird, but the animal sends him to fetch two wild horses from another kingdom. When the youth goes to fetch the horses, the guards capture him and request they bring him a girl ("çika") that lives in a tower. The youth goes to the girl's tower, both have a meal and fall in love with each other, and he takes her back with him, as well as the horses and the bird. At home, he leaves the girl and the bird and returns to his position of hoxha at the same mosque the king attends, to the latter's surprise. Since the young hoxha has been absent for weeks, the king invites him for dinner at the palace. The youth's wife, the Çika, advises him to eat with a spoon and throw out the food to avoid being poisoned. When the twins and Çika pass by the disgraced queen, the twins do not spit at her, disobeying the king's order to do so. The twins invite the king to their house and the king notices the bird, which the twins explain entertains them with its singing. Çika, the male twin's wife, bids the bird to sing, and it reveals to the king the whole story of the three sisters and their wishes, the birth of the twins, how the elder queen tricked the monarch, and how she tries to kill the twins during the banquet at the king's palace. Çika points to the twins as the royal children, and the king recognizes them. The male twin then tells the king he must get rid of the first wife and the maidservant first. The monarch then orders the elder wife and the servant to be executed, and reinstates his second wife as his only queen.

==== Three Sisters ====
In an Albanian tale published by folklorist Anton Çetta with the title Tri motrat ("Three Sisters"), three sisters are talking about their marriage plans, and the third wishes to marry the king himself. The monarch overhears their conversation and arranges for their wishes to be fulfilled, with him marrying the third sister, which earns her the ire and jealousy of the elder two. Intent on destroying their cadette, the elder sisters consult with a witch and hire her as their sister's midwife. The new queen gives birth to twins, a boy and a girl, who are replaced for puppies and cast in the sea in a box. The king believes in the sisters' deception and orders his wife to be buried up to the waist in manure. As for the children, they are rescued from the water and raised by a peasant couple. Years later, the sisters learn their nephew and niece are alive and send the witch to eliminate them before the king learns of their survival. Thus, the witch pays a visit to the female twin and tells her to send her brother to fetch her leaves from a magical oak tree that belongs to a zana (a fairy woman). The brother rides to the zana's lands and steals some leaves from her oak tree, when she spots the thief and calls out to him, causing his legs to petrify. The boy's knife falls from his belt on his petrified legs and breaks the spell, allowing him to escape before he turns to stone. Next, per the witch's suggestion, the sister sends her brother to steal a branch of the zana's oak tree. Thirdly, the male twin goes for the entire oak tree for his sister. The zana stops the male twin from stealing the tree and talks him into taking her with him. The brother then carries off the oak tree and the zana with him. The zana discovers the perfidious witch and kills her by knocking her head against the ground. The king learns of the events and reunites with his twin children.

==== The Earthly Beauty (Gajre) ====
In a tale collected from a Gheg Albanian source in the village of Gajre, Tetovë, with the title E Bukura e Dheut ("The Earthly Beauty"), three unmarried sisters talk to each other about their marriage plans with the king: the elder boasts she can clothe the whole army with a cubit of felt, the middle one that she can feed the whole army with a single loaf of bread, and the third promises to bear him twins, a boy and a girl with a star on the front and a Moon on the right arm, teeth of ivory and hair of silk. A person overhears their conversation and reports to the king. The monarch sends for the trio and orders them to fulfill their boasts: the elder two dismiss the impossibility of their tasks, and are sent to a guest house as servants, while the king marries the third sisters. After nine months, she gives birth to her promised twins, to the elder sisters' jealousy. The duo conspire to humiliate their cadette: they place the children in a box and cast them in the mill trough, then place two puppies to trick the king. The king falls for the deception and orders his wife to be placed inside a chest filled with stones and for people to spit on her. As for the children, the miller rescues the box, finds the twins and raises them with his wife. Years later, the miller's biological son asks his mother why she loves the twins more, since they are foundlings. The female twin overhears the conversation and tells her brother they are not the miller's children, so they leave and establish themselves elsewhere near a mountain, where they build a house.

A witch pays them a visit and tells the female twin their house is beautiful, but lacks the nightingale in a cage. The female twin then sends her brother for a nightingale in a cage that lies in the king's garden. The brother steals the bird and brings it home, where the animal delights the twins with its singing. Next, the witch tells the female twin about the Earthly Beauty ("E Bukura e Dheut") that her brother can find her. The brother goes to on a quest to find this maiden and enters a cave that belongs to a div-mother of twelve divs. The male twin is welcomed by the div-mother and hidden from her div-family, until they leave. The male twin then asks for directions to the Earthly Beauty, and the div-mother says she turns people to stone. Still, she advises the youth how to proceed: he will reach a city with a bakery with bread inside which he is to grab in his hand and compliment it; wash his hands in two taps, one with pus and the other with blood, close an open door and shut an open one, exchange the fodder between two animals (meat for a wolf, grass for a ram), enter the Earthly Beauty's chambers and knock her down with a cane. The youth follows the instructions to the letter and kidnaps the Earthly Beauty, who commands her guardians to stop the boy, but they stay their proverbial hand due to the youth's kind actions. On the road back, the youth sees a yard full of people petrified by the Earthly Beauty and orders her to restore them. Despite some misgivings about the deed, the maiden restores ther victims to life and returns with the youth to his twin sister's house.

The Earthly Beauty marries the male twin and sends him to the coffee house with a sum of liras for him to pay his daily coffee. This draws the attention of the king, who meets the youth and pays him and his sister a visit for a meal. In return, the king invites the twins and the Earthly Beauty to his palace for a banquet. The Earthly Beauty advises her husband and his female twin they will pass by the imprisoned queen and the girls will spit on her, but the boy is to embrace and mourn for her. It happens thus, and the king takes notice of this. During the banquet, the male twin climbs down the horse and says it only eats meat and rice, to the people's consternation. The Earthly Beauty then retorts that the twins are the king's children by showing their astral birthmarks on their arms, and reveals the wicked elder sisters tried to kill them by casting them in water. The monarch releases his wife, bathing and clothing her, executes his sisters-in-law by burning them, and celebrates his son's wedding to the Earthly Beauty.

==== Other tales ====
In an untitled tale collected from an Albanian source in Lokvica, near Prizren District, the Emperor orders the curtains to be drawn and no light to be lit at night. A family of three sisters disobey the ban, working through the night and talking among themselves. The Emperor's servants overhear their conversation: the elder boasts she could bake bread for the whole army, the middle one that she could sew clothes for the whole army, and the youngest promises to marry the Emperor and bear him twins, a son with a moon and a star on his body and a girl that produces pearls with her tears. The Emperor is told of their boasts and marries all three, then orders his first two wives to fulfill their boasts. The elder two deny his order, saying that it is unbecoming for them such menial tasks. As for the third sister, she gives birth to her promised twin children, who are replaced for puppies as soon as they are born and thrown in the water in a box by their aunts. The duo trick the Emperor, who punishes his third wife by tying her feet and hands and giving her scraps. Back to the children, an old man in another country finds the box with the twins and rescues them, raising them as his own. Years later, the twins decide to leave their adoptive home to return to their homeland. The male twin makes his sister cry to produce a pearl, with which he buys some bread. The twins eventually meet their father, the Emperor, to whom they tell the whole story. Their mother is released and the envious sisters are killed.

=== Slovakia ===
In a Slovak variant, Zlatovlasé dvojčatá ("The Golden-Haired Twins"), the prince marries the youngest sister, who promises to give birth to twins with golden hair and a star on their breast. When the time comes, a woman named Striga steals the newly-born infants and casts them out in the water. The boy and girl are soon found and given the name Janík and Ludmilka. Years later, the Striga sets the boy on the quest for the golden pear and the woman named Drndrlienka as a companion for his sister. Scholar Jiří Polívka listed another version of this story, both grouped under his own classification "Deti nevinne vyhnatej matky" ("Sons of an Innocent Exiled Maiden").

=== South Slavic ===
In a South Slavic fairy tale, Die Mär von den drei wunderbaren Schwestern ("The Fairy Tale of the Three Wonderful Sisters"), the emperor spies three sisters talking, the youngest saying that she will give birth to twins with green eyes and golden hair, the boy will cry diamonds instead of tears and the girl will produce rose petals when she smiles. The emperor marries the youngest, she gives birth to the twins and they are replaced by puppies. The twins are saved by a miller. Years later, they hire builders with the boy's diamond tears and erect a palace. Their aunts send him after a wild Divenross (a horse from the samodivas), a golden branch that can talk, and a woman of great beauty named Pendel Hanuma. Pendel Hanuma marries the Brother and reveals the whole plot to the Emperor.

==== Serbia ====
In the 19th tale of author Đorđe Kojanov Stefanović's collection, translated as Bruder und Schwester, beide goldhaarig und silberzähnig ("Brother and Sister, golden-haired and silver-toothed"), the king searches the whole kingdom for a wife, and, in a certain place, listens to a maiden proclaiming she will bear the king twins, a boy and a girl, both with golden hair and silver teeth. The king takes the maiden as his wife and brings her home. When he leaves for war, the king orders the cook to look after her. After the queen gives birth to her twins, the cook buries the children in the garden and replaces them for puppies. The queen is banished to the dungeon and the king marries the cook's daughter. In the garden, two poplar trees sprout, a golden and a silver one. Two sheep eat some of the poplar trees and their wool becomes gilded, and the trees are later chopped down and made into beds. The beds are burnt down, but two sparks escape and touch the two sheep. The new queen orders the sheep to be killed and their livers to be given to her as remedy. The sheep are killed and their entrails are washed in the river, where the twins regain human form and are found by a fisherman. They are raised by the fisherman and leave home to another house. The evil queen learns of their survival and visits them to convince them to seek "the most beautiful flower on Earth", the Tambur-Flower (German: Tambur-Blume), and later the maiden named Djuzelgina.

==== Bosnia ====
In a Bosnian version published by author Milena Mrazović with the title Die Goldkindern ("The Gold-Children"), the youngest sister promises to give birth to a daughter with golden hair, golden hands and teeth of pearl, and a son with one golden hand, prophesizing her son will become the greatest hero that ever was. Years later, the emperor's first wife tries to get rid of the brother by telling him to kill some Moors that were threatening the realm; by sending him to tame a wild horse, Avgar, which lives in the mountains; to fetch an enchanted flowery wreath from the Jordan River; and to find an all-knowing young maiden whom "hundreds of princes have courted".

In a Bosnian-Romani tale, E Hangjuzela, Jal e Devlehki Manušni ("Hangjuzela, or the Heavenly Woman"), collected by professor Rade Uhlik from an 80-year-old woman named Seferovic Celebija, two sisters are washing their clothes in the river. The younger one says she wants to marry the king and bear a golden-toothed son and a golden-haired girl. She marries him and gives birth to the twins, who are replaced for puppies and thrown in the water. They are rescued by a fisherman. They grow up and are sent on a quest for self-playing instruments (mandolins) from the giants and for Hangjuzela, the Heavenly Woman.

==== Montenegro ====
In a tale collected by Bulgarian folklorist Kuzman Shapkarev from Kičava, modern day Montenegro, "Прайната йе до крàина, а лошотията не е до вèка", a king and his vizier disguise themselves to mingle with the people. One night, they reach the edge of the village and spy on three sisters: the eldest promises to clothe the entire army with a single spool of wool; the middle one that she can feed the whole army with a single knead of bread; and the youngest promises to bear twins, a boy and a girl with teeth and gilded pearls. The king takes them and makes the youngest his queen. Her jealous sisters take the children as soon as they are born, replace them for kittens and order a shepherd to abandon them in the mountains. The queen is punished by being buried uo to the torso, while the shepherd raises the twins. The aunts learn of the children's survival and send an old woman to the twins' house. The old woman convinces the female twin to ask her brother for a wild sea-horse and the Dunya Gyuzel as a bride for him. The male twin tames the horse and goes to find Dunya Gyuzel, who tries to turn him into a marble statue. The male twin prevails and takes Dunya Gyuzel with him. Later, the twins and Dunya Gyuzel meet the king, and Dunya Gyuzel introduces herself as his daughter-in-law, thus revealing the truth to the king.

==== Bulgaria ====
In the Bulgarian Folktale Catalogue, Bulgarian scholar Liliana Daskalova divides tale type 707 in regional subtypes. The first Bulgarian regional type is subtype 707, "Чудесните деца (Сестра спасява братята си" or "Die Wunderkinder (Die Schwester rettet ihre Brüder)" ("Wonderful Children (Sister saves her Brothers)"), with at least 23 variants registered.

The second Bulgarian regional type is subtype *707C, "Чудесните деца и пеещото дърво" or "Die Wunderkinder und der singende Baum" ("The Wonderful Children and the Singing Tree"), with 33 variants in archival version. Some of the tales show the character of the wise maiden (named Dunya Guzeli) that replaces the bird as the teller of truth.

Author Nikolay Rainov published a South Slavic tale titled "Слънце и месец" ("Sun and Moon"): a king dies, and his son ascends to the throne. To mark the occasion, the new king summons everyone to a feast, where he will choose his bride. However, none of the female guests strike his fancy, and he sends his guards to see if all girls are present. The guards arrive at the only illuminated house in the city, where an old woman asks about the commotion at the castle, and her three daughters talk among themselves about marrying the new king: the elder boasts she is able to feed the whole army with a grain of wheat, the middle one that she can clothe the whole army, and the youngest promises to bear him twins, a boy and a girl, one shining like the sun and the other like the moon. The guards report back to the king, who takes the three girls and their mother to live at the palace and marries the youngest. Some time later, the king has to go war, and, in his absence, the queen gives birth to her promised twins, the boy with a sun on his chest and the girl with a moon. The queen's elder sister takes the children and throws them in the water in a chest, and replaces them with a puppy and a kitten. The king returns and, deceived by the ruse, orders his wife to be locked in a cell and spat on by the people. As for the children, they are saved by a captain in a sailing ship, who raises the children until they are fifteen years old. On his deathbed, he tells the male twin to take the captain's horse and let it guide them: wherever it stops, the twins shall make their residence. The twins follow his adoptive father's request, and settle just next to the royal gardens, where they build a house. Their elder aunt, who became the new queen after her cadette's banishment, learns the twins are alive and consult with an old witch ways to dispose of them. The old witch pays a visit to the twins' house and convinces the female twin to send her brother for a giant mirror that shines like the sun in a forest; then, for a hen and its chicks that lays golden eggs, and lastly for a bride for her brother from the garden of the Samodivas ("Самодивска градина", in the original). When the male twin rides the horse to the garden of the Samodivas, the samodiva tries to petrify him, but the male twin overpowers her and she joins him as his bride. At the end of the tale, the Samodiva woman advises the twins to pass by their mother in the cell, kiss her and decorate her hair with flowers. They then join the king for a feast and the Samodiva says their horses are eating bones, just as absurd as a woman giving birth to animals. Author Assen Nicoloff translated the tale as Sun and Moon - Brother and Sister, and sourced it from Bulgaria. In Nicoloff's translation, the twins quest for a mirror, a golden hen and its chicks, a fountain spouting honey and butter, and lastly for a fairy maiden from a fairy ground.

=== Romania ===
Romanian author I. C. Fundescu published a Romanian tale titled Sora Criveţului. In this tale, fearing that his kingdom may be burnt to the ground, an emperor forbids lighting any candle at night. One particular house, however, breaks his ban, and the emperor goes with his viziers and cooks to check on them; three sisters are talking about their marriage wishes: the elder wants to marry the cook, for she is able to feed her home with a single piece of bread; the middle one wants to marry the vizier, for she boasts she could guard the treasure with a single woolen coat; and the youngest wishes to marry the emperor himself and bear him three children, two boys with stars on their hearts and a moon on their backs, and a girl with the sun in front. The emperor takes the three sisters and fulfill their marriage wishes. Nine months later, the new empress gives birth to her children (in three consecutive pregnancies), but her sisters take the babies and cast them in the water. The children are saved by shepherds and raised in the forest amidst flocks. Years later, the emperor assembles a crowd for a fighting contest whose winner will be richly rewarded with gold coins. The two boys take part in the contest and win. Meanwhile, the emperor's sisters-in-law recognize the boys and send a midwife to get rid of them. The old midwife pays a visit to the girl, and tells her to find the "cămaşa babei din sfîrcurile mării" ("the shirt of the old woman of the depths of the sea"). The male siblings journey together and, advised by a giant, swim to the bottom of the sea, strip the old woman of the sea to take her shirt, and rush back home, for the old woman will cast legions of dragons and snakes on them. Undeterred, they bring home the shirt. Later, they take part in another fighting contest and win, drawing the attention of their aunts. The old midwife visits the sisters a second time and convinces her to seek the titular "Sora Crivěţului". The boys go to the giants, who advise them to shout at the girl to show herself to them. They follow their advice, but they fail and become stones. Their sister goes to rescue them and get Sora Crivěţului, by shouting the same command. Sora Crivěţului appears to her and says the girl can save her brothers by fetching some water from a nearby basin and sprinkling it on the stones. After rescuing her brothers, Sora Crivěţului joins the siblings back to their homeland, where they build another palace. At the end of the tale, the emperor calls for the people to come and tell stories; Sora Crivěţului goes and tells the truth in the form of a tale.

== See also ==
- The Golden-Haired Children
