= Shamia e Beqarit =

Shamia e Beqarit is an Albanian traditional dance and ritual, always practiced in the Albanian wedding, as the final dance, performed by the bride and the groom with the ritual burning of the handkerchief (shamia) of the bachelor (beqarit).

== Accompanying song ==
The following song accompanies the dance and whole performance, sung by participants of the wedding:

E laje ti moj goc-e, laje,

e shaminë e beqarit-e.

E shtrydhe ti moj goc-e, shtrydhe,

e shaminë e beqarit e.

E neje ti moj goc-e, neje,

e shaminë e beqarit-e.

E digje ti moj goc-e, digje,

e shaminë e beqarit-e.

Wash, oh girl, wash,

the handkerchief of the bachelor.

Squeeze, oh girl, squeeze,

the handkerchief of the bachelor.

Spread out, oh girl, spread out,

the handkerchief of the bachelor.

Burn, oh girl, burn,

the handkerchief of the bachelor.

== Bibliography ==
- Bytyçi, Xhevdet (2006). Hasan Arllati (ed.). Përmbledhje: 1200 tekste këngësh shqipe të muzikës popullore dhe argëtuese [Collection: 1200 Texts of Albanian Songs of Folk and Popular Music]. LITOGRAFIA; Ministry of Culture, Youth and Sport of Kosova.
- Kastrati, Genci (2016). "Albanian Folklore" (PDF). Folk Dance Scene. 52 (1). Folkdance Federation of California, South.
