= E Bukura e Dheut =

Crafty fairy in Albanian folklore

E Bukura e Dheut (the "Beauty of the Earth" or "Earthly Beauty") is an epithet in Albanian mythology and folklore, used in some traditions for a crafty fairy, and in other traditions for a chthonic/earth goddess, the counterpart of e Bukura e Detit (the Beauty of the Sea) and i Bukuri i Qiellit (the Beauty of the Sky).

In central Albanian folklore E Bukura e Dheut appears as the sister of e Bukura e Detit and the consort of Baba Tomor.

The quest for the e Bukura e Dheut is a very popular and frequent motif in Albanian folktales: the princely hero must search for or rescue the Earthly Beauty, even going into her mystical underworld palace.

== Role ==
E Bukura e Dheut is beauty made manifest, radiating with golden hair. She may be a good spirit or (more often) evil, with magical powers that derive from her dress, and lives in the underworld, where her palace is guarded by a three-headed dog, a kuçedra and all sorts of other weird and wonderful creatures. She is sometimes described as always ready to help, and so powerful that she can undertake tasks that would normally be the province of God or of an angel.

In some traditions e Bukura e Dheut is a chthonic goddess of the underworld or earth goddess, (Note: In a German-language review of a book of Albanian folktales, the reviewer cited that many figures of Albanian mythology appear in the book. He also described Bukura e Dheut in the following terms: die Schone der Erde, d. i. die Gottin der Unterwelt, des Frühlings und des Wachstums ("the Beauty of the Earth, i.e., the Goddess of the Underworld, of Spring and of Growth").) The ancestors of the Albanians presumably had in common with the Ancient Greek theogony the tripartite division of the administration of the world into heaven, sea, and underworld, and in the same functions as the Greek deities Zeus, Poseidon, and Hades, they would have worshiped the deities referred to as the Beauty of the Sky (i Bukuri i Qiellit), the Beauty of the Sea (e Bukura e Detit), and the Beauty of the Earth (e Bukura e Dheut). The phrases "the Beauty of the Sea" and "the Beauty of the Earth" are kept to refer to figures of Albanian folk beliefs and fairy tales, "the Beauty of the Sky" continues to be used in Albanian to refer to the monotheistic God. In central Albanian folklore, e Bukura e Dheut is the wife of Baba Tomor.

== Appearances in folktales ==
Albanologist Robert Elsie and Janice Mathie-Heck stated that the character is very popular in Albanian myths and fairy tales. The quest for the e Bukura e Dheut is a very popular and frequent motif in Albanian folktales: the princely hero must search for or rescue the Earthly Beauty, even going into her mystical underworld palace.

English traveller Lucy Mary Jane Garnett noted the character is present in Albanian and Greek folktales as "Beauty of the Earth" or "[Beauty of] the World".

=== In Albania ===
Her name is given as "Beautiful of the Earth" by Martin Camaj and she is present as a character in Albanian Wonder Tales, by George Post Wheeler: The Boy who killed the Dîf, The Boy who took the Letter to the World where the Dead live, The Boy who was fated to be a King and The Boy who was Brother to the Drague. This last tale is an English translation of the epic The Twins, the story of brothers Zjermi and Handa.

Her name is translated as "Belle of the Earth" in another variant of tale type ATU 707, identified as the "Albanian version" of the story, collected in Auguste Dozon's Contes Albanais (Paris, 1881) and published in Variants and analogues of the tales in Vol. III of Sir R. F. Burton's Supplemental Arabian Nights (1887), by W. A. Clouston. Dozon himself had collected three tales with the character, named La Belle de la Terre: Tale II - Les Soeurs Jaleuses ("The Envious Sisters"), Tale V - La Belle de la Terre ("The Beauty of the World") and Tale XII - La Loubie et la Belle de la Terre.

Parisian professor André Mazon published a study on Balkan folklore, with four tales of The Beauty of the Earth, whose name he wrote down as lepinata zemiâtuj or lepinata zemjëtuj: La Chevrette Merveilleuse, Belle de la Terre, Les Trois Soeurs and Le Fils de L'Ourse.

French comparativist Emmanuel Cosquin, in his folklore analysis, cited her as La Belle de la Terre (the French translation of her name), in a tale collected by Holger Pedersen: a youth, son of a hunter, touches four pieces of flesh hanging from a tree; they reform into the Beauty of Earth, who explains she has been a captive of a "dark elf" for 10 years. Cosquin also quoted the tale where the Beauty of the Earth disguises herself in her "dark skin" and assumes another identity. The motif of the magical dress or garment also happens in a story where her suitor brings home to his mother the magical dress.

German albanologist Robert Elsie translated her name as "Earthly Beauty", in his book Albanian Folktales and Legends, and she appears in six tales of his compilation: The Youth and the Maiden with Stars on their Foreheads and Crescents on their Breasts, The three friends and the Earthly Beauty, The Boy and the Earthly Beauty, The Scurfhead (as a trio of Earthly Beauties living in an underground kingdom), The Stirrup Moor (as the true identity of the Moor and helper of the hero) and The King's Daughter and the Skull (as a fairy who disenchants the skull).

This character's name is translated as Schöne der Erde in German translations by linguist August Leskien, in his book of Balkan folktales: "Die Lubi und die Schöne der Erde", "Die Schöne der Erde", "Die neidischen Schwestern" (a variant of the ATU 707 tale type), and in "Die Nachtigall Gisar" (where she appears as the owner of the nightingale Gisar). She also appears in Das Haar der Schönen der Erde ("The Hair of the Beauty of the Earth"), in von Hahn's book of Albanian fairy tales, and in Die drei Gesellen, from author Gustav Meyer. Lucy Mary Jane Garnett translated Leskien's Albanian tale as The Liouvía and the Beauty of The Earth.

The Beauty of the Earth also appears in the tale Peshkatari dhe e Bukura e dheut ("The Fisherman and the Beauty of the World"), collected by Anton Çetta in his Përralla, Vol II, and in the compilation by Donat Kurti, in the story of "The Beauty of the Earth and the Shtriga" (e Bukura e dheut dhe shtriga).

Folklorist Anton Berisha published another Albanian language tale with the character, titled "Djali i vogël i padishajt dhe e bukura e dheut që bahesh skile".

=== In Greece ===
This mythological figure has been found in the Arvanitika dialect of Albanian, in Greece, with the name written in Greek derived script: Ε μπούκουρα ε δέουτ.

A character named "Beauty of the Land" appears in a fairy tale variant of the Aarne–Thompson–Uther Index 707, The Three Golden Children (The Dancing Water, the Singing Apple, and the Speaking Bird), collected in the village of Zagori, Epirus, by J. G. Von Hahn in his Griechische und Albanische Märchen (Leipzig, 1864), and analysed by Arthur Bernard Cook in his Zeus, a Study in Ancient Religion.

In the tale The Twin Brothers (tale type ATU 303, "The Twins or Blood Brothers"), published (as unsourced) by Andrew Lang in his The Grey Fairy Book and compiled by scholar Georgios A. Megas in his book Folktales of Greece, an old woman reveals that the infertility of a fisherman's wife can be cured by ingesting the flesh of a gold-fish, and after some should be given to her she-dogs and mares. Male twins are born, two foals and two puppies - each brother getting a hound and a horse. A pair of cypress trees also sprout in the fisherman's garden and act as their life token. When one of the twins leaves home, he arrives at a kingdom and tries to woo the princess of this kingdom, by performing three tasks for her father. The princess's name is given as "Fairest in the Land" in Lang's translation, and as "Beauty of the Country" in Megas's version. This tale was originally collected in German by Austrian consul Johann Georg von Hahn from Negades, Zagori. with the title Die Zwillingsbrüder. In Hahn's version, the princess is named "Schönen des Landes".

In another tale collected by Georgios A. Megas, The Navel of the Earth, a dying king makes his sons promise to wed his three sisters to whoever passes by their castle after his death. The youngest marries his sisters off, respectively, to a lame man, a one-eyed man and a man in rags. Later, he decides to win the "Beauty of the World" as his bride, despite her dangerous reputation.

=== In Italy ===
In the heroic tale "The Twins" (Albanian: Binoshët; Italian: I Gemelli) collected by Giuseppe Schirò in Piana degli Albanesi and published in his 1923 Canti tradizionali ed altri saggi delle colonie albanesi di Sicilia, e Bukura e Dheut is translated in Italian as "la Bella della Terra".

According to Albanologist Robert Elsie, Bernardo Bilotta, an Italian poet and writer of Arbëresh descent, has composed unpublished narrative poems with fairy tale motifs, based on the legend of "The Beauty of the Earth": E bukura e Jetës (La Bella del Mondo) (1894) and La Bella Gioia (1896).

== See also ==
- Albanian folk beliefs
- Zonja e Dheut

== Sources ==
=== Bibliography ===
- Bane, Theresa (2013). Encyclopedia of Fairies in World Folklore and Mythology. McFarland. ISBN 9781476612423.
- Çabej, Eqrem (1975). Studime gjuhësore: Gjuhë. Folklor. Letërsi. Diskutime (in Albanian). Vol. 5. Rilindja.
- Clouston, W. A. Variants and analogues of the tales in Vol. III of Sir R. F. Burton's Supplemental Arabian Nights. 1887. pp. 617–648.
- Cook, Arthur Bernard. Zeus, A Study In Ancient Religion. Cambridge University Press. 1925. Vol. II, Part I. Appendix F. pp. 1003–1019.
- Dedvukaj, Lindon (2023). "Linguistic evidence for the Indo-European and Albanian origin of Aphrodite". Proceedings of the Linguistic Society of America. 8 (1). Linguistic Society of America: 5500. doi:10.3765/plsa.v8i1.5500. S2CID 258381736.
- Demiraj, Bardhyl; Starostin, Sergei; Lubotsky, Alexander; de Vaan, Michiel. "The Albanian inherited lexicon" (Database).
- Folktales and Fairy Tales: Traditions and Texts from around the World. 2nd Edition. Vol I: A-F. Edited by: Anne E. Duggan and Donald Haase, with Helen J. Callow. Santa Barbara, California: Greenwood. 2016. pp. 22–23.
- Elsie, Robert (2001a). A Dictionary of Albanian Religion, Mythology and Folk Culture. London: Hurst & Company. ISBN 1-85065-570-7.
- Elsie, Robert (2001b). Albanian Folktales and Legends. Dukagjini Publishing House.
- Hahn, Johann Georg von. Griechische und albanesische Märchen. Leipzig: W. Engelmann. 1864.
- Fishta, Gjergj; Lambertz, Maximilian (1958). "Die Laute des Hochlandes (Lahuta e malcis)". Südosteuropäische Arbeiten. 51. R. Oldenbourg. ISSN 0933-6850.
- Halimi, Mehmet (1972). "Vëzhgime mbi të folmen e Moravës së Poshtme". Gjurmime Albanologjike. 1–4. Albanological Institute of Prishtina.
- Hyllested, Adam; Joseph, Brian D. (2022). "Albanian". In Olander, Thomas (ed.). The Indo-European Language Family : A Phylogenetic Perspective. Cambridge University Press. pp. 223–245. doi:10.1017/9781108758666. ISBN 9781108758666. S2CID 161016819.
- Lambertz, Maximilian (1922). Albanische Märchen (und andere Texte zur albanischen Volkskunde). Wien: A. Hölder.
- Lurker, Manfred (2005). The Routledge Dictionary of Gods and Goddesses, Devils and Demons. Routledge, Taylor & Francis. ISBN 0-203-64351-8.
- Lüthi, Max (1987). The Fairytale as Art Form and Portrait of Man. Translated by John Erickson. Indiana University Press. ISBN 0-253-32099-2.
- Leskien, August. Balkanmärchen aus Albanien, Bulgarien, Serbien und Kroatien. Jena, E. Diederichs. 1919.
- Mazon, André (1936). Documents, Contes et Chansons Slaves de l'Albanie du Sud (PDF). Bibliothèque d'Études Balkaniques. Vol. 5. Paris: Librarie Droz. Archived from the original (PDF) on 2011-08-14.
- Norris, Harry Thirlwall (1993). Islam in the Balkans: Religion and Society Between Europe and the Arab World. University of South Carolina Press. ISBN 0-87249-977-4.
- Noygues, Évelyne (2008). Les contes dans la culture albanaise: Le thème de l'emmurement à travers Marguerite Yourcenar et Ismail Kadaré. Orients - Bulletin de l’association des anciens élèves et amis des langues orientales. pp. 81–89.
- Poghirc, Cicerone (1987). "Albanian Religion". In Mircea Eliade (ed.). The Encyclopedia of Religion. Vol. 1. New York: MacMillan Publishing Co. pp. 178–180.
- Pojani, Dorina (2017). "Cities as story: Redevelopment projects in authoritarian and hybrid regimes" (PDF). Journal of Urban Affairs. 40 (5): 1–16. doi:10.1080/07352166.2017.1360737. S2CID 158909752.
- Sánchez Lizarralde, Ramón (2004). Ramón Sánchez Lizarralde (ed.). El agradecimiento del muerto: Cuentos populares albaneses. Translated by Ramón Sánchez Lizarralde. Alberdania: Alga Narrativa. ISBN 84-95589-96-6.
- Schirò, Giuseppe (1923). Canti tradizionali ed altri saggi delle colonie albanesi di Sicilia. Stab. tip. L. Pierro.
- Sedaj, Engjëll (1982). "Ngjashmëri të hyjnive homerike dhe atyre shqiptare". Gjurmime Albanologjike. Albanological Institute of Prishtina: 71–90.
- Ushaku, Ruzhdi (1988). "Mbi strukturën leksiko-semantike dhe etimologjike të tipit të togfjalëshit të shqipes burri i dheut (Mundësia për një rindërtim)". Gjurmime Albanologjike. 17–18. Albanological Institute of Prishtina: 63–76.
- Wheeler, G. Post (1936). Albanian Wonder Tales. New York: The Junior Literary Guild and Doubleday, Doran and Company, Inc. pp. 247–280.
