= The Tale of the Eagle =

Albanian folk tale

The flag of Albania features an eagle.

The Tale of the Eagle is an Albanian folk tale that explains how Albania and Albanians received their indigenous name.

== Tale ==
A youth was hunting in the mountains. An eagle flying above him alighted on top of a crag. The eagle was especially large and had a snake in its beak. After a while, the eagle flew away from the crag where it had its nest. The youth then climbed to the top of the crag where he saw, in the nest, an eaglet playing with the dead snake. However, the snake was not dead. Suddenly it stirred, revealed its fangs and was ready to pierce the eaglet with its deadly venom. The youth quickly took out his bow and arrow and killed the snake. Then he took the eaglet and started for his home. Suddenly the youth heard above him the loud whir of the great eagle's wings.

"Why do you kidnap my child?" cried the eagle.

"The child is mine because I saved it from the snake which you didn't kill," answered the youth.

"Give me back my child, and I will give you as a reward the sharpness of my eyes and the powerful strength of my wings. You will become invincible, and you will be called by my name!"

Thus the youth handed over the eaglet. After the eaglet grew, it would always fly above the head of the youth, now a grown man, who with his bow and arrows killed many wild beasts of the forest, and with his sword slew many enemies of the land. During all of these feats, the eagle faithfully watched over and guided him.

Amazed by the valiant hunter's deeds, the people of the land elected him king and called him Shqipëtar, which is to say Son of the Eagle (shqipe or shqiponjë is Albanian for eagle) and his kingdom became known as "Shqipëria" or Land of the Eagles.The two heads on the eagle represent the north and the south.

== See also ==
- Albanian mythology
- Totem
