= Princess Argjiro =

Princess Argjiro or Argyro (Albanian: Princesha Argjiro; Greek: Πριγγίπισα or Αρχόντισσα Αργυρώ) is a legendary figure in Albanian mythology. She is supposed to have lived in the 15th century.

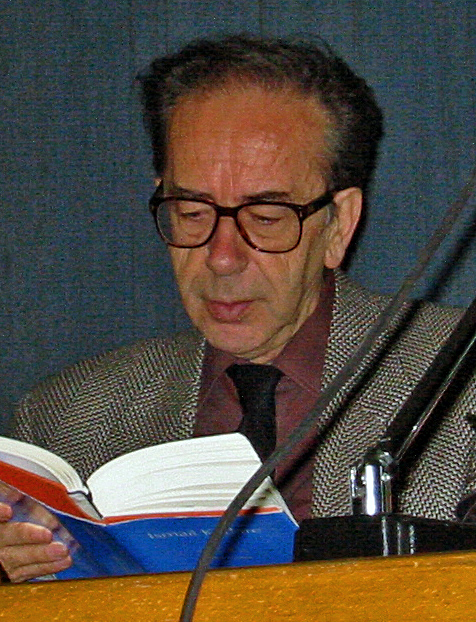
Ismail Kadare

Argjiro inspired Ismail Kadare in a poem he wrote in the 1960s. According to local Albanian folkloric traditions she lived in the 15th century and jumped off Gjirokastër Castle in the southern Albanian city of Gjirokastër, along with her child so as to avoid being captured by the Ottomans. Gjirokastër, located within historical Epirus takes its name from the Greek form Argyrokastro meaning silver castle and legend has it that the city was named for her, but the toponym long predates Princess Argjiro's time.

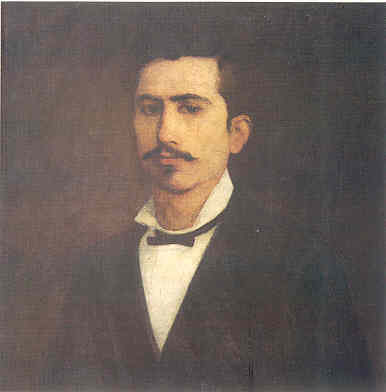
Kostas Krystallis

In Albanian tradition Princess Argyro or Argyri or Argyrini was a Byzantine princess and the eponymous founder of Gjirokastër. She built a castle there in the 15th century. Thus, the town is also known by some local Greeks as Castle of Argyro (Greek: Κάστρο της Αργυρούς). The tradition that she was the founder of Gjirokastër isn't in agreement with archaeologists today. Nevertheless, the settlement was most probably founded during the Byzantine period (5th-15th century). Greek author Alexandros Georgitsis states in 1885 that there were three sisters of royal blood: Gianno (Greek: Γιαννώ), Leno (Greek: Λενώ), and Argyro. Each princess became the eponymous founder of a town: Gianno of Gianna, Leno of Tepelenë and Argyro of Argyrokastro (modern Gjirokastër). Author Kostas Krystallis in his 1893 short novel Argyro the single-breasted (Greek: Αργυρώ η Μονοβύζα), describes that the castle of Argyro was besieged and taken by the Turks. However, Argyro's son, following his mother’s advice, had already escaped to nearby Sofratikë and then secretly moved to Kastaniani. There he was murdered by traitors. Argyro, when hearing the news of his death, was eager to take revenge. She finally managed to regain control of her castle and the surrounding region.
