= Constantin and Doruntinë =

Albanian ballad

Constantin and Doruntine (Albanian: Kostandini dhe Doruntina), or Constantin's Besa (Albanian: Besa e Kostandinit), is an Albanian ballad and legend. It is also narrated in a prose version. The legend has been narrated also:

- As a novel written by Ismail Kadare named in Albanian Who brought Doruntine back? (Albanian: Kush e solli Doruntinën?) and in the English version simply named Doruntine
- As a theatrical piece with the same title and based on Kadare's novel, put in scene by the National Theater of Albania in 1988. This was the version of Edmond Budina and Pirro Mani (People's Artist of Albania).

== Plot and Moral ==
Doruntine is the only daughter in a family with 13 children including herself. When Doruntine is asked in marriage by a foreign prince, everyone in the family disagrees to let her go so far away. Only Constantin, the youngest of Doruntine's twelve brothers, wants to make her happy and promises his mother that he will bring Doruntine back to see mother as soon as mother wants to. Eventually mother agrees to the marriage because of Constantin's promise.

At this point all twelve brothers agree to the marriage, but soon they all die in a war, Constantin included. Mother cannot bear the loss of all of her children and not having even her daughter close to her at an old age, her mourning too heavy to bear. Her monologue is full of pathos and anger. During her rage she curses her own dead son, Constantin, who made her a promise he could not keep.

At the curse, Constantin wakes up from death, becoming a lugat, and brings Doruntine back, because a mother's curse even after death, is worse than anything else. He finds Doruntine dancing during Easter time. Doruntine knew absolutely nothing about all 12 brothers being dead. Constantin tells her to come immediately with him and brings Doruntine back overnight on the back of his horse. She observes that he looks tired and that he is full of dust, but he tells her that it is because of the long trip. She cannot know that he is already dead. When they arrive back home, he leaves her at the door and tells her that he has to go to Church, but instead goes back to his grave.

Doruntine does not realize that she has travelled on his brother's horse when he was already dead, until she is told so by her mother.

The finale is breathtaking because of the shock of the two women who realize that Constantin has risen from the dead.

Kadare's version and the theatrical version is far more complicated and involves an investigator, named Stress, of the death who is also the narrator. He analyzes all the possibilities of this strange phenomenon, because no one can accept the rise from the dead. After many interviews with many people, he eventually comes to the conclusion that the Besa can overcome human life and death.

Kadare's thoughts on the legend, which stem from many of his books, are that the legend is pre-Christian, hence the rise from the dead motif.

== English translation ==
Robert Elsie has translated into English the ballad from the version of Margëlliç (modern Margariti), Chameria, called Kostandini e Dhoqina. The ballad is still sung in the area.

Scenes of the ballad depicted on postage stamps of Albania (1989).
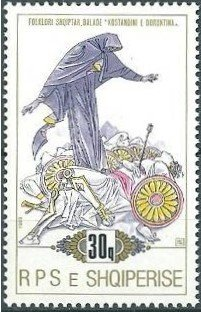
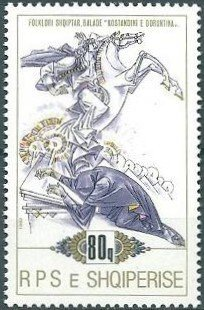
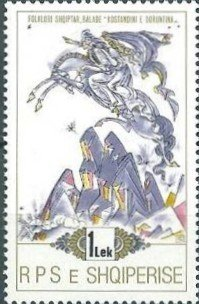
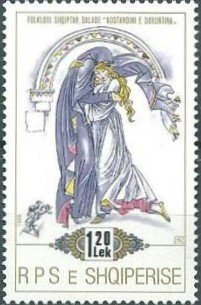

Long ago there was a mother

Who had nine sons and a daughter.

All the lads were dashing heroes

And the maid was called Dhoqina,

Just a young girl, still unmarried,

Agile was she like a goshawk.

From afar did come a missive

Asking for her hand in marriage,

But the brothers would not let her,

Only would the youngest of them,

Only Constantine accepted,

Days went by and months receded,

Then she went abroad to marry

Seven days she journeyed thither.

All the brothers then departed,

Travelled far to serve as soldiers

Fighting in a war with Russia,

All nine brothers fell in battle.

Left was but the widowed mother:

“Constantine, my son, where are you?

While alive, you made a promise,

This was what you said on parting:

‘Be I dead or be I living

I’ll return to you Dhoqina!’

Constantine, my son, where are you?

What now of your word of honour?”

Thus complained the widowed mother,

Longing for her distant daughter.

From the grave arose Constantine,

Tombstone turned into a stallion,

Graveyard soil became a saddle,

On his black horse did he clamber,

One by one he crossed the mountains

Swiftly, slowly did he journey,

Passing seven alpine ranges,

Seized his sister from her dancing:

“Oh Dhoqina, poor Dhoqina,

Do you not long for your family?

Tears are flowing down your mother’s

Face who cries to see her daughter.”

“Good or bad news are you bringing?”

“Come along now with me, sister,

As you are, dressed in those garments.”

O’er the horse's rump he pulled her

As the birds chirped in the mountains:

“Tsili viu, tsili viu,

Have you seen them, have you seen them,

Dead man riding with the living?”

Then Dhoqina asked her brother:

“Constantine, oh dearest brother,

What has happened, what’s the matter?

What’s that heavy smell that’s coming

Off your arms and mighty shoulders?”

“Smoke and powder from my rifle

For I’ve been at war, in battle.”

“Constantine, oh dearest brother,

What is in your hair that’s glaring,

Flaring that it almost blinds me?”

“Do not worry, my good sister,

Just the dust whirled from the highway.”

“Constantine, oh dearest brother,

What’s the matter with our house here,

Why has it been painted over,

Has perchance misfortune struck it?”

“Do not worry, fair Dhoqina,

It’s just mother who’s grown older.

She no longer liked the colours,

Thus she had the house repainted

Black as symbol of her aging,

Nothing more and nothing less,” he

Told her at their destination.

“Off the horse now, fair Dhoqina,

Go into the house, my sister,

I’ll be with you in a twinkling.”

Constantine flew off that instant

And returned unto his graveyard.

To the doorway strode Dhoqina,

“Open, mother, it’s Dhoqina!”

“Who is claiming she’s Dhoqina?

May a bolt of lightning strike you!

Who has led you to my doorway?

All my sons are gone and perished.”

“Open up the door, dear mother,

For I’ve come back with my brother,

Come with Constantine on horseback.”

“Constantine is gone and perished,

Fell upon the field of battle,

Withered, turned to dust his body.”

Then she opened up the door and

Saw her daughter on the threshold,

Both the women died that second.

== International Theatrical Version ==
According to a review by www.nytheatre.com, the story of Doruntine focuses around the Albanian idea of the Besa—essentially a person's most sacred oath; a promise that can never be broken. The review goes on to say that:

Doruntine is a wholly theatrical and moving telling of a very relevant and powerful story. It's a window into a culture not often heard from, and is yet another argument for the cultural importance of independent theatre.

In 2009 the drama was successfully shown in many theaters throughout the Balkans as per Jorgos Jakumis' translation. One of the most experienced and loved actresses of the National Theatre of Albania, Margarita Xhepa, People's Artist of Albania, returned on the scene after several years of absence just to interpret this drama.

== See also ==
- Albanian literature
- Albanian mythology
