= Pogonishte =

Pogonishte is a folk dance from Pogon in southern Albania. It is related to the Greek dance Pogonisios (Greek: Πωγωνίσιος) or Sta Dyo (Greek: Στα Δύο). The time signature is in 2/4, and it is danced in an open circle; dancers bounce twice gently on every count.
