= Song of Tana =

The Song of Tana is an Albanian folk ballad. It is considered one of the songs with the most variants in Albanian music.

== History ==
According to folklorist Qemal Haxhihasani the song is related with the notion of the art of music. Ramadan Sokoli, one of the most prominent ethnomusicologists of the Balkans associated the song with the belief among past fyell players that the echo of the fyell had a positive influence on the herds.

== Name ==
Generally the song is known as the Herders’ Song (Albanian: Këngë barinjsh). In southern Albania it is known as the Song of Tana (Albanian: Kënga e Tanës), while in northern Albania and Kosovo it is known as the Song of the Shepherdess (Albanian: Kajka e çobaneshës).

== Song ==
In Albania there have been recorded about 70 variants from the regions of Berat, Dibër, Elbasan, Fier, Gjirokastër, Gramsh, Kolonjë, Korçë, Kukës, Lushnjë, Pogradec, Skrapar, Tepelenë and Vlorë. Outside Albania the song is found among the Albanians of Kosovo, the Arvanites of Euboea, southern Greece and the Cham Albanians of northwestern Greece (Çamëria). The Song of Tana can be sung as a polyphonic or monophonic song a cappella or with instrumental accompaniment.

== See also ==
- Music of Albania
