= Dollia =

Albanian cultural tradition of toasting

Dollia (Toast) is a traditional custom in Albania, consisting of raising and clinking glasses during family or social gatherings. It is observed on occasions such as weddings, anniversaries, and other celebrations.

== Origin and history ==
Dollia has been passed down through generations and is believed to have medieval roots. The practice is found mainly in southern Albania, particularly in Skrapar, Përmet, Gramsh, Berat, and the Labëria region.

== Use and social role ==
Dollia is a feature of Albanian hospitality and is used to acknowledge guests, relatives, or friends. The host often begins with the call: "A do miq o i zoti i shtëpisë?" ("Friends, shall we?"), to which the guests respond before raising their glasses.

Male participants are traditionally expected to follow the rules of dollia. The custom is closely associated with rakia, as expressed in the saying: "If you mention dolli, you have mentioned rakia."

== Rules and rituals ==
At the table, a dollibashi is appointed, usually one of the senior participants, who guides the ritual. The dollibashi addresses the guests with: "Të kam gjetur, mirësia e parë e të zotit të shtëpisë." ("I have found you, the first courtesy of the host.") Participants are expected to drink the full glass; those who do not may be excluded from the table.

After the first toast, the person addressed by the dollibashi replies: "Urdhër dollibash" ("As you command, dollibashi"), continuing the ritual. Each individual mentioned by the dollibashi is required to raise their glass. The order of toasting generally follows a hierarchy, with the second most important person at the table drinking after the dollibashi, followed by others.

== Regional variations ==
Local variations of dollia exist across Albania. In Skrapar it is known as zabërzan, in Gramsh as sulovarçe, while in the Mokra area the custom is observed in a more formal way.

== Cultural recognition ==
On 22 July 2025, the Ministry of Economy, Culture, and Innovation declared dollia a National Cultural Heritage of Albania.

According to the scholar Sherif Bundo, author of the monograph *Dollia shqiptare, institucioni shqiptar i mikpritjes*, the tradition is most widespread in southern Albania, particularly in Skrapar, Përmet, Tepelenë, Mallakastër, Berat, Gramsh, Librazhd, Pogradec, Devoll, and Kolonjë, though it is also practiced in northern areas such as Pukë.
