= Oda (Albania) =

Traditional guest room of Albanians

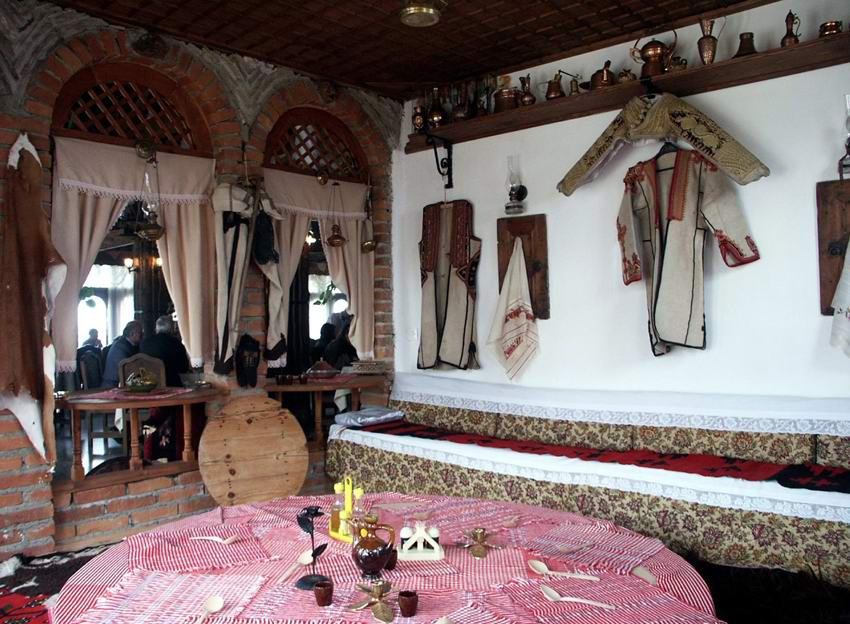
A typical Oda

Oda is a typical large room in an Albanian traditional house used by the host to receive and entertain the guests.

== Usage ==
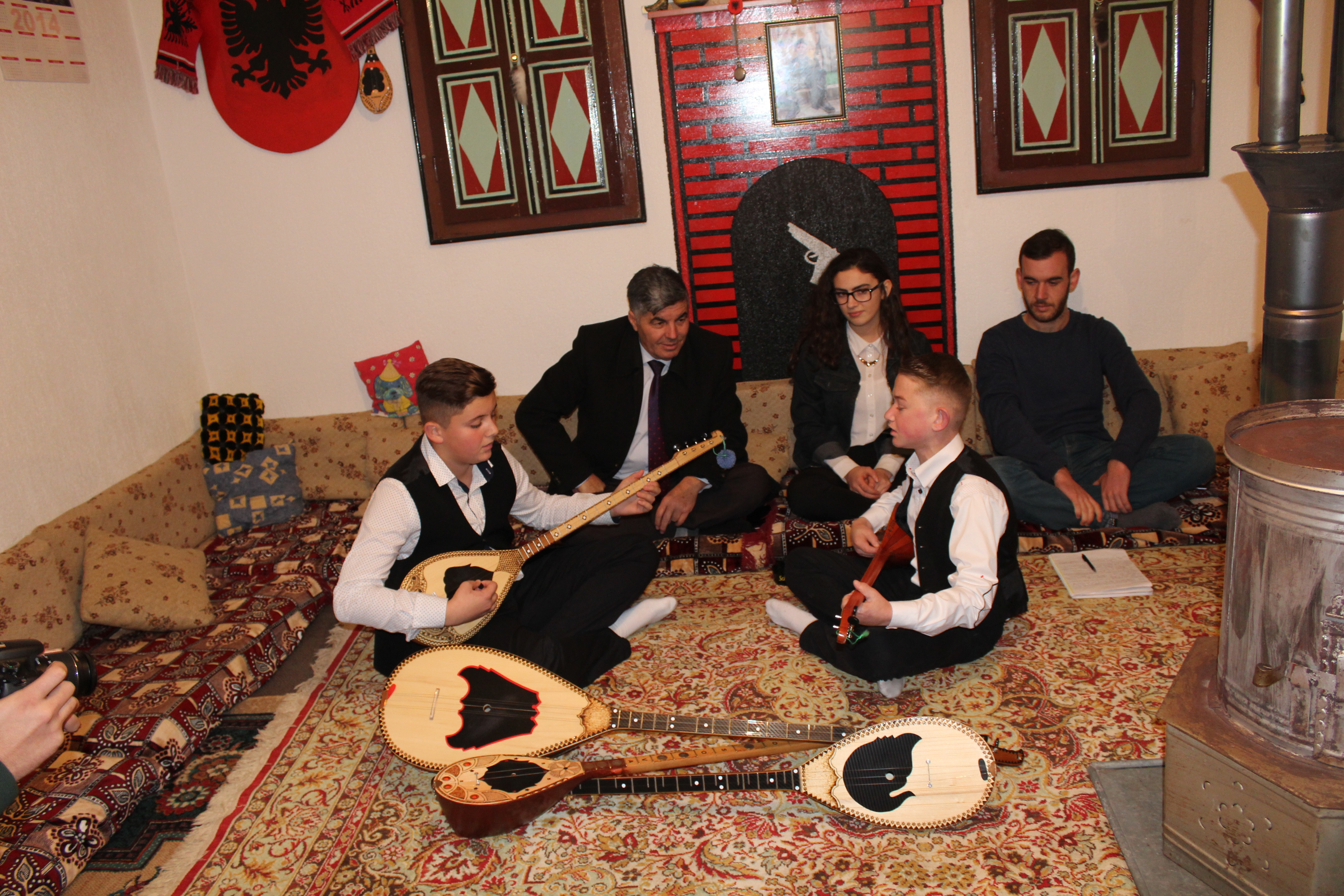
Musicians in Kosovo play çifteli and sharki lutes in Oda

Oda are used by the host to receive and entertain the guests. Traditionally, the host and the guests in the oda are old men and married men. Till the end of the 20th century, women and young boys were not allowed to enter the room. In the oda, the men talk, take political discussions and sing epic songs until late hours. During an oda "session", historical events and traditions are transmitted orally through discussions and songs.

In the odas, knowledge were handed down the generations through epic tales and ballads. During 19th and 20th century—in order to counter the Turkish and Serbian bans on Albanian language—odas were secretly used for teachings in Albanian. In Yugoslavian Kosovo many odas were transformed into classrooms and home-schools to resume and conserve Albanian education.

== Sources ==
- Kostovicova, Denisa (2005). Kosovo: The Politics of Identity and Space. Routledge. ISBN 0-415-34806-4.
- Lanzinger, Margareth (2006). Women's Movements: Networks and Debates in Post-communist Countries in the 19th and 20th Centuries. Böhlau Verlag Köln, Weimar, Wien. ISBN 3-412-32205-9.
