= Auguste Dozon =

French scholar and diplomat

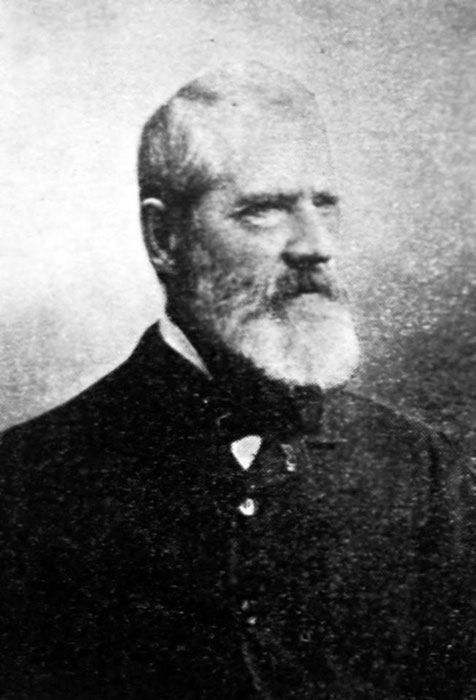
Auguste Dozon 1

Auguste Dozon (2 August 1822 – 31 December 1890) was a French scholar and diplomat, known for his work on Albanian language and folklore.

== Life ==
Dozon was born in Chalons Sur Marne on 22 August 1822. He studied ancient and modern literature in Collège Sainte-Barbe in Paris. After graduating as a lawyer, he worked in the French Ministry of Interior and then transferred into Foreign Services. Between 1854 and 1885 he was French consul in many cities in the Western Balkans, namely in Belgrade, Mostar, Plovdiv, Ioannina, and Thessaloniki.

Particularly interested in the Albanian language, which he learned, Dozon poured his research into Manuel de la langue Shkipe, ou albanaise (Handbook of the Shkipe or Albanian language, Paris 1879), as well as Contes albanais, recueillis et traduits (Albanian Folk Tales, Collected and Translated, Paris 1881).
