= Gjirokastër Fortress =

Fort in Gjirokastër, Albania

- Kalaja e Gjirokastrës or Kalaja e Argjirosë
- Gjirokastër, Southern Albania
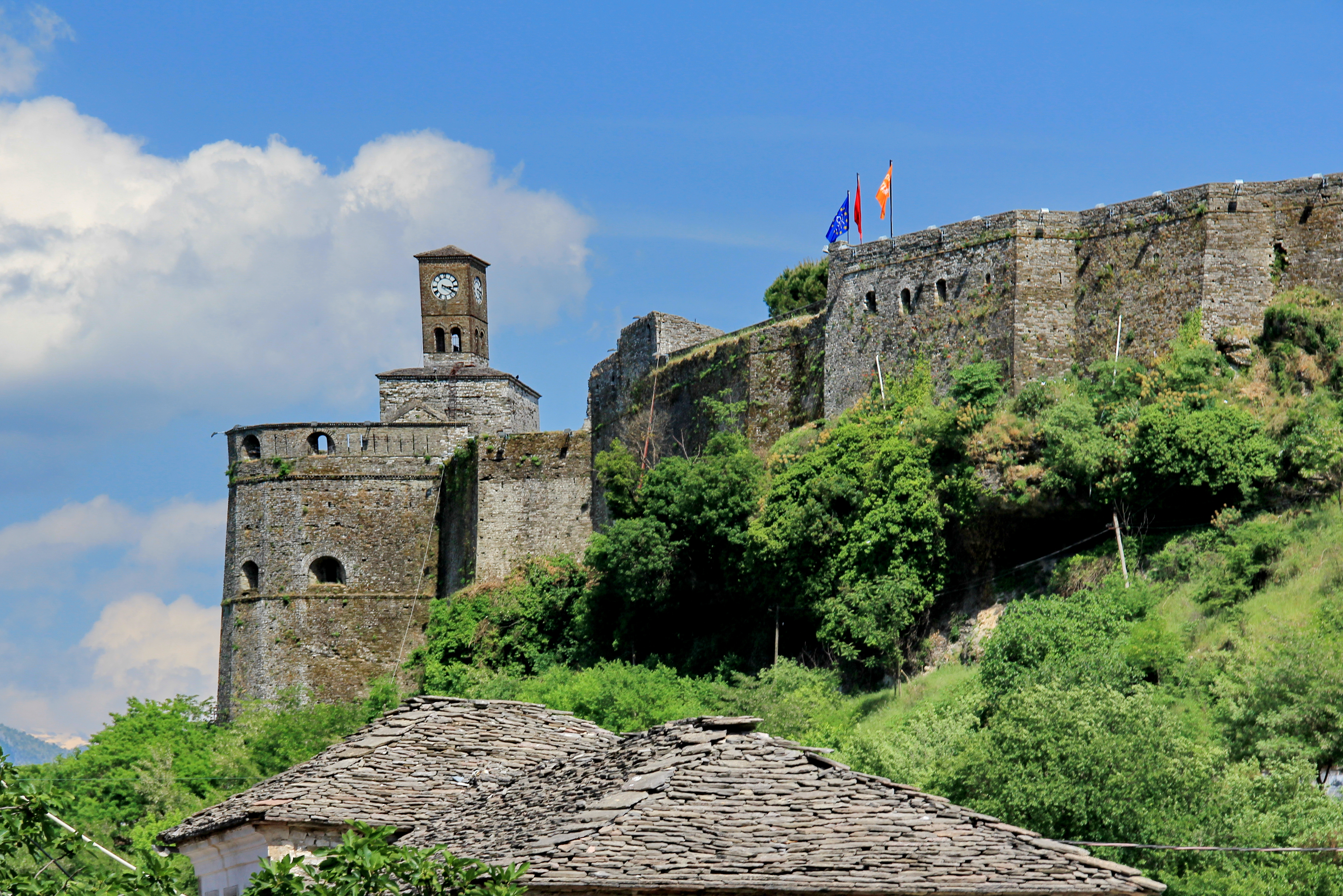
- Gjirokastër Castle

Site information
- Owner: Albania
- Controlled by: Byzantine Empire; Despotate of Epirus; Zenevisi family Ottoman Empire; Albania
- Open to the public: Yes

Location
- Location within Albania
- Coordinates: 40.074°N 20.141°E

Site history
- Built: 12th Century CE
- Materials: Ancient blocks

Gjirokastër Castle (Albanian: Kalaja e Gjirokastrës or Kalaja e Argjirosë) is a fortress in Gjirokastër, Albania, known historically during Ottoman rule as Ergiri (while Greeks referred to it as Argyrokastro, a name applied also to the castle) which also includes a Bektashi türbe (or tyrbe). Gjirokastër Castle is situated at a height of 336 metres (1,102 ft). It dominates the town and overlooks the strategically important route along the river valley.

The castle is a well-known tourist attraction and a venue for cultural events, contributing to the preservation and promotion of the region’s historical heritage. Today it possesses five towers and houses, the new Gjirokastër Museum, a clock tower, two tekes, a cistern, the stage of the National Folk Festival, and many other points of interest.

== History ==
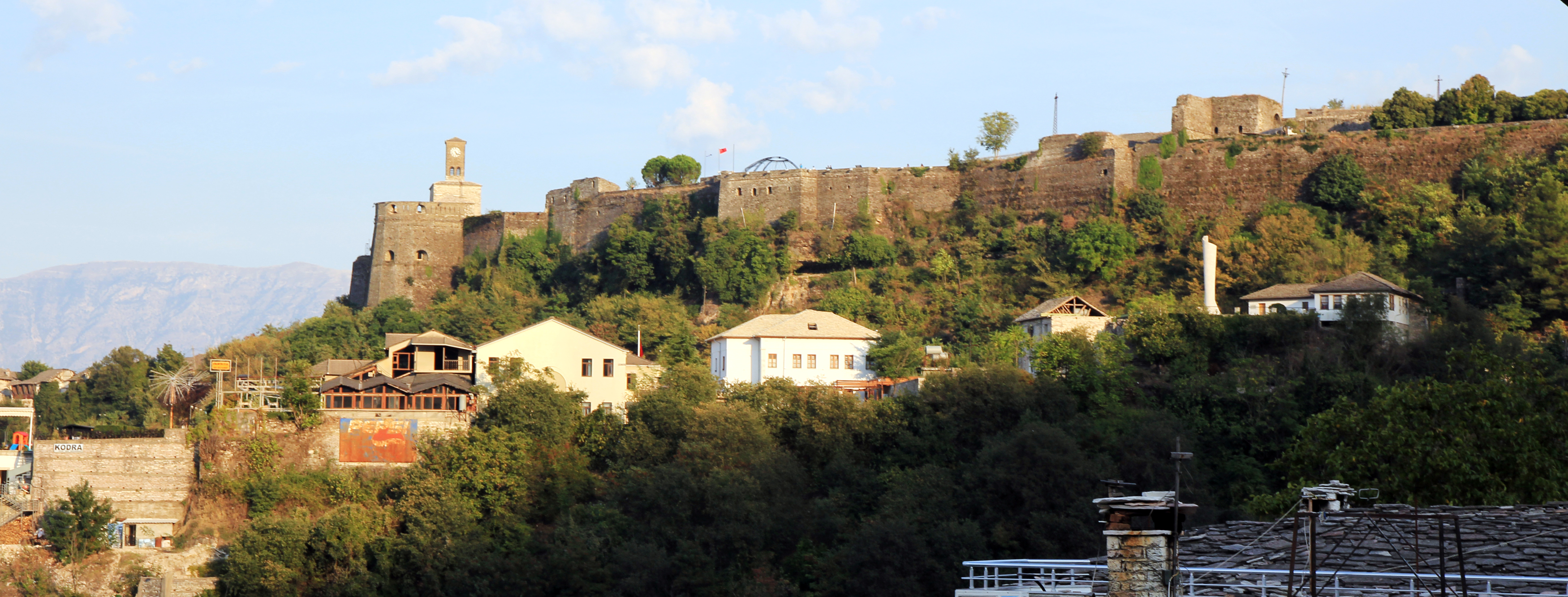
Panoramic view of Gjirokastër Castle

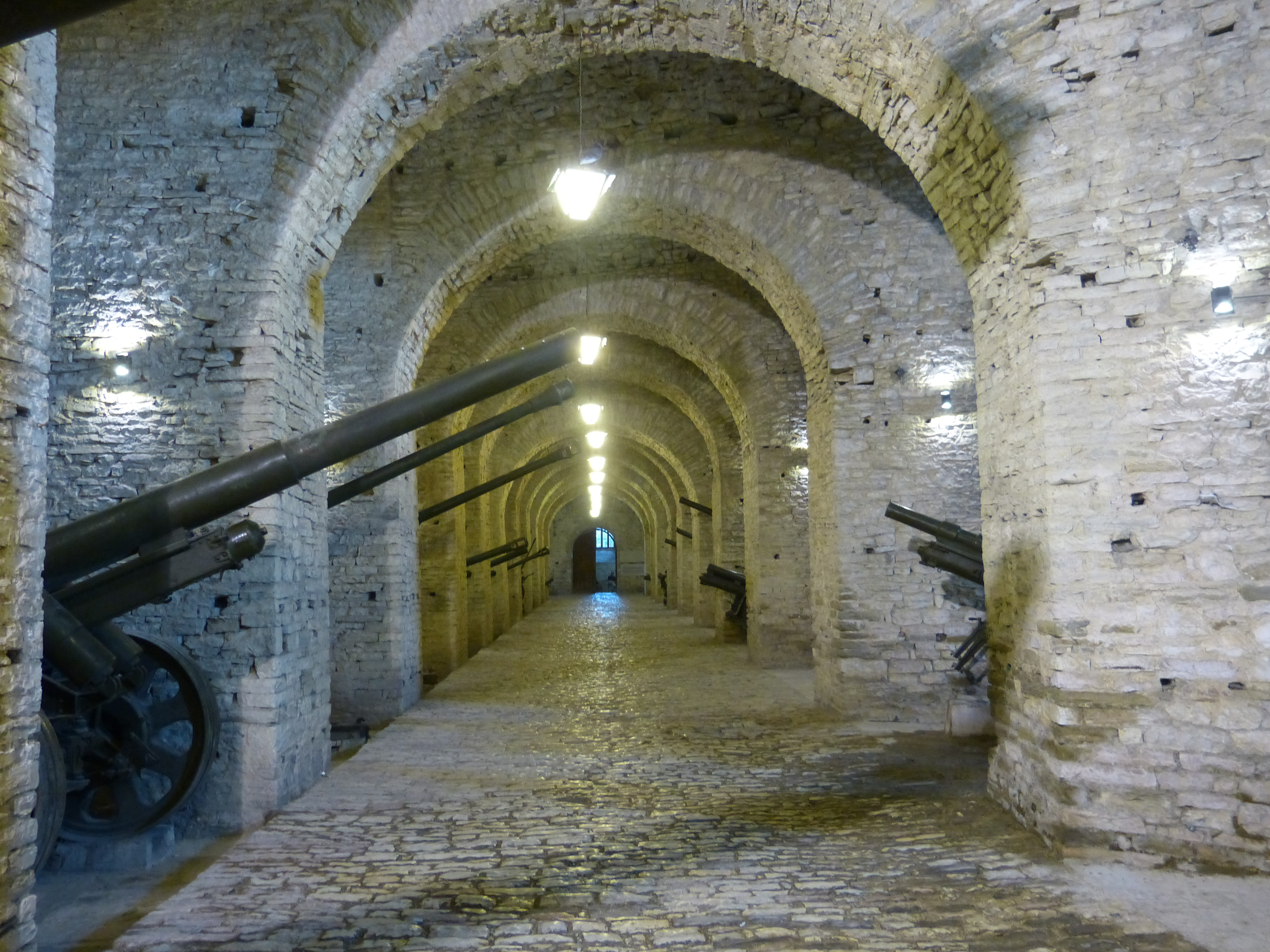
Hall inside castle

Former prison

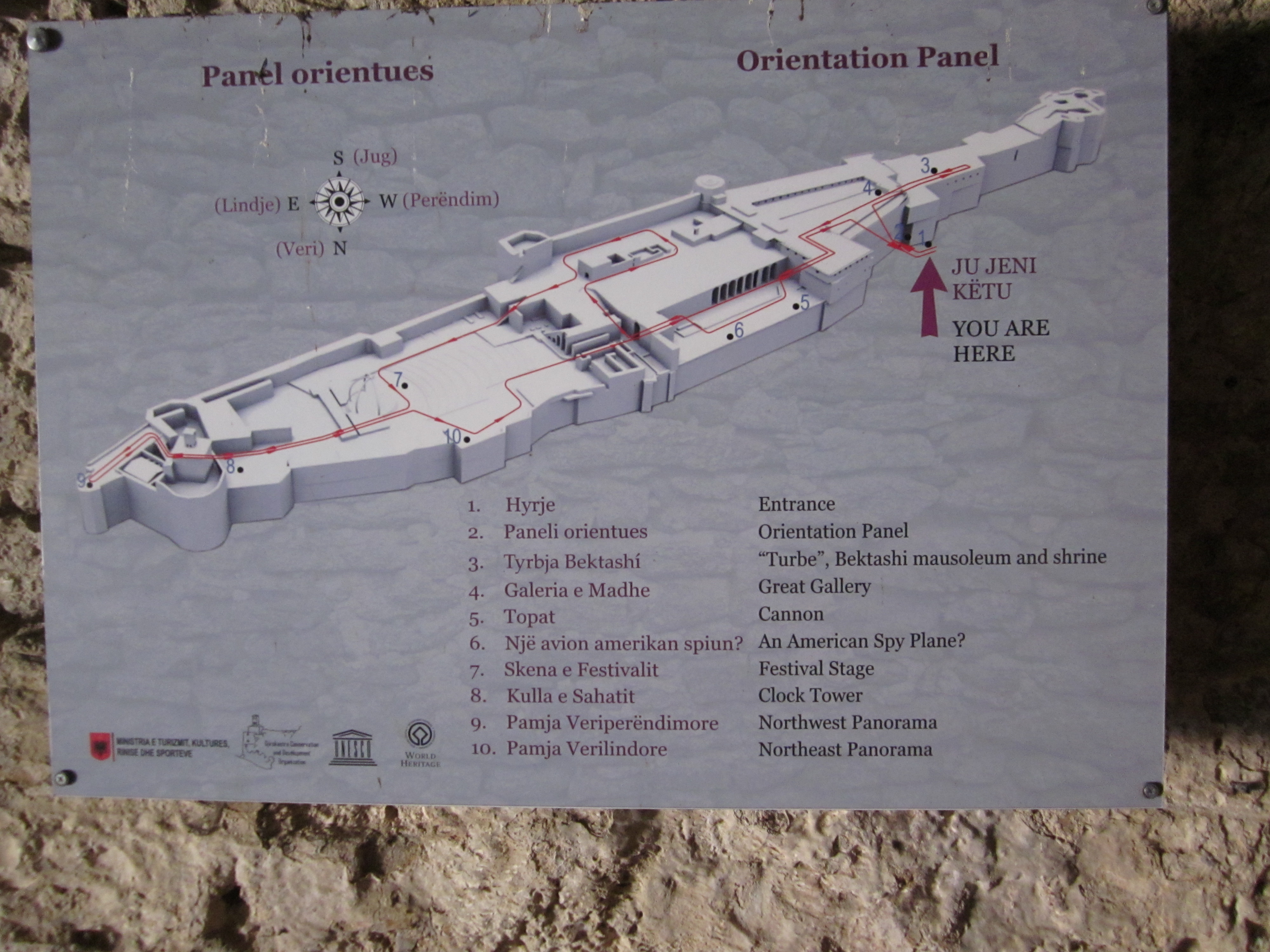
Map of the castle

The citadel existed in various forms since before the 12th century. Princess Argjiro inspired Albanian author Ismail Kadare in a poem he wrote in the 1960s. According to local Albanian folkloric traditions she lived in the 15th century and jumped off Gjirokastër Castle along with her child so as to avoid being captured by the Ottomans.

Over the centuries, it has served various functions, including the defense of the city and administrative uses.

Extensive renovations and a westward addition was added by Ali Pasha of Tepelene after 1812. The government of King Zog expanded the castle prison in 1932. The castle's prison was used extensively by Zog's government and housed political prisoners during the Communist regime.

The castle is under protection from UNESCO.

== Tourism ==
The Gjirokastër Castle has also been a special destination for tourists. It is one of the most important historical monuments in Albania and represents a significant example of military architecture in the Balkans. It is open to visitors and contains a military museum featuring captured artillery and memorabilia of the Communist resistance against German occupation, as well as a captured United States Air Force plane to commemorate the Communist regime's struggle against the Western powers.

=== Visitor numbers ===
Gjirokastër Castle was visited by over 10,000 Albanian and foreign tourists during January – May 2018. This was over double the visitors from the same period the year before, which saw 4,700 visitors.

Total Visitors
Period	Visitors
January – May 2017	5,400
January – May 2018	over 10,000

== See also ==
- Gjirokastër
- List of castles in Albania
- Tourism in Albania
