= Dheu =

The Earth in Albanian paganism

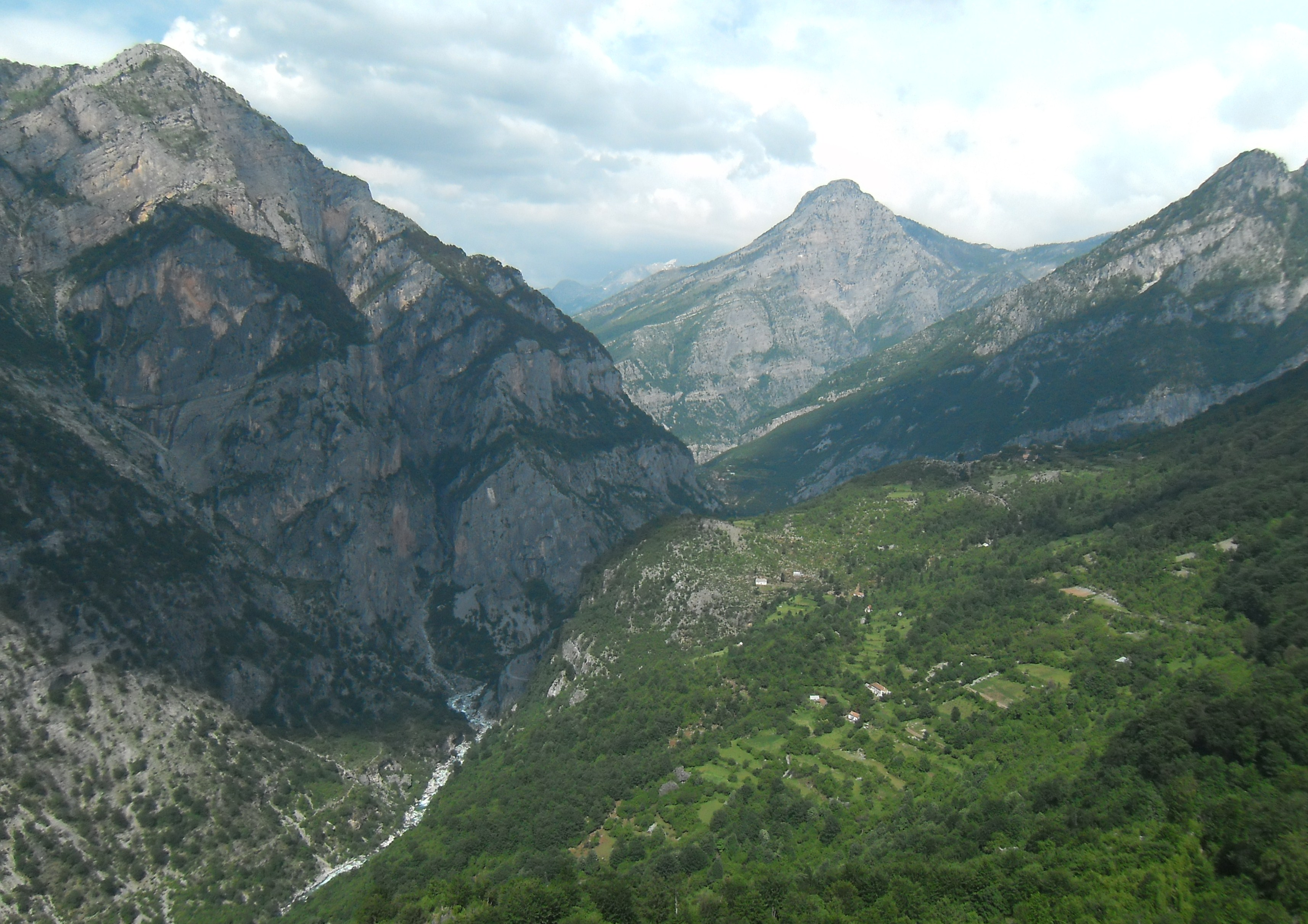
An instance of the Albanian worship of the Mother Earth is the veneration and deep respect that the people of Kelmend dedicate to her. For them environment is of great importance, and they are deeply attached to their territory, maintaining a balance that involves material aspects as well as cultural and spiritual aspects.

Dheu (Albanian indefinite form: Dhé), the Earth, is the object of a special cult, important oaths, and curse formulas in Albanian paganism.

The Earth Mother Goddess or Great Mother (Magna Mater) is simply referred to as Dhé or Dheu in Albanian, and traces of her worship have been preserved in Albanian tradition. The Albanian noun Toka "The Earth" is also used to refer to the living Earth.

Zonja e Dheut (also Gheg Albanian: Zôja e Dheut) is used in Albanian to refer to the Earth Goddess.

== Name ==
=== Attestation ===
The Albanian theonyms Zonja e Dheut and Dheu are attested as early as 1635, in the Dictionarium latino-epiroticum [Latin-Albanian dictionary] by Frang Bardhi, as the Albanian rendering of the Roman Earth Goddess Tellus, Dea and Mater Magna, respectively.

The Albanian word for earth – dhé, in its Proto-Albanian form ðē(h), is considered to have been attested in antiquity: the Ancient Greek (Doric) word δῆ that appears in the expression "δῆ · γῆ και σιωπᾷ" ("earth and keeps silence"), which was recorded in the lexicon compiled by Hesychius of Alexandria (5th century AD), is considered to be an ancient loanword from Proto-Albanian. Some of the Proto-Albanian glosses in Hesychius could date back as early as the 7th century BCE.

=== Etymology ===
Zonja e Dheut (also Gheg Albanian: Zôja e Dheut) literally translates as "the Goddess of the Earth".

In Albanian, capitalized Zonja or Zôja is used for "Goddess", "Lady", while uncapitalized zonja or zôja is used for "lady" or "mistress". It is similar to Zot "God", "Lord", zot "lord" (cf. the Albanian sky-god Zoj-z, and its possible epithet Zot "Sky Father" from Proto-Albanian *dźie̅u ̊ a(t)t-, ultimately from Proto-Indo-European *Dyḗus ph₂tḗr). The term is similarly used for Zôja Prende "Goddess/Lady Prende", also referred to as Zôja e Bukuris "Goddess/Lady of Beauty".

Albanian Dheu "The Earth" is the definite form of dhé "earth", ultimately stemming from Proto-Indo-European *dʰéǵʰōm "earth"; e Dheut is the Albanian definite genitive case of dhé.

=== Epithets ===
The Earth-goddess was represented with the epithet "mother" in most Indo-European traditions. In Albanian tradition mëmë-dheu is used for "mother earth" in sacred contexts. A common Indo-European mythological epithet for the earth is "dark", which is also reflected in the Albanian phrase dhé të zi "black earth", appearing in Albanian folk-songs.

== History ==
The absence of any single and specific theonymic root for the "earth" in the various branches of the Indo-European language family, might be due to the predominance held by earth mother goddess cults already extant and profoundly rooted among Pre-Indo-European-speaking peoples encountered by incoming Indo-European-speaking peoples.

The confrontation between the belief systems of Pre-Indo-European populations—who favored "Mother Earth Cults" comprising earthly beliefs, female deities and priesthood—and of Indo-European populations who favored 'Father Heaven Cults' comprising celestial beliefs, male deities and priesthood, in the Albanian tradition might be reflected by the dichotomy of matriarchy and patriarchy that emerges from the two types of female warriors/active characters in Albanian epic poetry, in particular in the Kângë Kreshnikësh. Indeed, in Albanian epics there are on the one hand female characters who play an active role in the quest and the decisions that affect the whole tribe, on the other hand those who undergo a masculinization process as a condition to be able to participate actively in the fights according to the principles of the Kanun, the Albanian traditional customary law.

The fact that dhé "earth" is an Albanian inherited word from Proto-Indo-European, with ritualization in sacred contexts preserving its stability and density, highlights the important role of the earth in Albanian culture. Very serious Albanian oath swearings taken by earth, and many curse formulas based on the earth, also show the great significance of the earth cult in Albanian tradition.

== Cult, practices and folk beliefs ==
=== Living Earth ===
According to old Albanian beliefs that have been preserved by the Arbëneshë of Zara (Zadar, present-day Croatia), nxiri is a concept referring to all-seeing eyes that look at humans from the ground following their movements everywhere, and it is considered to be the sight of the living Earth. Some people believe that water is to the living Earth what blood is to the humans.

=== Mother Earth ===
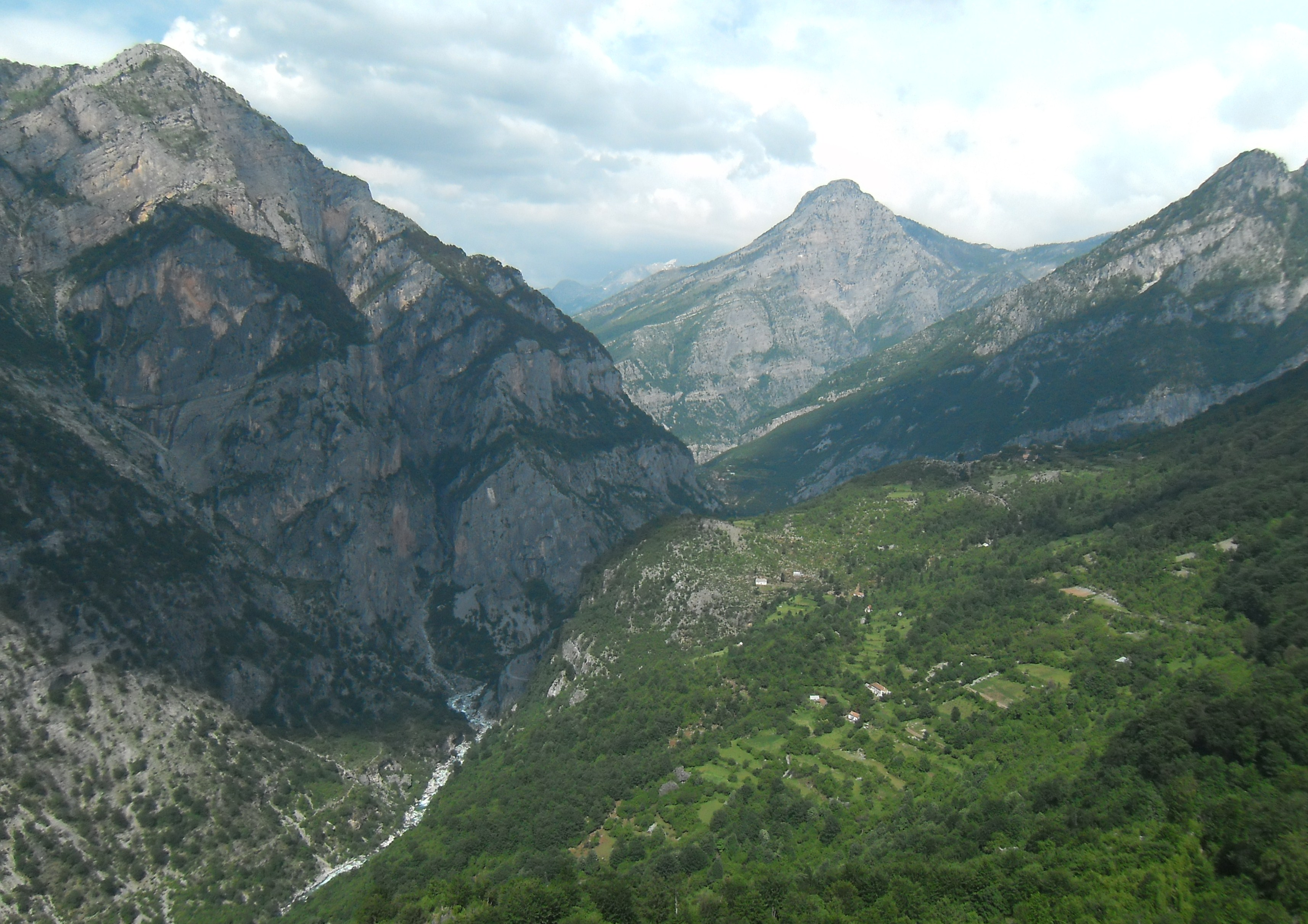
View from Brojë into the valley of Vukël and Nikç, Kelmend, northern Albania.

For the inhabitants of Kelmend, environment is of great importance, and they are deeply attached to their territory, considering it as Mother Earth. They venerate her and dedicate her deep homage at every moment and through every action, showing deep respect to both natural landscapes and animals. This balance involves material aspects as well as cultural and spiritual aspects.

According to an old Albanian custom, when an Albanian migrates to a foreign land, he takes with him a bag of earth of the "mother earth" (Alb. baltë mëmë-dheu), which in case the emigrant dies abroad, would be thrown on the grave, so that the earth would be light to the dead person.

==== Female ancestor and maternal breasts ====
A reflection of the worship of the earth mother goddess in Albanian folk beliefs is the cult of the maternal breasts. Considered as a symbol of fertility, breasts are reproduced on wooden or stone gates in Albanian houses. One of the heaviest type of oath swearing (Alb. be e rëndë) is taken by one's mother's breasts. A taboo forbids Albanians to hit the earth, because it would be like "hitting a dead mother's breasts". This expression is always said in such cases, regardless of the fact that people who pronounce it might have the mother alive or dead, which represents an analogy between the earth as the source of life for humans, and the mother likewise as the source of life for humans with childbirth and her breast. It also reflects the cult of the ancestors from the perspective of the milk or maternal line (Alb. lisi i tamlit or gjini bashkë, according to the Kanun, the Albanian traditional customary law). When a woman with many children dies, northern Albanian tradition requires that her relatives kiss her naked breasts.

In Albanian culture the original female ancestor of the kin group (Alb. fis or farë) is referred to as the "mother of the home" representing the Great Mother, and she is often imagined as a serpent (see Vitore and Nëna e Vatrës). The serpent is a sacred animal totem of the Albanians. Regarded as an earth-deity, the serpent is euphemistically called with names that are derived from the Albanian words for earth, dhé and tokë: Dhetokësi, Dheu, Përdhesi, Tokësi or Itokësi.

==== Maternal breasts, immurement and building ====
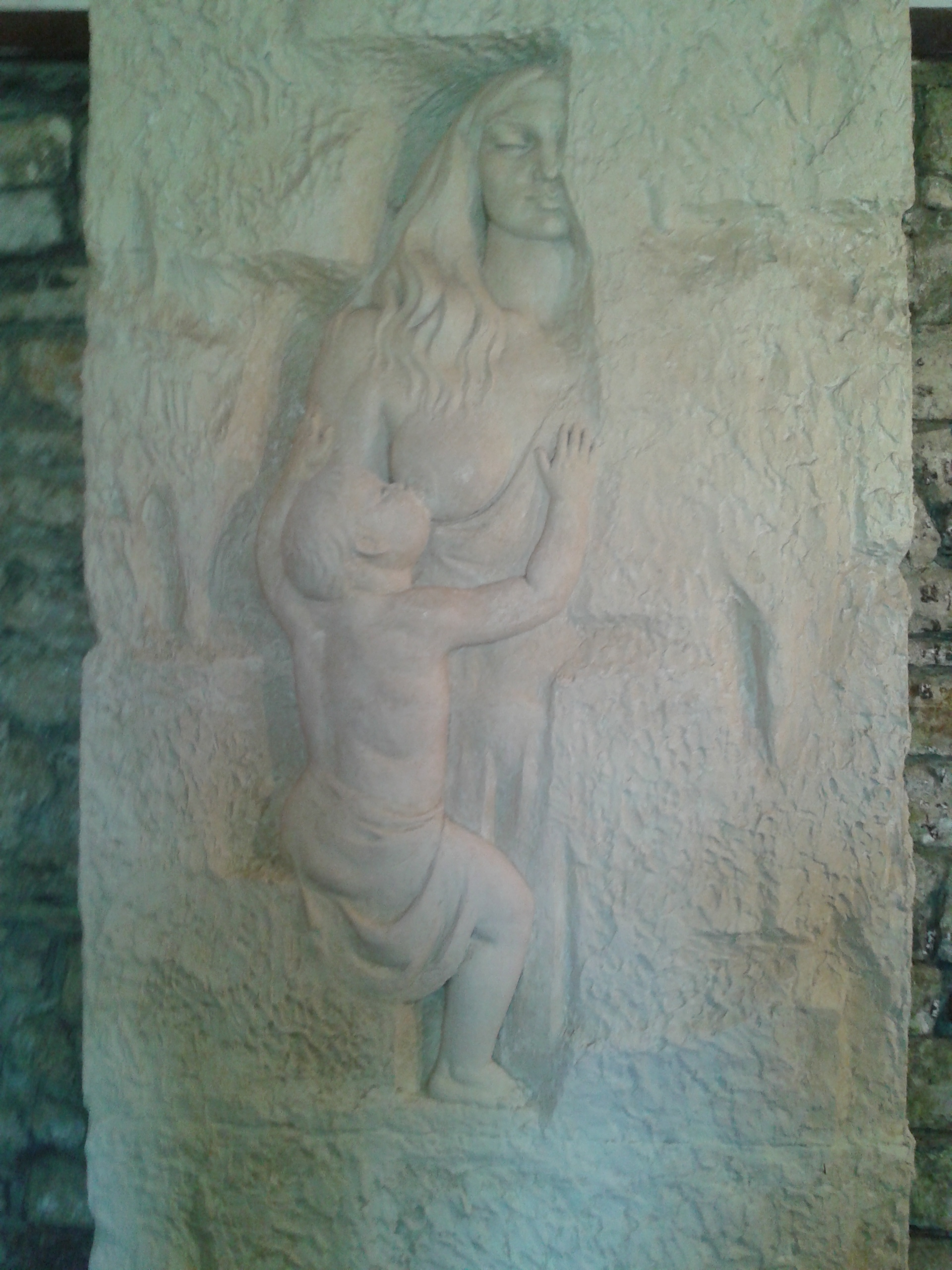
Life sized sculpture by Skender Kraja, based on the Legend of Rozafa, Museum of Rozafa Castle, Shkodër. The cult of the maternal breasts and the motif of immurement are reflections of the worship of the earth mother goddess in Albanian folk beliefs.

The cult of the earth is manifested in animal sacrifices for new buildings, a pagan practice widespread among Albanians. At the beginning of the construction of the new house, the foundation traditionally starts with prayers, in a 'lucky day', facing the Sun (Dielli), starting after sunrise, during the growing Moon (Hëna), and an animal is slaughtered as a sacrifice. The practice continues with variations depending on the Albanian ethnographic area. For instance in Opojë the sacrificed animal is placed on the foundation, with its head placed towards the east, where the Sun rises. In Brataj the blood of the sacrificed animal is poured during the slaughter in the corner that was on the east side, where the Sun rises; in order for the house to stand and for good luck, the owner of the house throws silver or golden coins in the same corner of the house; the lady of the house throws there unwashed wool. These things are to remain buried in the foundation of the house that is being built. The relatives of the house owner throw money on the foundation of the house as well, but that money is taken by the craftsman who builds the house. In Dibra a ram is slaughtered at the foundation, and the head of the ram is placed on the foundation. In the Lezha highlands a ram or a rooster is slaughered on the foundation and then their heads are buried there; the owners of the house throw coins as well as seeds of different plants on the foundation.

The cult of the earth mother goddess is also reflected in the renowned Balkan motif of immurement, a practice that according to legend is required to ensure the accomplishment of the construction of a building by sacrificing the wife of the chief builder. This motif is documented in Albanian legends about the construction of the strongholds of Shkodër (Rozafa Castle#Legend), Dibër, and Berat, but also in regions like Mirditë or Malësia e Madhe. In the Albanian legends, the woman who is to be immured in the building accepts to be sacrificed, but worried about her infant son, she makes the request to leave one of her breasts unwalled, so that she can nurse her son, the castle will stand and the son will enjoy it, becoming brave and winning battles in it. People regard the lime water that flows from the walls of these buildings as the milk of the immured woman, and it is utilized as medicine to apply to the breasts of the nursing women believing that this practise would increase their milk supply.

==== Spring, renewal of nature and soil fertility ====
Celebrated during the days around the spring equinox (Albanian Dita e Verës), the renewal of nature is associated with the cult of the Great Mother Goddess. Albanians celebrate it with several rites and customs, in particular wood or anything from vegetation cannot be cut, and the earth is considered to be "pregnant" (Alb. me barrë) and cannot be worked.

On the occasion of the beginning of ploughing the wheat field, a chicken is slaughtered on the tail of the plough. The head of the chicken is mixed with the seed and the earth obtained from the first pass of the ploughing. Animal sacrifices are made for soil fertility and production, prosperity, health of the animals, etc.

According to an old Albanian custom practiced until recently in various villages in Tomorr, Mirdita, and perhaps also in other areas, from the middle of May families with a lot of cattle slaughtered young cattle as sacrifices in order to make the earth fertile, so that the cattle would not be harmed during the summer and would have abundant milk during the harvest time in the mountains. Such a ritual burial ceremony was also found among other Balkan peoples, and it has been interpreted as a trace of the cult of an agricultural deity, for it was a sacrifice that allowed the renewal of the products of the soil, giving force to the vegetation of the fields, trees and vines.

A sacred ritual called "funeral of the Sun's Mother" was dedicated to the Albanian mother goddess Nëna e Diellit. It consisted in burying a female figure that probably personified a seasonal phase of the mother goddess. Occurring at the end of May, it was the last festival of the spring cycle, coinciding with the feast of Pentecost (Rusica). It was very widespread in southeastern Albania until the 20th century.

==== Ritual of death and rebirth ====
The cult of the earth is clearly manifested in an old Albanian ritual of death and rebirth, practiced especially in sick children in the Albanian Alps, particularly in Malësia e Madhe, and also in Kosovo. It was believed that by being buried, children would receive strength from the earth, becoming resistant to diseases. According to the custom, the sick child is taken by an old woman, who performs this archaic "healing" magical practice by covering the body of the child with earth, but leaving the head outside. The child is left there for a while, accompanied by the old woman who pronounces some sacred words and formulas. After these actions, the mother takes her baby, gathers all the clothes of her child together with some other equipment in the cradle, then she goes away and has to cross three streams of water. Afterwards the mother washes the clothes and returns home, not talking to anyone she might meet on the way.

=== Final dwelling of humans ===
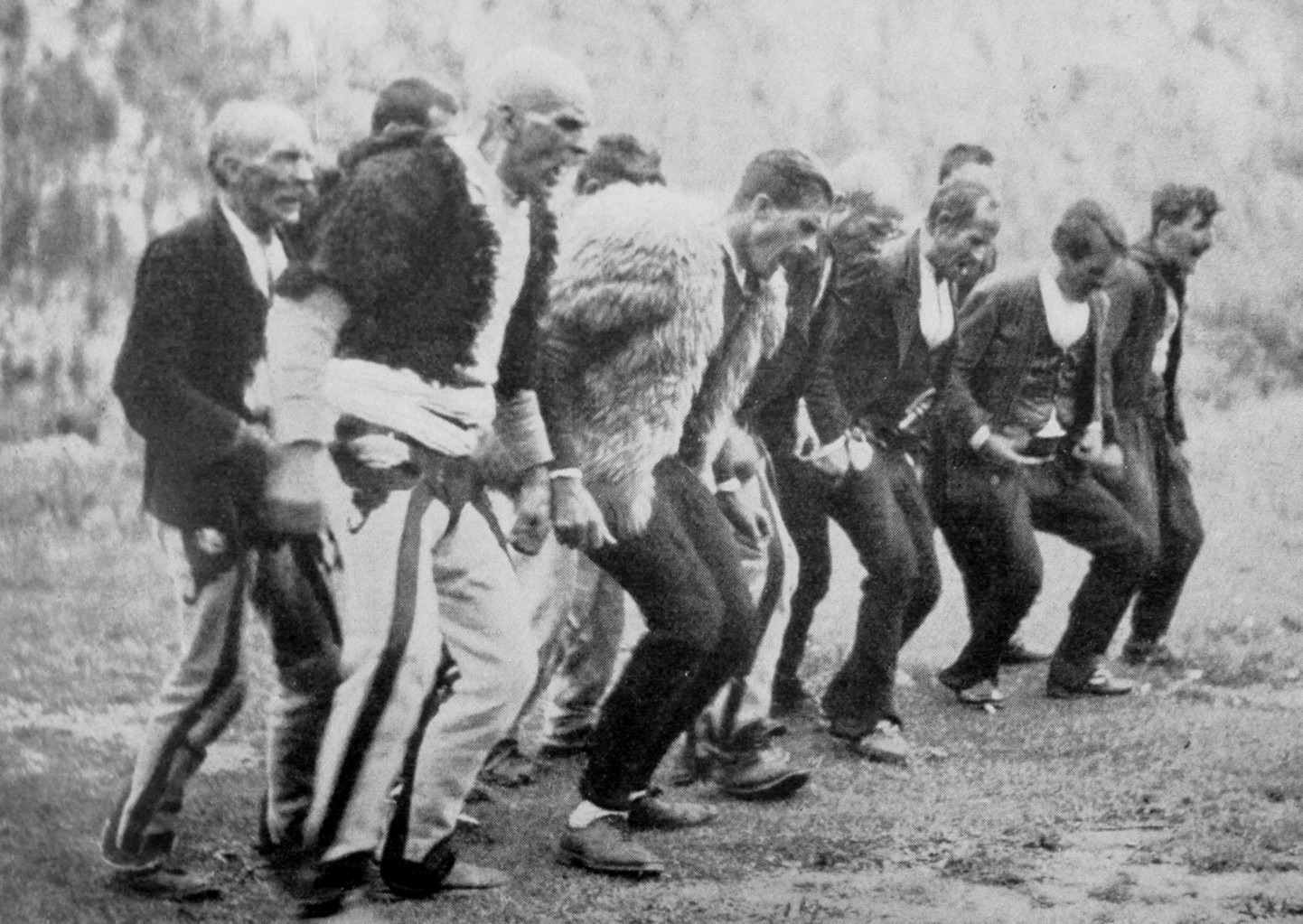
Practicing of Gjâma by the men of Theth (Shala) in the funeral of Ujk Vuksani, 1937.

In Albanian tradition the Earth is deeply respected so that she would carefully receive the dead in her chest. For instance, during the last phase of the Albanian traditional mourning practice – Gjâma – after a usual lament, the mourners sit on their knees in a row and continuing the last call of the dead person, they sit on the ground, put their foreheads upon the earth and caress the earth with their hands, as if they want to express love and care for the earth. They stay like this until someone of the house, specifically charged with this task, goes and lifts them up.

In all Albanian lands the burial custom required to put a metal coin in the grave, inserting it in the dead's hand or mouth, or on one side of the body. A general explanation was that it served "to pay for the place of the grave" or "to pay the Earth so that she keeps the dead inside her". This is a reflection of the cult of the Earth, associated "with the place of the new dwelling in the eternal life", with the coin representing a symbolic gift to the Earth. Coins of this type have also been found by archaeologists in the graves of the Albanians in the Middle Ages and in those of the Illyrians in antiquity.

In the Albanian mountains it was believed that the earth does not treat sinners and bad persons well. In the grave they would suffer being squashed by the earth; their graves also could catch fire. According to folk beliefs the earth could not bear inside her a dead person who has committed serious crimes during his life, so in that case the dead becomes a wandering lugat, harming people and livestock. This belief involves Albanian curse formulas as well, also appearing in Albanian epic poetry, in particular in the Kângë Kreshnikësh, such as the expression zirma, tokë, përjashta n'natë të vorr! "bring him out, oh earth, from that grave!". On the other hand, dead people who were good persons during their life would feel relieved in the grave spending their "life after death" in peace as the earth receives them well.

A special cult of graves and their sacredness can be seen in Albanian tradition. Tombs can never be destroyed, violated, or replaced with a house plot. The dead people are deified and venerated, and it is believed that they continue afterlife in the divine space of the earth where their graves are placed. This belief is strictly associated with the cult of the ancestors.

=== Pristine sacred places and building plots ===
According to Albanian folk beliefs, if someone cuts the wood in a pristine sacred space (Alb. vend të mirë), he would find misfortunes in his life. Misfortunes also would happen to those who build on a sacred ground, and the building would continue to bring bad luck to the related people. Some examples of pristine sacred spaces, groves, and trees, among Albanians are the White Oak in Qarrishta (Mirdita), the White Oak in Koman, the Sacred Oak in Labovë e Madhe, many resting places for cattle and resorts on the road, untouchable forests and fields, where even a branch cannot be taken from the trees and where a land lot is forbidden because the earth doesn't want or tolerate it. Even in abandoned places or where the population has died out, a house plot cannot be established because, according to popular beliefs, it would bring misfortunes and various disasters to the family, even die altogether.

The builder has to find a suitable place to build a house, through the signs that are provided by the earth, which either allow to establish the house plot where one thinks, or which doesn't allow it, so that the builder is obliged to step back and find another place. These beliefs are reflections of the worship of the earth goddess, who rules the earth, allowing or forbidding humans to place the plot of a new house in a tested location. If one does not listen to the relevant signs, he would go against this divine power.

Proofs for determining the placement of a house plot were mainly of mystic nature, and sometimes of techno-practical nature. The latter were easier to deal with, as they consisted in checking a place with or without moisture, a strong subsoil or a slippery soil, etc. As for the mystical aspects, such as luck and prosperity, they were harder to detect, and several concerns emerged about them. The elders, who preserved much historical and legendary knowledge, were also consulted. Houses could certainly be built in the land of the ancestors whose permanent prosperity was well-known, or in the place where a prosperous cattle stable used to be located.

A mystic practice consisted in stucking four pickaxes in the four corners of the tested plot at night, leaving the place and returning in the morning; if the pickaxes remained stuck in the morning it was a good sign, otherwise another place was to be tested. Another practice, consisted in filling one, or alternatively four bowls, with a liquid, often water (but sometimes also wine, olive oil, melted butter, honey, or milk, depending on the regional tradition), and in placing it at the center of the tested plot or alternatively on its four corners; when returning in the morning, if the liquid in the bowl(s) remained unchanged, it was a good sign. These mystic practices were always performed on waxing moon nights.

Another mystic test, widespread in all Albanian lands, consisted in performing a particular ritual with ashes poured in the area of the future domestic hearth (Alb. vatër), repeating it three times during three nights, and there were special people who knew how to decipher the signs that appeared in the ashes. Another test was performed using fire, which was kindled at the center of the tested plot on a calm and windless night with waxing moon. If the smoke spread over the ground in a soft and uniform manner, it was a good sign; if the smoke went up and only from one side, it was a bad sign and another place was to be tested. Ash and fire are clearly related to the Albanian cult of the fire and the hearth, regarded as symbols of the continuity of life across generations, showing whether the future generations will prosper in the new plot or they will encounter misfortunes, perhaps even to the point of extinction or abandonment of the new house.

Another test consisted in the ritual plowing of the land that is desired to be used to make the new house, by using oxen to drag the plow. If the oxen grunted during this process, it was a bad sign; if they walked quietly without grunting, it was a good sign and the land was considered suitable for building a house.

All these different rites converge in the mysterious and supernatural communication of humans with the earth-deity who was consulted for hosting the building, and who responded either by accepting the presence of humans giving them prosperity, or by driving them away.

=== Earth and Sky pairing ===
The earth is often paired with the sky in Albanian oath swearings, e.g.: për qiell e dhé, pasha tokën e pasha qiellin, etc.

== See also ==
- E Bukura e Dheut

== Bibliography ==
- Calin, Didier (2017). Dictionary of Indo-European Poetic and Religious Themes. Paris: Les Cent Chemins. ISBN 978-197610634-7.
- Daum, Werner (1998). Albanien zwischen Kreuz und Halbmond. Staatliches Museum für Völkerkunde. ISBN 978-370162461-4.
- Demiraj, Bardhyl; Starostin, Sergei; Lubotsky, Alexander; de Vaan, Michiel. "The Albanian inherited lexicon" (Database).
- Doja, Albert (2005). "Mythology and Destiny" (PDF). Anthropos. 100 (2): 449–462. doi:10.5771/0257-9774-2005-2-449. JSTOR 40466549. S2CID 115147696.
- Elsie, Robert (2001). A Dictionary of Albanian Religion, Mythology and Folk Culture. London: Hurst & Company. ISBN 1-85065-570-7.
- Golan, Ariel (1991). Myth and Symbol: Symbolism in Prehistoric Religions. A. Golan. ISBN 978-965222245-9.
- Golan, Ariel (2003). Prehistoric Religion: Mythology, Symbolism. A. Golan. ISBN 978-965905550-0.
- Hysi, Shyqyri (2006). "Kulte tradicionale shqiptare" [Albanian Traditional Cults]. Gjurmime Albanologjike – Folklor Dhe Etnologji (in Albanian) (36). Instituti Albanologjik i Prishtinës: 349–361 – via Central and Eastern European Online Library.
- Loria-Rivel, Gustavo Adolfo (2020). "Dede Korkut and its Parallelisms with Albanian Epic Traditions. Female Warriors in Albanian and Turkic Epics". In Nikol Dziub, Greta Komur-Thilloy (ed.). Penser le multiculturalisme dans les marges de l'Europe. Studies on South East Europe. Vol. 26. LIT Verlag Münster. pp. 45–53. ISBN 978-364391293-0.
- Mann, Stuart E. (1948). An Historical Albanian-English Dictionary. Vol. II, N–Z. Longmans, Green and Co.
- Matasović, Ranko (2018). A Reader in Comparative Indo-European Religion (PDF). University of Zagreb.
- Neziri, Zeqirja (2015). Lirika gojore shqiptare (in Albanian). Skopje: Interlingua. ISBN 978-9989-173-52-3.
- Pipahi (1993). "The Mythology of Albania". In Bonnefoy, Yves (ed.). American, African, and Old European mythologies. University of Chicago Press. ISBN 0-226-06457-3 – via Internet Archive.
- Poghirc, Cicerone (1987). "Albanian Religion". In Eliade, Mircea (ed.). The Encyclopedia of Religion. Vol. 1. New York: MacMillan Publishing Co. pp. 178–180. ISBN 978-002909700-7.
- Qafleshi, Muharrem (2011). Opoja dhe Gora ndër shekuj [Opoja and Gora During Centuries]. Albanological Institute of Pristina. ISBN 978-9951-596-51-0.
- Stipčević, Aleksandar (2009). "Elementët parahistorike në besimet e arbëreshëve të Zarës". AKTET (in Albanian): 505–509. ISSN 2073-2244.
- Tako, Piro (1988). Themistokli Gërmenji (in Albanian). Shtëpia Botuese "8 Nëntori".
- Tirta, Mark (2004). Bezhani, Petrit (ed.). Mitologjia ndër shqiptarë (in Albanian). Tirana: Mësonjëtorja. ISBN 99927-938-9-9.
- Ushaku, Ruzhdi (1988). "Mbi strukturën leksiko-semantike dhe etimologjike të tipit të togfjalëshit të shqipes burri i dheut (Mundësia për një rindërtim)". Gjurmime Albanologjike. 17–18: 63–76.
- Witczak, Krzysztof (2016). "The earliest Albanian loanwords in Greek". International Conference on Language Contact in the Balkans and Asia Minor. 1.
- Wolff, Martine (2022). "Transhumance in Kelmend, Northern Albania: Traditions, Contemporary Challenges, and Sustainable Development". In Bindi, Letizia (ed.). Grazing Communities: Pastoralism on the Move and Biocultural Heritage Frictions. Environmental Anthropology and Ethnobiology. Vol. 29. Berghahn Books. pp. 102–120. ISBN 978-180073476-0.
- York, Michael (1993). "Toward a Proto-Indo-European vocabulary of the sacred". WORD. 44 (2): 235–254. doi:10.1080/00437956.1993.11435902. ISSN 0043-7956.
