= I Bukuri i Qiellit =

I Bukuri i Qiellit ("The Beauty of the Sky", "The Beautiful one in Heaven") is used in Albanian to refer to the deity who rules the sky:

- Dielli (Albanian paganism), the Sun
- God in Abrahamic religions
