= Verore =

Traditional Albanian adornment

The Verore, also known as the summer bracelet, is a traditional Albanian adornment tied to the ancient festivity of Dita e Verës, a holiday that celebrates the onset of spring and honors nature and the resurgence of vegetation. This tradition is deeply rooted in the cultural practices of various communities, including Albanian Orthodox, Muslim, Catholic, and Bektashi groups. The Verore symbolizes hopes for abundance, prosperity, and good luck.

== Origin and Significance ==
The tradition of wearing the Verore originates from the Summer Day holiday, which is associated with honoring the natural world and the vibrant growth of vegetation during the early spring. This event marks the beginning of the spring season and embodies the community's wishes for a life filled with joy, love, and prosperity following the winter months. Celebrations begin on the 14th of March (the old 1. March in the Julianian Calendar) with the lighting of bonfires, where participants jump over the fire and pass wishes, which vary by province.

== Making Process ==
A typical Verore is crafted from two strands of yarn, one red and one white, each measuring 30–35 cm in length. The making process involves several steps:

1. The two strands are tied together at one end with a knot (kotkë), and a bead is placed through this knot.
2. Each strand is then twisted separately, and the ends are brought together and knotted again, with another bead placed through this second knot.
3. Finally, the yarns are twisted together to form the bracelet, which can also be fashioned into rings.

The bracelets are traditionally worn on the wrist, although children may also wear them on their feet for good luck and to prevent stumbling.

== Cultural Practices ==
=== Orthodox Community ===
The Orthodox community dons the Verore on the night before March 1 (according to the Julian calendar), celebrating the official start of Summer Day. The bracelets are worn until March 25 (Evangelism Day), with some believing they should be removed upon sighting the first swallow of the season.

=== Muslim Community ===
Muslims follow a similar tradition, making and wearing the bracelets with white and red yarn. They wear the Verore on the night before March 14 and remove them on March 25.

=== Bektashi Community ===
The Bektashi community distinguishes itself by using white and green strands of yarn for their bracelets. These are worn starting the night before March 14 and are removed on March 22.

=== Disposal Tradition ===
A common custom across the different communities is the practice of hanging the Verore on trees or rose bushes after they are taken off, in the belief that swallows will come and take them away. This act is symbolic of releasing the wishes and blessings imbued in the bracelets into nature. In one region, girls place the Verore on a bush at the end of the day, and if taken by a bird, the girl would then hopefully be married in a year's time. A common southern tradition is for girls to place their Verore on a rosebush after three weeks of wearing it until Nevruz.
