= Flia =

Albanian Dish

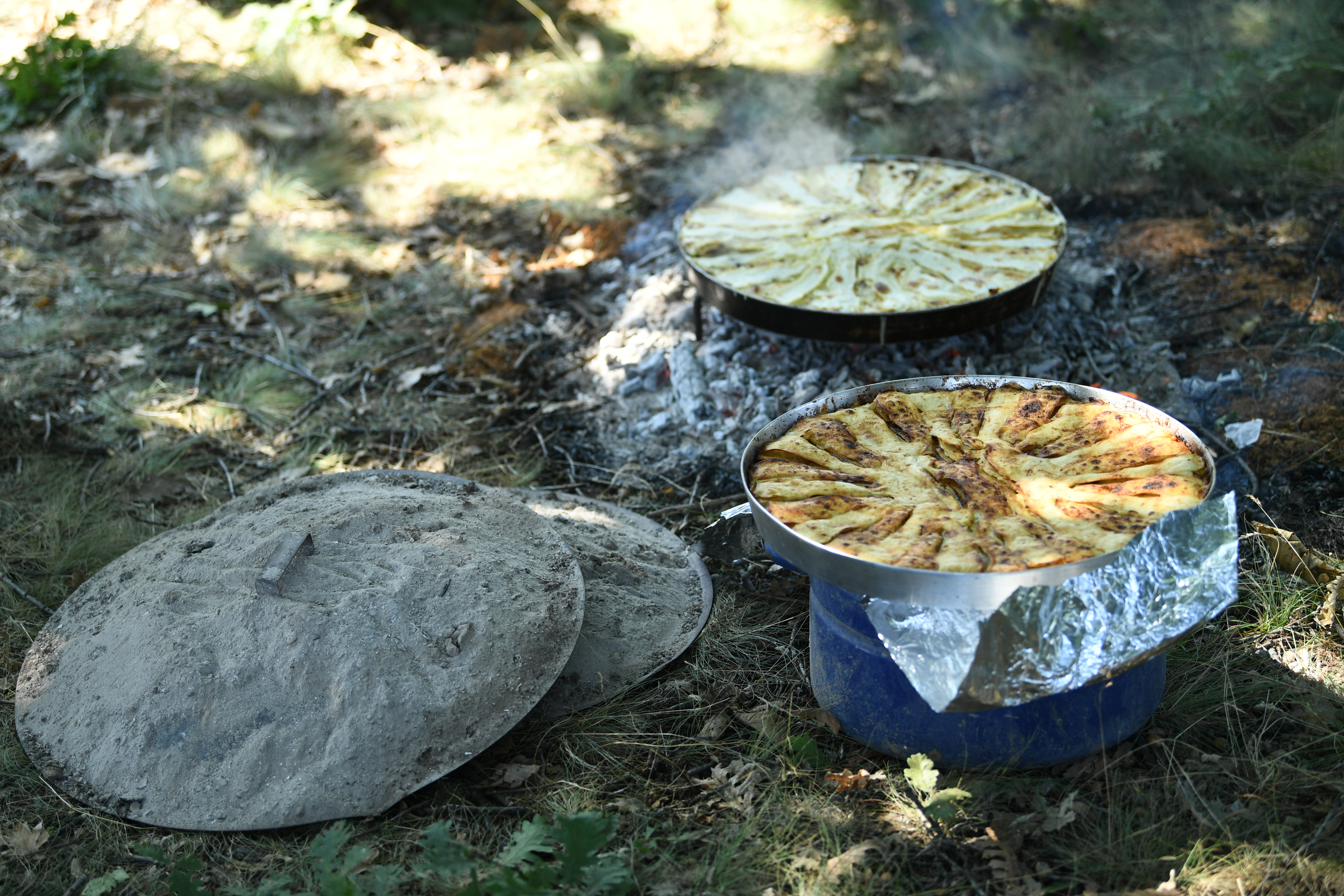
- Course: Main course
- Place of origin: Albania / Kosovo
- Region or state: Balkans
- Associated cuisine: Albanian cuisine
- Serving temperature: Hot
- Main ingredients: Flour, water, salt
- Ingredients generally used: Butter, yogurt, oil, eggs, nuts

Flia (also flija; Albanian indefinite form: fli) is an Albanian dish typical of northern Albania and of the cuisine of Kosovo. It consists of multiple crêpe-like layers brushed with cream and served with sour cream and butter, or with white cheese and pickled cucumber (an alternative is turshia). The name translates to "sacrifice" (see fli). Flia is prepared in the shape of the Sun (Albanian Dielli) also featuring sunbeams.

== Tradition ==
March 17, which falls within the traditional Albanian festivities of Verëza (spring equinox), is recognized as "Flia Day" in which families invite their relatives and friends for preparing and eating flia. It is assumed that flia began to be prepared by Albanians for Verëza as a sacrifice to the Sun-god. In Kosovo, flia is traditionally eaten on sundays.

== Preparation ==
Flia requires very simple ingredients, although it takes a rather long time to prepare (up to four hours), because of repetitions in preparing the dish. The ingredients are flour, water, butter, yogurt, eggs, oil and salt. Some variations use kaymak as the filling instead. The main ingredients (flour, water and salt) are mixed together until they become like pancake batter. Flia is not a sweet dish, and is instead a savory main course dish eaten usually during lunch or dinner. Layers of batter are baked using a saq, a spherical metal lid used for baking. Flia can also be baked in an oven, and can free up time to bake two flia.
