= Nëna e Diellit =

Nëna e Diellit ("the Mother of the Sun" or "the Sun's Mother") is a mother goddess in Albanian folk beliefs, the mother of Dielli ("the Sun"). A sacred ritual called "the funeral of the Sun's Mother" was very widespread in southeastern Albania until the 20th century. She has been described by scholars as a heaven goddess and a goddess of agriculture, livestock, and earth fertility, as suggested by the sacred ritual dedicated to her. Nëna e Diellit also features as a deity in Albanian folk tales. Nëna e Diellit represents a manifestation of the personification of the Sun in Albanian mythology.

== Ritual ==
A sacred ritual called "funeral of the Sun's Mother" consisted in burying a female figure that probably personified a seasonal phase of the mother goddess. Occurring at the end of May, it was the last festival of the spring cycle, coinciding with the feast of Pentecost (Rusica). It was very widespread in southeastern Albania until the 20th century. During the custom the girls and young women gathered flowers, danced and sang, celebrating together with meals. After lunch or at the end of the day, they made a clay doll that they called Sun's Mother (Nëna e Diellit), put it on a tile and went outside the village to bury the female figure. It was performed in silence and with all the appropriate seriousness of the death ceremony. The girls and young women mourned the mother goddess, pronouncing the typical verses Nënë moj nënë, kuku / erdhi dielli e s'të gjeti "Mother oh Mother, Alas, / the Sun came and didn't find you".

== Folk tales ==
Nëna e Diellit features as a deity in several Albanian folk tales. One of them has been collected by Albanologist Maximilian Lambertz and published under the title "Bei der Sonnenmutter" ["At the Sun's Mother"] in the collection Die geflügelte Schwester und die Dunklen der Erde: Albanische Volksmärchen [The Winged Sister and the Dark Ones of the Earth: Albanian Folk Tales]. Another has been collected by Albanologist Robert Elsie and published under the title "The Snake and the King's Daughter" in the collection Albanian Folktales and Legends.

== See also ==
- Zonja e Dheut
