= Spring day =

Holiday marking the start of spring

Spring Day is a holiday marking the coming of the spring season, which takes place in different countries, on varying dates.

== Northern Hemisphere ==
=== Albania ===
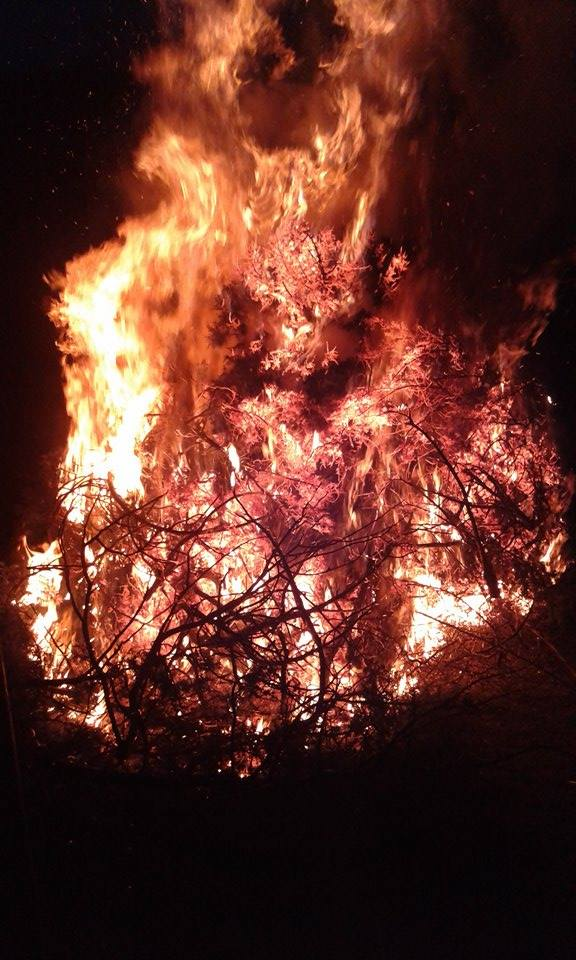
Zjarri for the celebration of Dita e Verës in Tropojë, northern Albania. Kindled on the eve or before sunrise in order to give strength to the Sun (Dielli), people dance and sing around it or jump across it, a ritual practiced for the end of winter, renewal, purification and apotropaic purposes.

Albanians celebrates the Spring Day, in Albanian: Dita e Verës "Summer Day", on 14 March, and in 2004 it became a national holiday in Albania. It is an old Albanian pagan practice, celebrating the strengthening of the Sun (Dielli) and the renewal of nature. Every year, a special celebration of this traditional festival takes place in the city of Elbasan, and traditional rituals are performed throughout Abanian-inhabited territories.

On 14 March, the Arbëreshë of the Italian coast, an Albanian community that lives in Italy since the fifteenth century, collect a tuft of grass roots and soil, bringing it home to commemorate the anniversary of their emigration from Albania. In fact, some sources date back this celebration to the ancient Illyria. At that time, the feast was celebrated on 1 March, which according to the Julian calendar, corresponded to the first day of the year.

Pilgrimages are made to the highest peaks in the Albanian sacred mountains to be as close as possible to the Sun God and pray for the goodness and prosperity of the new year. The great Fire (Zjarri) is kindled on the eve or before sunrise in order to give strength to the Sun, and people dance and sing around it or jump across it, a ritual practiced for the end of winter, renewal, purification and apotropaic purposes. Wreaths and garlands are put on the doors of the houses for good luck.

The celebration of Dita e Verës begins on the previous day with the preparation of sweets: the revani and ballakume, the blended butter, sugar, corn flour and egg yolks cooked in a wood oven. During the evening ballakume, dried figs, walnuts, turkey legs, boiled eggs, Simit (a typical sandwich of the city) are distributed to members of the family. The oldest woman of the house remains awake at night and goes from room to room to put down grass on the cushions of couples, young people and children, a ritual that symbolizes the regeneration and quickening.

On the morning of 14 March, the elderly leave the door open as a sign of generosity, a pitcher filled with fresh water and take home a clump of green grass. The youngest fertilizes the orange and olive trees, but the smaller ones are the first to make the "lucky" visits to neighbors and relatives who give them turkey legs, dried figs and nuts. Finally lunch on 14 March, should be eaten outdoors in the company of friends and relatives.

=== Estonia ===
Estonia celebrates Spring Day on 1 May.

=== Bangladesh ===
Bangladesh celebrates Spring day on 14 February as the first of the month of Falgun. It is the beginning of the Boshonto, the Spring season for Bengalis.Before 2019, the first of Falgun used to fell on 13 February of the Gregorian Calendar, however, from 2020 onwards, due to changes to the Bangladeshi calendars, Pohela Falgun is celebrated on 14 February, making the day celebrated with the Valentine's Day in the country.

== Southern Hemisphere ==
=== Argentina ===
Argentina celebrates the beginning of spring, conventionally, on 21 September, one or two days before the actual spring equinox. This day also marks Students' Day.

Though this is not a work-free public holiday, it coincides with Students' Day, which is a no-school day for students on all the levels of the education system. The holiday is therefore mostly observed and dominated by teenagers and young adults, who massively take over public parks, beaches and other outdoor venues in the larger cities, and enjoy sports or picnics.

Local administrations usually offer the public a number of entertainment shows, such as free rock concerts. In recent years security operations have been staged to avoid incidents such as fights and vandalism, as well as controls to curb the consumption of alcoholic beverages.

=== Paraguay ===
Paraguay celebrates the beginning of spring on 21 September, one or two days before the actual spring equinox. This day also marks Youth Day.

=== Uruguay ===
Uruguay celebrates the beginning of spring, on 21 September, one or two days before the actual spring equinox.

=== Bolivia ===
Bolivia celebrates the beginning of spring, on 21 September, it is also Students' day and "día del amor", on this day youth will send cards, chocolates and flowers to their friends, mates, or lovers.

=== South Africa ===
South Africa celebrates spring Day on the 1 September. Spring day traditions include children celebrating by spraying each other with water and giving school students a civvies day. However, in some urban settlements everyone participates.
