= Dita e Verës =

Albanian traditional festival and public holiday in Albania, March 14

- Observed by: Albanians
- Liturgical color: Red, White
- Type: Pagan Holiday
- Celebrations: Spring equinox: the beginning of the spring-summer period
- Date: March 14
- Duration: 2 days
- Frequency: Annual

Dita e Verës or Verëza (English "Summer Day") is an Albanian spring festival and pagan holiday celebrated (also officially in Albania) on March 14 of the Gregorian calendar (March 1 of the Julian calendar), for the beginning of the spring-summer period.

In the old Albanian calendar, Verëza corresponds to the first three days of the new year (Albanian: Kryeviti, Kryet e Motmotit, Motmoti i Ri, Nata e Mojit) and marks the end of the winter season (the second half of the year) and the beginning of the "summer" season (the first half of the year) on the spring equinox (Albanian: sadita-nata), the period of the year when daylight is longer than night. Dita e Verës is a chief festivity in traditional Albanian religion, celebrating the strengthening of the Sun (Dielli) and the renewal of nature, also respecting the vegetation and the Earth (Dheu).

== Description ==
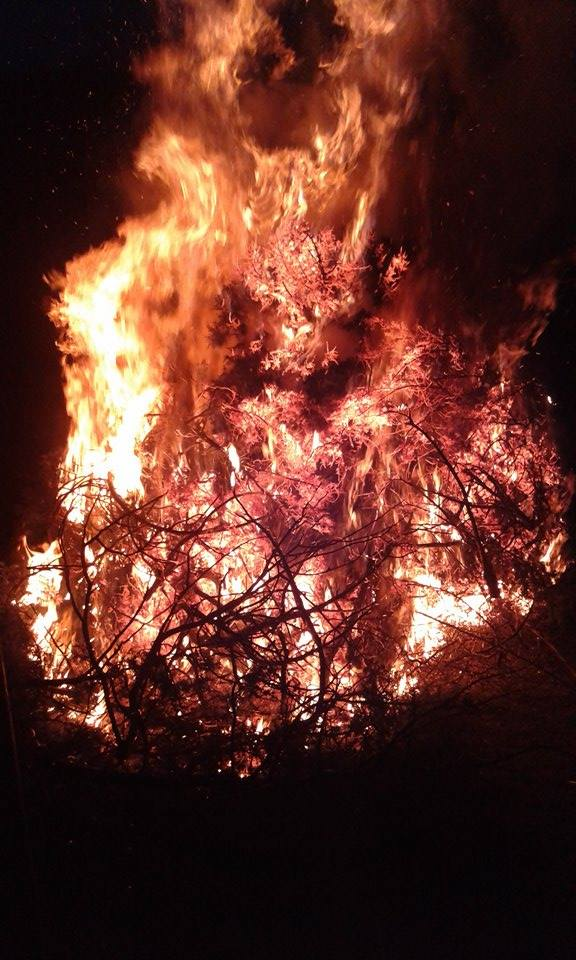
Zjarri for the celebration of Dita e Verës in Tropojë, northern Albania. Kindled on the eve or before sunrise in order to give strength to the Sun (Dielli), people dance and sing around it or jump across it, a ritual practiced for the end of winter, renewal, purification and apotropaic purposes.

Dita e Verës is celebrated on March 1 of the Julian calendar, the first day of the new year (which is March 14 in the Gregorian calendar). It is celebrated both in the Northern and Southern regions, but with regional differences. On the eve or before sunrise, bonfires (zjarre) are traditionally lit in yards throughout Abanian-inhabited territories with the function to drive away the darkness of the winter season and for the strengthening of the Sun, as well as for purification and apotropaic purposes. The ritual is performed with people dancing and singing around the fire or jumping across it.

The shrine of Diana of Cermenika, located in the Albanian city of Elbasan, celebrates Diana the goddess of forests, greenery and nature. The distinctive sign of this holiday is baking ballokume, a sugar cookie made with Albanian corn. In Lezha, Dita e Verës fires are lit to signify the sun's purity and strength. Although the holiday continues to be highlighted in the ancient city of Elbasan, it is celebrated by all Albanians. A Red and White wool bracelet called "Verore" is worn to celebrate the beginning of summer. This along with other March Summer Balkan traditions is a UNESCO recognized "intangible cultural heritage".

The holiday maintains a family and traditional atmosphere, in which parents, children and families celebrate together. On this day Albanians congratulate each other on living long and happy lives. Families would jump over a small fire, signifying a full cleansing going into a new year.

Thanas Meksi, a renowned researcher and musicologist, divided the festival into four phases:

1. Preparatory Phase: This begins with the collection of necessary items for the Summer Day.
2. Summer Night: Starting on the evening of March 13, this phase is marked by fire.
3. Morning of Summer Day: Commences on March 14, bringing joy and festivity.
4. Summer Day Picnic: Held at noon on March 14, this phase embodies communal celebration.

Rituals of the Summer Day include washing eyes with summer flowers, drinking water from "the pig's trough" (a wild spring found underground in forested areas), symbolizing a healthy and prosperous year. Another tradition is the boiling of eggs on the night of March 13th and washing the eyes with this water on the morning of March 14th.

The morning of March 14 begins with visits to relatives, where the youngest son delivers shared goods. The picnic starts at 10:00 am, although in recent years activities have begun an hour earlier. Albanians head to scenic spots for this celebration. Each year, the festival evolves, reflecting the spirit of its people. Elbasan becomes a pilgrimage center on March 14, with the entire city dressing up in vibrant decorations. The local government allocates special funds for the festival, planning concerts, traditional games, and comedic performances in tourist spots and parks, enhancing the festive atmosphere and community bonding.

Edith Durham – who collected Albanian ethnographic material from northern Albania and Montenegro – reported that Albanian traditional tattooing of girls was practiced on March 19, which falls in the days of the Albanian spring celebrations.

== Ballokume ==
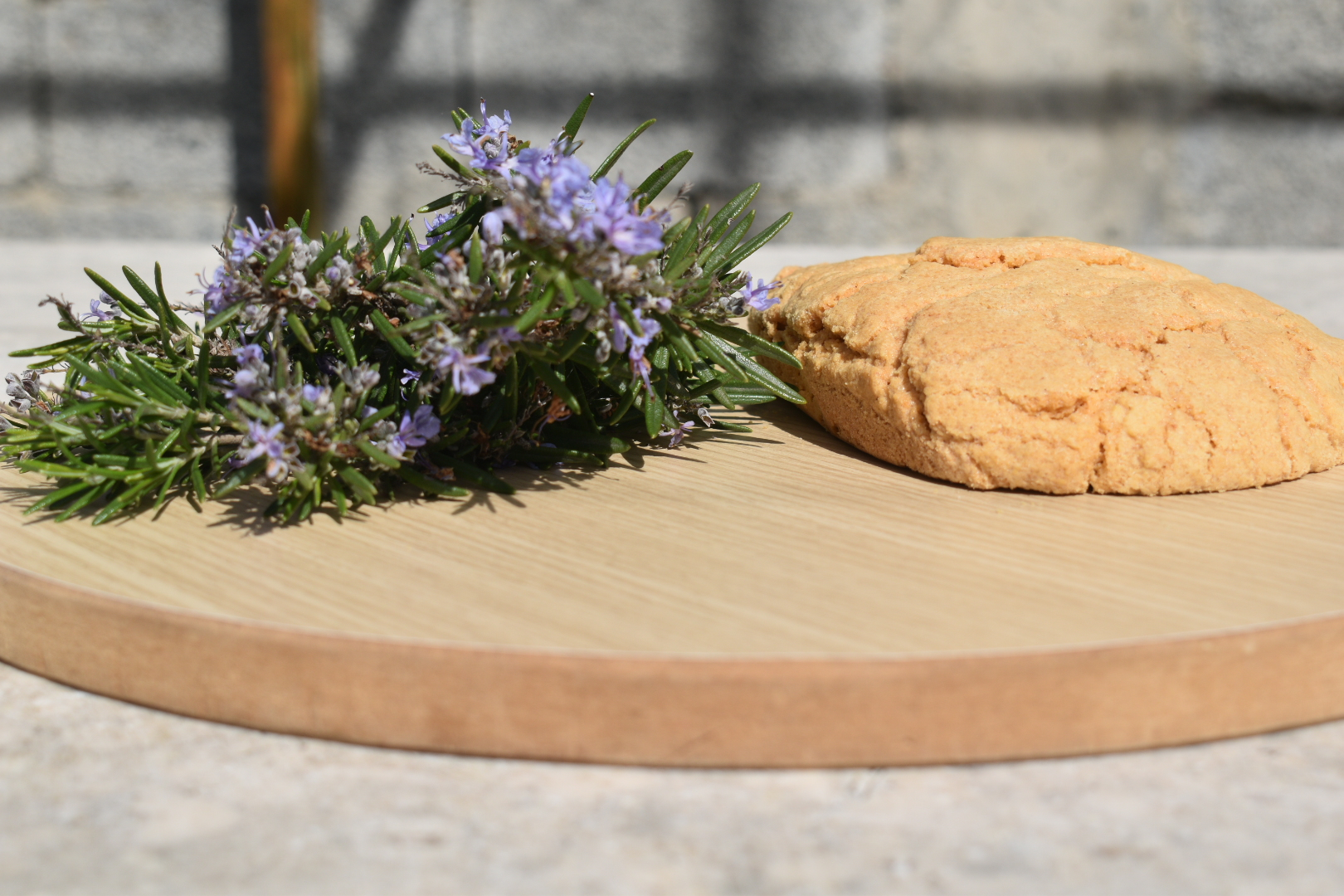
Ballokume from Elbasan, Albania

Ballokume is a dessert unique to Elbasan and is synonymous with the Summer Day celebration. It's widely enjoyed across Albania and in Albanian communities around the world. This cookie is especially associated with Dita e Verës. The name Ballokume is believed to have originated from a 15th-century Ottoman ruler's exclamation, "Është ba si llokume!" which means "It’s as good as a lokum!" after tasting a small cake made from corn flour cooked in a wood fire. This term, over time, evolved into Ballokume.

The primary ingredients of Ballokume include butter, sugar, eggs, and cornflour. Traditionally, it is kneaded in a copper bowl to enhance the texture of the dough, a process that involves vigorous kneading, often done by men in the household due to the strength required. The cookie sometimes contains finj, a mixture of ashes from a wood stove boiled in water, adding a unique flavor to the cookie.

== Flia ==
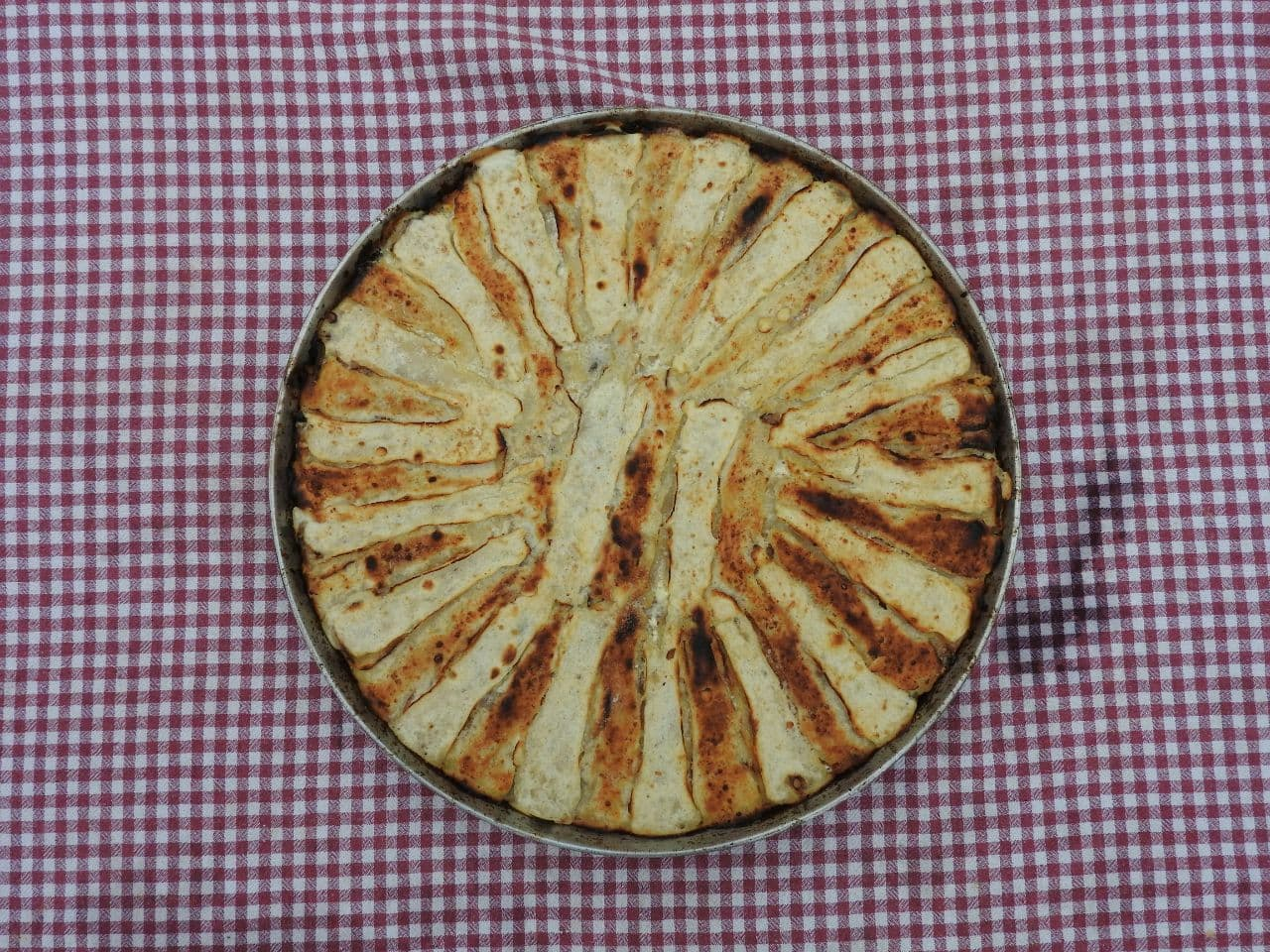
Fli from Prishtina, Kosovo.

Flia is an Albanian dish typical of northern Albania and of the cuisine of Kosovo. It consists of multiple crêpe-like layers brushed with cream and served with sour cream and butter. The name translates to "sacrifice" (see fli). Flia is prepared in the shape of the Sun (Albanian Dielli) also featuring sunbeams. March 17, which falls within the traditional Albanian festivities of Verëza, is recognized as "Flia Day" in which families invite their relatives for preparing and eating flia. It is assumed that flia began to be prepared by Albanians for Verëza as a sacrifice to the Sun-god.

== Traditions across regions ==
=== Tropoja ===
In Tropojë, this season gathers many people in the village of Luzhë, where they seek help and prosperity from tombs that have now been turned into idols. Adults and children travel for kilometers across mountainous terrains to reach these tombs.

=== Dibra ===
In Dibër, children light fires in the evening. Around four in the morning, people there wake up "to close the doors." This term means to wake up early and tie the gate's lock with wool. The symbolism of this action is not known. Boiled eggs are also an indicator of this day in Dibra.

=== Elbasan ===
Elbasan is believed to be the birthplace of the so-called Summer Day. In Elbasan, the festive dimensions are larger than anywhere else. They take on a popular character, and participation is at a national level. Songs, dances, crowds filling the city, boiled eggs painted in various colors, and the famous sweets called Ballokume that fill the markets. On this day, citizens from many cities of the country visit the city of Elbasan.

=== Skrapar and Lushnjë ===
In Skrapar and Lushnjë once the verore is removed, a wish is thought of, and then the bracelet is thrown into a bush or rose, or placed on a tree branch in the hope that a swallow will come to take it to build its nest, thereby fulfilling the thought wish.

On this day, children in Skrapar go door to door singing the song of Summer Day, receiving as gifts colored eggs which they crack on each other's heads. The typical dish of Skrapar for this festival, besides Ballokume, is also Anak (a type of pie) with wild greens. Just like in Tropojë, in the evening, fires are lit to produce smoke, bidding farewell to the old and the bad, while children sing and dance around the fire.

In Lushnjë, along with eggs, corn and wheat are also boiled to give to the children that come singing. Despite this, in Lushnjë Summer Day is not always celebrated on March 14; in fact, for Orthodox Christians, it is celebrated on March 1, while Muslims celebrate it on March 14.

=== Berat ===
In Berat, the celebration starts early in the morning with groups of children from neighborhoods of this city. The children, dressed as if in the day of the carnivals improvising the devil, appeared with various masks as a symbol of the Summer Day festival.

Various groups of children from kindergartens, schools, and high schools with their masks have traversed all the roads leading to the city's central square, performing humorous gestures. On the other hand, a car is displayed, which has the portrait of the devil on its body, ahead of which a carriage with brides symbolizes the day of the celebration.

=== Korçë ===
Korçë, along with Kolonjë, are regions that utilize both calendars for the celebration of the Summer Day. In these areas, the festival is celebrated on both March 1st and March 14th. Particularly on March 14 and on the evening before, the youth and children of Korçë roam through the city's neighborhoods lighting fires. Traditionally, children compete to find more scraps to make the biggest fire. Then, for prosperity, everyone tries to jump over the fire as a symbol of successfully overcoming winter's cold, the revival, and the warming of the blood that Spring brings. Families in their homes bake sweet or salty cakes, symbolizing life, revival, and abundance.

=== Kosovo ===
The Summer Day, also known as "Dita e Verëzës," has been celebrated in Kosovo. The festivities include young men and women going out to village squares and mountainsides, gathering the first flowers of the season, dancing, singing, lighting fires, and preparing special dishes made with corn and wheat flour, which are similar yet distinct from Elbasan's ballokume. This festival is celebrated with the belief that the Summer Day brings luck, health, prosperity, rejuvenation, and human love, and the rituals are connected with the awakening of vegetation, the revival of life, and the transition from winter to spring.

=== Albanians in North Macedonia ===
In North Macedonia ethnologist Afet Jashari notes that for this festival various caves such as the Vertop Cave or the Red Water Cave are visited. It is believed that washing with their water, especially on Summer Day, brings fertility and good luck for women, health for children.

== See also ==
- Culture of Albania
- Albanian paganism
- Ballokume

== Bibliography ==
- Elsie, Robert (2001). A Dictionary of Albanian Religion, Mythology and Folk Culture. London: Hurst & Company. ISBN 1-85065-570-7.
- Halimi, Zanita; Halimi-Statovci, Drita; Xhemaj, Ukë (2011). Rite dhe Aktualiteti [Rites and Contemporariness/Present Time] (PDF). Translated by Lumnije Kadriu. University of Prishtina.
- Qafleshi, Muharrem (2011). Opoja dhe Gora ndër shekuj [Opoja and Gora During Centuries]. Albanological Institute of Pristina. ISBN 978-9951-596-51-0.
- Sela, Jonida (2017). "Values and Traditions in Ritual Dances of All-Year Celebrations in Korça Region, Albania". International Conference "Education and Cultural Heritage". Vol. 1. Association of Heritage and Education. pp. 62–71.
- Tirta, Mark (2004). Petrit Bezhani (ed.). Mitologjia ndër shqiptarë (in Albanian). Tirana: Mësonjëtorja. ISBN 99927-938-9-9.
