= Ballokume =

Traditional Albanian sweet pastry

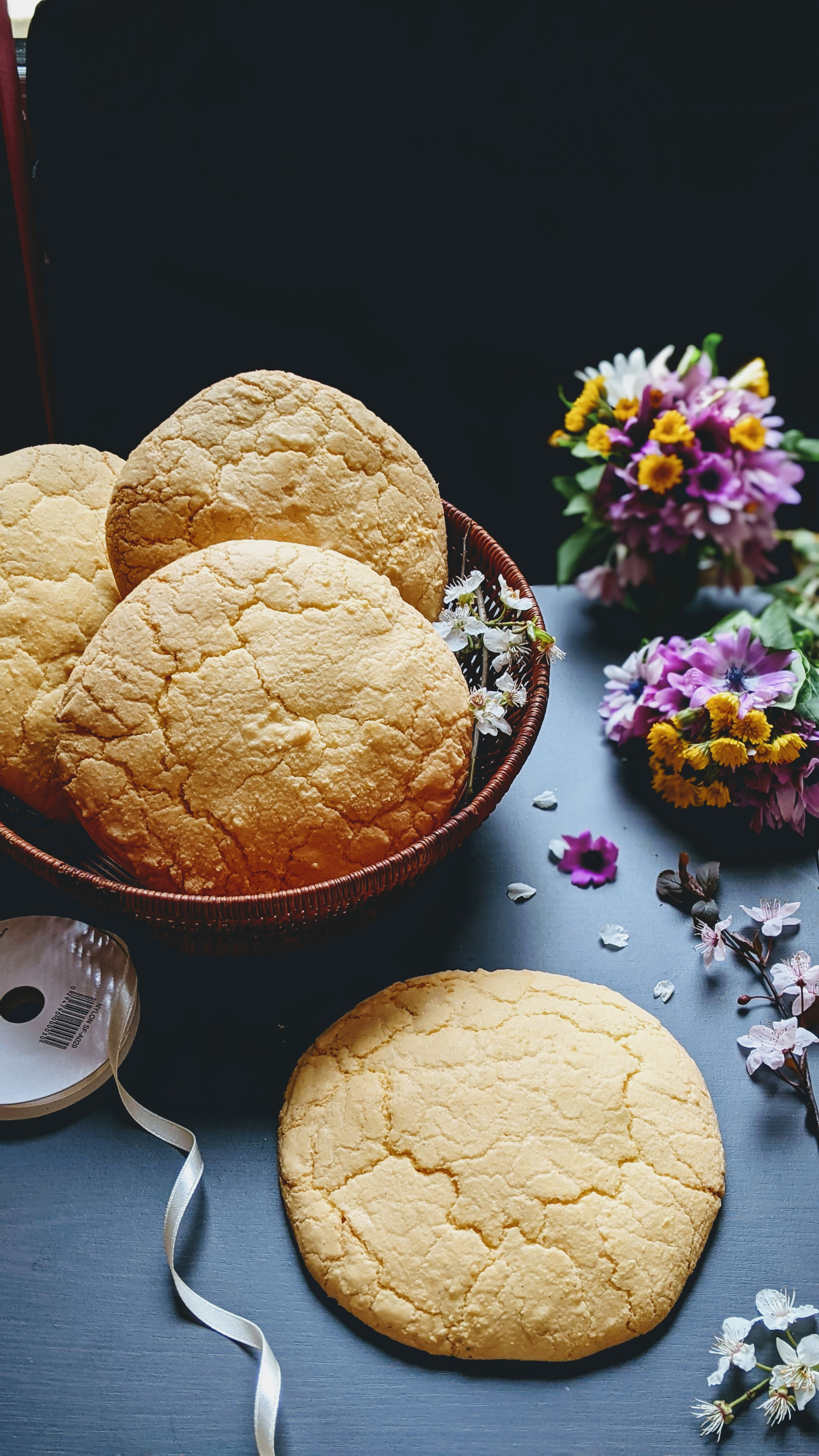
- Alternative names: Ballakume, kulaç me finj
- Type: Cookie
- Place of origin: Albania
- Region or state: Elbasan
- Main ingredients: Corn flour, butter, sugar, eggs
- Variations: Milk, ashes

Ballokume is an Albanian cookie originating in the city of Elbasan, which is popular throughout Albania and Albanian communities. It is traditionally eaten on Dita e Verës, an Albanian pagan holiday celebrated on 14 March. It is sometimes called kulaç me finj, as it may optionally contain finj, a mixture of ashes from a wood stove boiled in water. It consists of butter, sugar, eggs, and corn flour. It is traditionally kneaded in a copper bowl, which is supposed to improve the texture of the dough. The dough must be kneaded vigorously, which is why the men of the house are often involved in the ballokume preparation.

== Etymology ==
Tradition holds that the name comes from a 16-century Ottoman ruler of Elbasan who, after having tasted a small cake made from corn flour cooked in a wood fire, exclaimed: "Është ba si llokume!" ("It's as good as a lokum!"), the word ballokume resulting by contracting this sentence.

== See also ==
- Albanian cuisine
