= Dielli (Albanian paganism) =

The Sun in Albanian paganism

Solar symbols that commonly appear in Albanian traditional art, including tattooing, grave art, jewellery, embroidery, and house carvings.
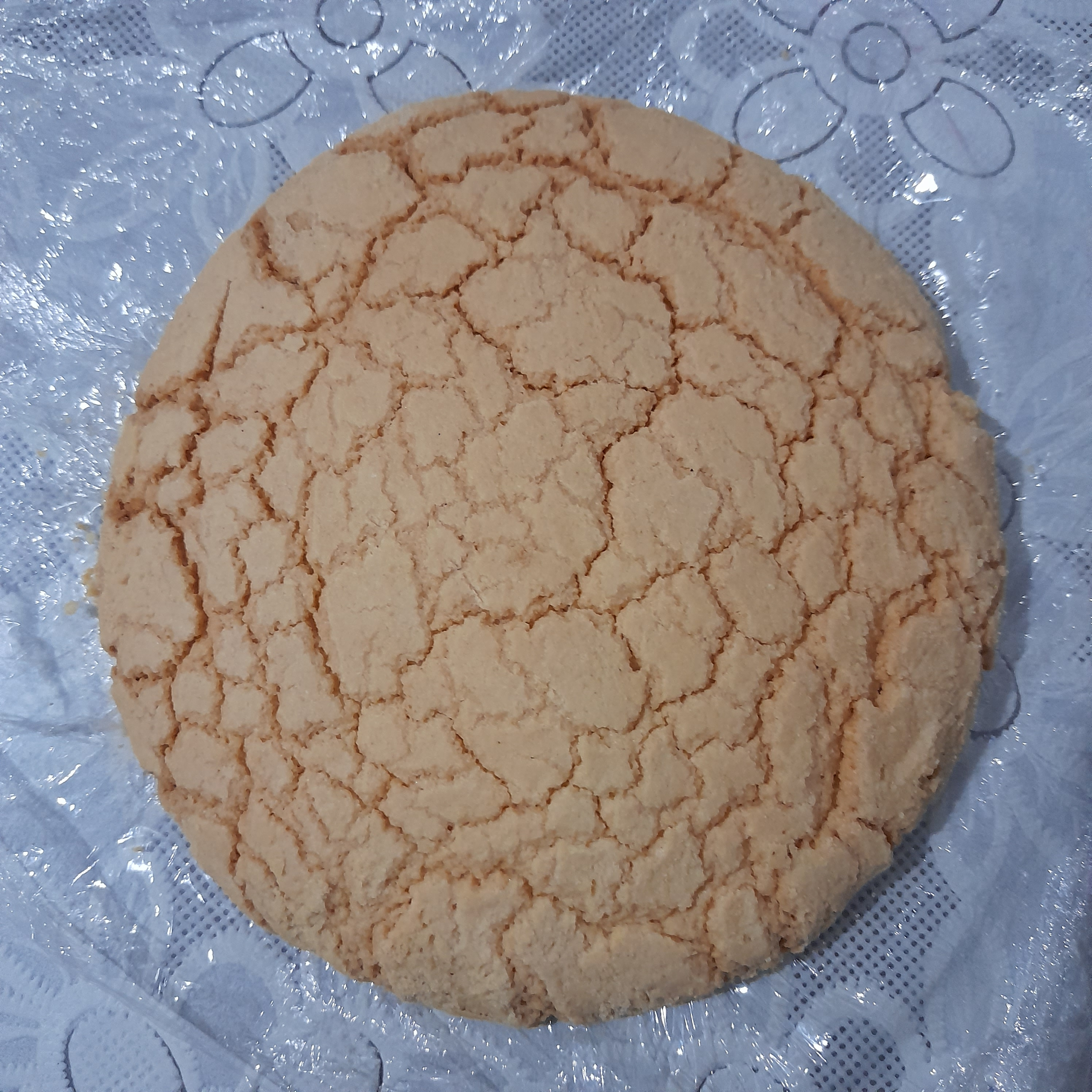
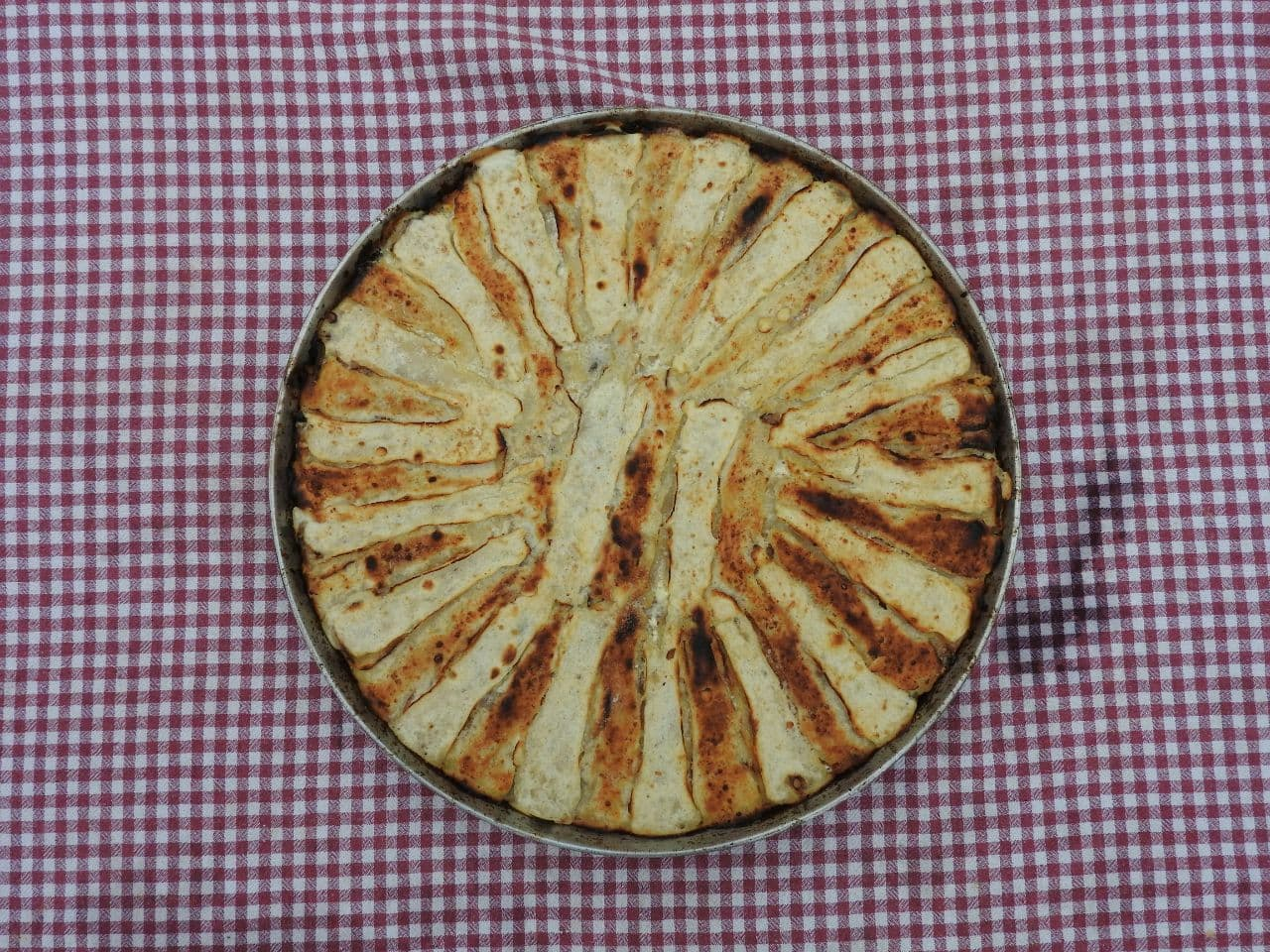
Ballokume, Albanian cookie originating in the city of Elbasan in central Albania but very popular among Albanians (left); Flia (meaning "sacrifice"), northern Albanian dish (right). They are figurative representations of the Sun, traditionally eaten during Dita e Verës or Verëza – an Albanian pagan spring festival, celebrated by all Albanians (also officially in Albania) to drive away the darkness of the winter season allowing nature's renewal and for the strengthening of the Sun, traditionally by litting bonfires (zjarre) in yards everywhere, especially on high places.

Dielli (Albanian indefinite form Diell), the Sun, holds the primary role in Albanian pagan customs, beliefs, rituals, myths, and legends. Albanian major traditional festivities and calendar rites are based on the Sun, worshiped as the god of light, sky and weather, giver of life, health and energy, and all-seeing eye. In Albanian tradition the fire – zjarri, evidently also called with the theonym Enji – worship and rituals are particularly related to the cult of the Sun. Ritual calendar fires or bonfires are traditionally kindled before sunrise in order to give strength to the Sun and to ward off evil. Many rituals are practiced before and during sunrise, honoring this moment of the day as it is believed to give energy and health to the body. As the wide set of cultic traditions dedicated to him indicates, the Albanian Sun-god appears to be an expression of the Proto-Indo-European Sky-god (Zot or Zojz in Albanian).

Albanians were firstly described in written sources as worshippers of the Sun and the Moon by German humanist Sebastian Franck in 1534, but the Sun and the Moon have been preserved as sacred elements of Albanian tradition since antiquity. Illyrian material culture shows that the Sun was the chief cult object of the Illyrian religion. Finding correspondences with Albanian folk beliefs and practices, the Illyrian Sun-deity is figuratively represented on Iron Age plaques from Lake Shkodra as the god of the sky and lightning, also associated with the fire altar where he throws lightning bolts. The symbolization of the cult of the Sun, which is often combined with the crescent Moon, is commonly found in a variety of contexts of Albanian folk art, including traditional tattooing, grave art, jewellery, embroidery, and house carvings. Solemn oaths (be), good omens, and curse formulas, involve and are addressed to, or taken by, the Sun. Prayers to the Sun, ritual bonfires, and animal sacrifices have been common practices performed by Albanians during the ritual pilgrimages on mountain tops.

In Albanian the god who rules the sky is referred to as i Bukuri i Qiellit ("the Beautiful of the Sky"), a phrase that is used in pagan contexts for the Sun, the god of light and giver of life who fades away the darkness of the world and melts the frost, allowing the renewal of Nature. According to folk beliefs, the Sun makes the sky cloudy or clears it up. Albanian rituals for rainmaking invoke the Sky and the Sun. In Albanian tradition the Sun is referred to as an "eye", which is a reflection of the Indo-European belief according to which the Sun is the eye of the Sky-God *Di̯ḗu̯s (Zojz in Albanian tradition). According to folk beliefs, the Sun is all-seeing, with a single glance he possesses the ability to see the entire surface of the Earth. The Sun, referred to as "the all-seeing (big) eye" is invoked in solemn oaths (be), and information about everything that happens on Earth is asked to the all-seeing Sun in ritual songs. In Albanian pagan beliefs and mythology the Sun is animistically personified as a male deity. The Moon (Hëna) is his female counterpart. In pagan beliefs the fire hearth (vatra e zjarrit) is the symbol of fire as the offspring of the Sun. In some folk tales, myths and legends the Sun and the Moon are regarded as husband and wife, also notably appearing as the parents of E Bija e Hënës dhe e Diellit ("the Daughter of the Moon and the Sun"); in others the Sun and the Moon are regarded as brother and sister, but in this case they are never considered consorts. Nëna e Diellit ("the Mother of the Sun" or "the Sun's Mother") also appears as a personified deity in Albanian folk beliefs and tales.

Albanian beliefs, myths and legends are organized around the dualistic struggle between good and evil, light and darkness, which cyclically produces the cosmic renewal. The most famous representation of it is the constant battle between drangue and kulshedra, which is seen as a mythological extension of the cult of the Sun and the Moon, widely observed in Albanian traditional art. In Albanian traditions, kulshedra is also fought by the Daughter of the Moon and the Sun, who uses her light power against pride and evil, or by other heroic characters marked in their bodies by the symbols of celestial objects, such as Zjermi (lit. "the Fire"), who notably is born with the Sun on his forehead.

== Name ==
=== Etymology ===
The Albanian word diell (definite form: dielli) is considered to have been a word taboo originally meaning "yellow, golden, bright/shiny one" used to refer to the Sun due to its perceived sacred nature. The commonly accepted historical linguistic evolution of the word is: Albanian dielli < Proto-Albanian *dðiella < *dziella- < Pre-Proto-Albanian *ȷ́élu̯a- < Proto-Indo-European *ǵʰélh₃u̯o- "yellow, golden, bright/shiny".

Sunday is named e diel in Albanian, translating the Latin diēs Sōlis with the native name of the Sun.

=== Epithet ===
In Albanian tradition the Sun is referred to as "the Beauty of the Sky" (i Bukuri i Qiellit), a phrase used for the god who rules the sky.

According to a modern interpretation, the ancestors of the Albanians presumably had in common with the Ancient Greek theogony the tripartite division of the administration of the world into heaven, sea, and underworld, and in the same functions as the Greek deities Zeus, Poseidon, and Hades, they would have worshiped the deities referred to as the Beauty of the Sky (i Bukuri i Qiellit), the Beauty of the Sea (e Bukura e Detit), and the Beauty of the Earth (e Bukura e Dheut). The phrase "the Beauty of the Sky" continues to be used in Albanian to refer to the Sun in pagan contexts and to the monotheistic God in Abrahamic contexts, the Beauty of the Sea and the Beauty of the Earth are kept as figures of Albanian folk beliefs and fairy tales.

== History ==
Early evidence of the celestial cult in Illyria, which finds correspondences with Albanian folk beliefs and practices, is provided by 6th century BCE plaques from Lake Shkodra, which belonged to the Illyrian tribal area of what was referred in historical sources to as the Labeatae in later times. The plaques depict simultaneously sacred representations of the sky and the sun, and symbolism of lightning and fire, as well as the sacred tree and birds (eagles). In those plaques there is a mythological representation of the celestial deity: the Sun deity animated with a face and two wings, throwing lightning into a fire altar, which in some plaques is held by two men (sometimes on two boats).

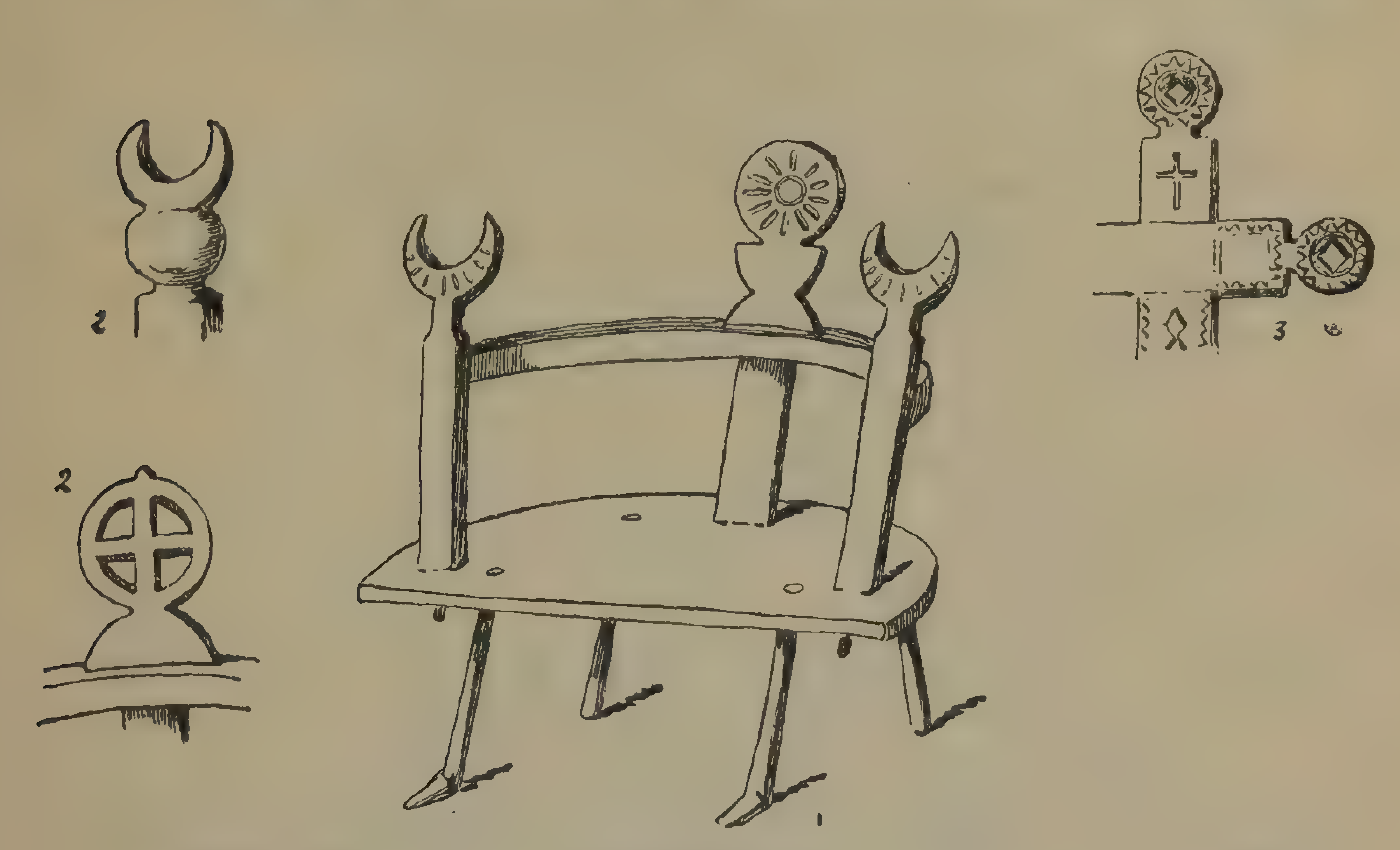
Albanian traditional carving patterns on chairs and graves, drawn by Edith Durham in the early 20th century. They are representations of the Sun (Dielli) and the Moon (Hana), sometimes also rayed (symbolizing their light).

Prehistoric Illyrian symbols used on funeral monuments of the pre-Roman period have been used also in Roman times and continued into late antiquity in the broad Illyrian territory. The same motifs were kept with identical cultural-religious symbolism on various monuments of the early medieval culture of the Albanians. They appear also on later funerary monuments, including the medieval tombstones (stećci) in Bosnia and Herzegovina and the burial monuments used until recently in northern Albania, Kosovo, Montenegro, southern Serbia and northern North Macedonia. Such motifs are particularly related to the ancient cults of the Sun and Moon, survived until recently among northern Albanians.

The Illyrian Roman emperor Aurelian, whose mother was a priestess of the Sun, promoted the Sun – Sol Invictus – as the chief god of the Roman Empire. Among the Illyrians of early Albania the Sun was a widespread symbol. The spread of a Sun cult and the persistence of Sun motifs into the Roman period and later are considered to have been the product of the Illyrian culture. In Christian iconography the symbol of the Sun is associated with immortality and a right to rule. The pagan cult of the Sun was almost identical to the Christian cult in the first centuries of Christianity. Varieties of the symbols of the Sun that Christian orders brought in the region found in the Albanian highlands sympathetic supporters, enriching the body of their symbols with new material.

== Cult, practices, beliefs, and mythology ==
=== Symbolism ===
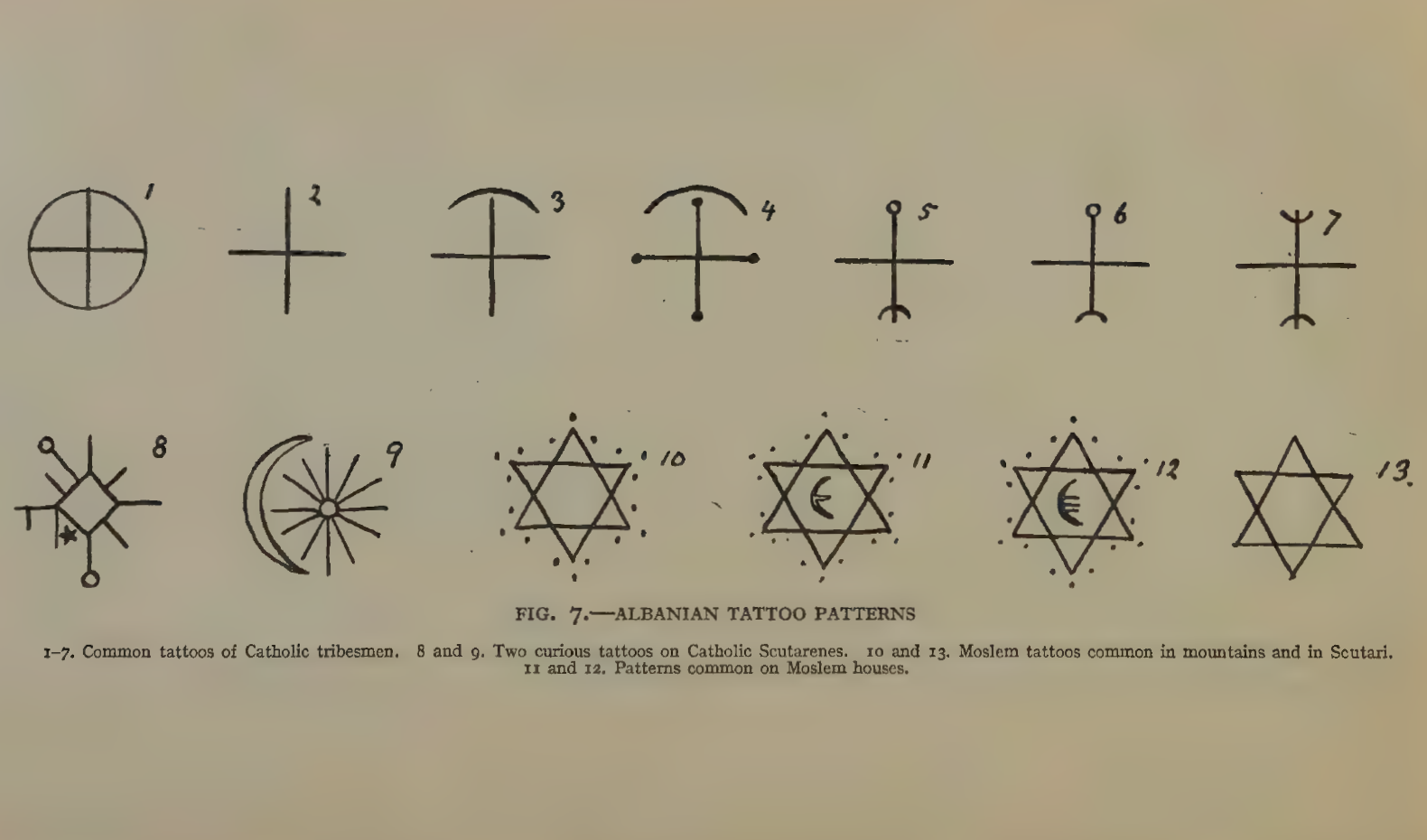
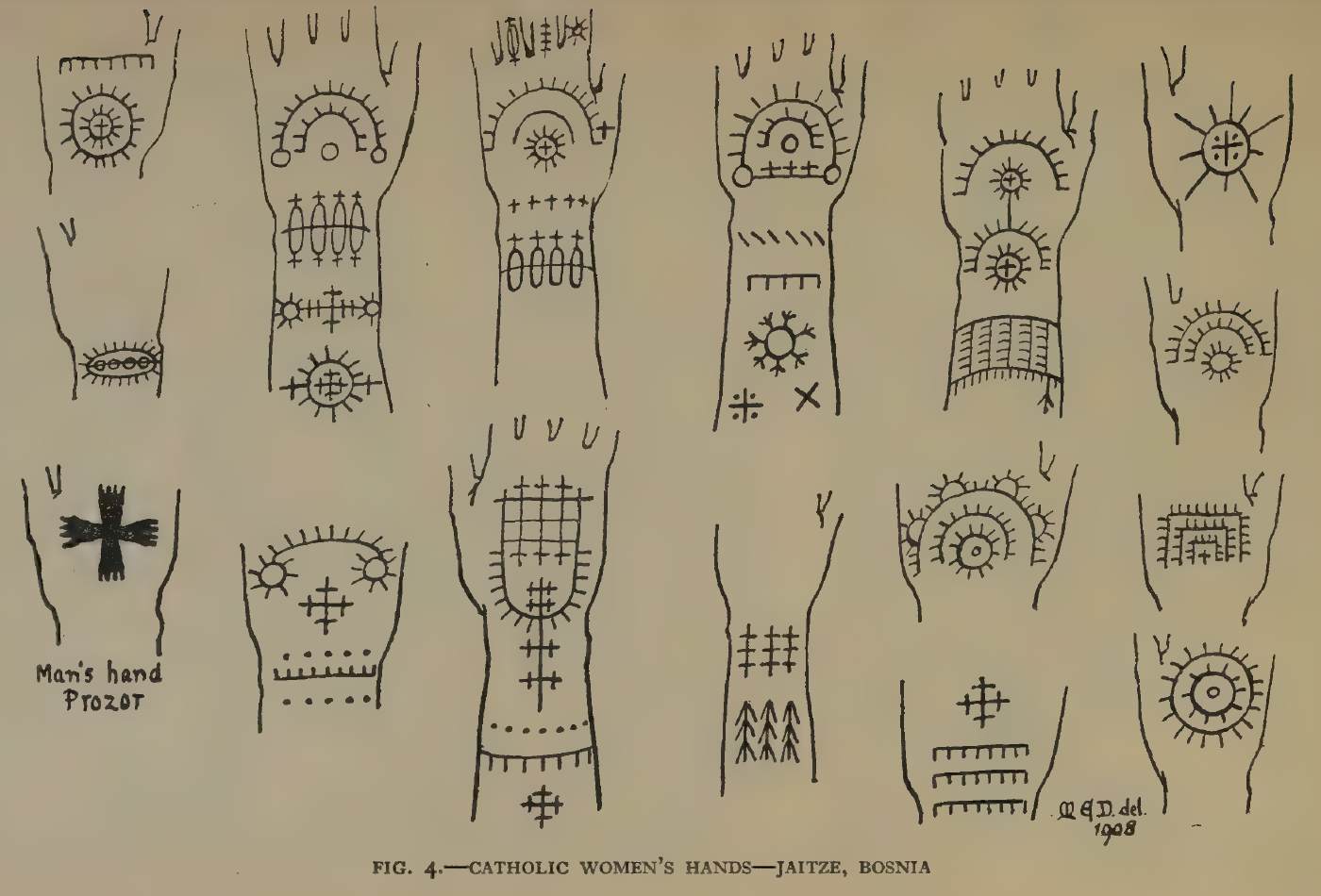
Tattoo patterns of northern Albanians (top); tattoo patterns of Catholic women (and one man) in Bosnia (bottom). Drawn by Edith Durham in the early 20th century. Many of those patterns also appear on Albanian traditional art (graves, jewellery, embroidery, and house carvings). They are symbols of celestial, light, fire and hearth worship, expressing the favor of the light within the dualistic struggle between light and darkness.

The symbolization of the cult of the Sun, which is often combined with the crescent Moon, is commonly found in a variety of contexts of Albanian folk art, including traditional tattooing, grave art, jewellery, embroidery, and house carvings. They are symbols of celestial, light, fire and hearth worship, expressing the favor of the light within the dualistic struggle between light and darkness in Albanian mythology.

Edith Durham, who extensively studied Balkan traditional tattoing with fieldwork research, was able to thoroughly explain the patterns of traditional tattoos only after asking to Albanians of Thethi–Shala for a description of all the little lines (or twigs) that accompanied a semicircle incised on an old gravestone. They answered that those twigs were "the light coming from the Moon, of course". For Albanians, the twigs or little lines were the traditional way to represent light, emanated from the Sun (Dielli) and from the Moon (Hëna), which was often represented as a crescent. So, the patterns of Catholic tattoos in Bosnia, which until then were known as "circles, semicircles, and lines or twigs", eventually were clearly explained as compounds of rayed (emanating light) suns, moons, and crosses, from an expression of Nature-worship and hearth-worship. Furthermore, the crosses (including swastikas) have been explained by scholars as symbols of the deified Fire – Zjarri, and in particular of the fire god Enji.

=== Solemn oaths, good omens, and curse formulas ===
Albanians often swear solemn oaths (be) "by the sun" (për atë diell), "by the sun who lights up the earth" (Për atë diell që shndrit token!), "by the sun who makes the sky cloudy or clears it up" (Për atë diell që vran e kthiell!), "by the sun who got tired" (për atë diell që vete lodhur!), "by the face of the sun" (për atë fytyrë të diellit!), "by the eye-sun" (për atë sy diell), "by that big eye, who sees everything" ("për atë symadh, që i sheh të gjitha), "by the eye of the sun" (për sy të diellit), "by the star" (për atë hyll), "by the ray of light" (për këtë rreze drite) and "by the sunbeam" (për këtë rreze dielli).

An expression of good omen is "be as white as the light of the sun!" (qofsh i bardhë si drita e diellit!).

Curse formulas include "be slaughered by the ray of the sun" (të thertë rrezja e diellit!) and "don't see the sun ever again" (mos pafsh diell me sy!).

=== Dualistic worldview, cosmic renewal ===
Albanian beliefs, myths and legends are organized around the dualistic struggle between good and evil, light and darkness, which cyclically produces the cosmic renewal.

In Albanian tradition the Sun is referred to as "the Beauty of the Sky" (i Bukuri i Qiellit). During the ceremonial ritual of celebration of the first day of spring (Albanian: Dita e Verës) that marks the beginning of the period of the year when daylight prevails over night, "the Beauty of the Sky" is the human who is dressed in yellow personifying the Sun, worshiped as the god of light and giver of life, who fades away the darkness of the world and melts the frost. To celebrate Dita e Verës bonfires are traditionally lit by Albanians in yards everywhere, especially on high places, with the function to drive away the darkness of the winter season allowing nature's renewal and for the strengthening of the Sun.

The most famous Albanian mythological representation of the dualistic struggle between good and evil, light and darkness, is the constant battle between drangue and kulshedra, a conflict that symbolises the cyclic return in the watery and chthonian world of death, accomplishing the cosmic renewal of rebirth. The legendary battle of a heroic deity associated with thunder and weather – like drangue – who fights and slays a huge multi-headed serpent associated with water, storms, and drought – like kulshedra – is a common motif of Indo-European mythology. The original legend may have symbolized the Chaoskampf, a clash between forces of order and chaos. In Albanian tradition the clash between drangue and kulshedra, light and darkness, is furthermore seen as a mythological representation of the cult of the Sun and the Moon, widely observed in Albanian traditional tattooing.

In Albanian mythology and folklore, the supremacy of the deity of the sky over that of the underworld is symbolized by the victory of celestial divine heroes against kulshedra (often described as an earthly/chthonic deity or demon). Those celestial divine heroes are often drangue (the most widespread culture hero among Albanians), but also E Bija e Hënës dhe e Diellit ("the Daughter of the Moon and the Sun") who is described as pika e qiellit ("drop of the sky" or "lightning"), which falls everywhere from heaven on the mountains and the valleys and strikes pride and evil, or by other heroic characters marked in their bodies by the symbols of celestial objects, such as Zjermi (lit. "the Fire"), who notably is born with the Sun on his forehead.

=== Fire and hearth ===
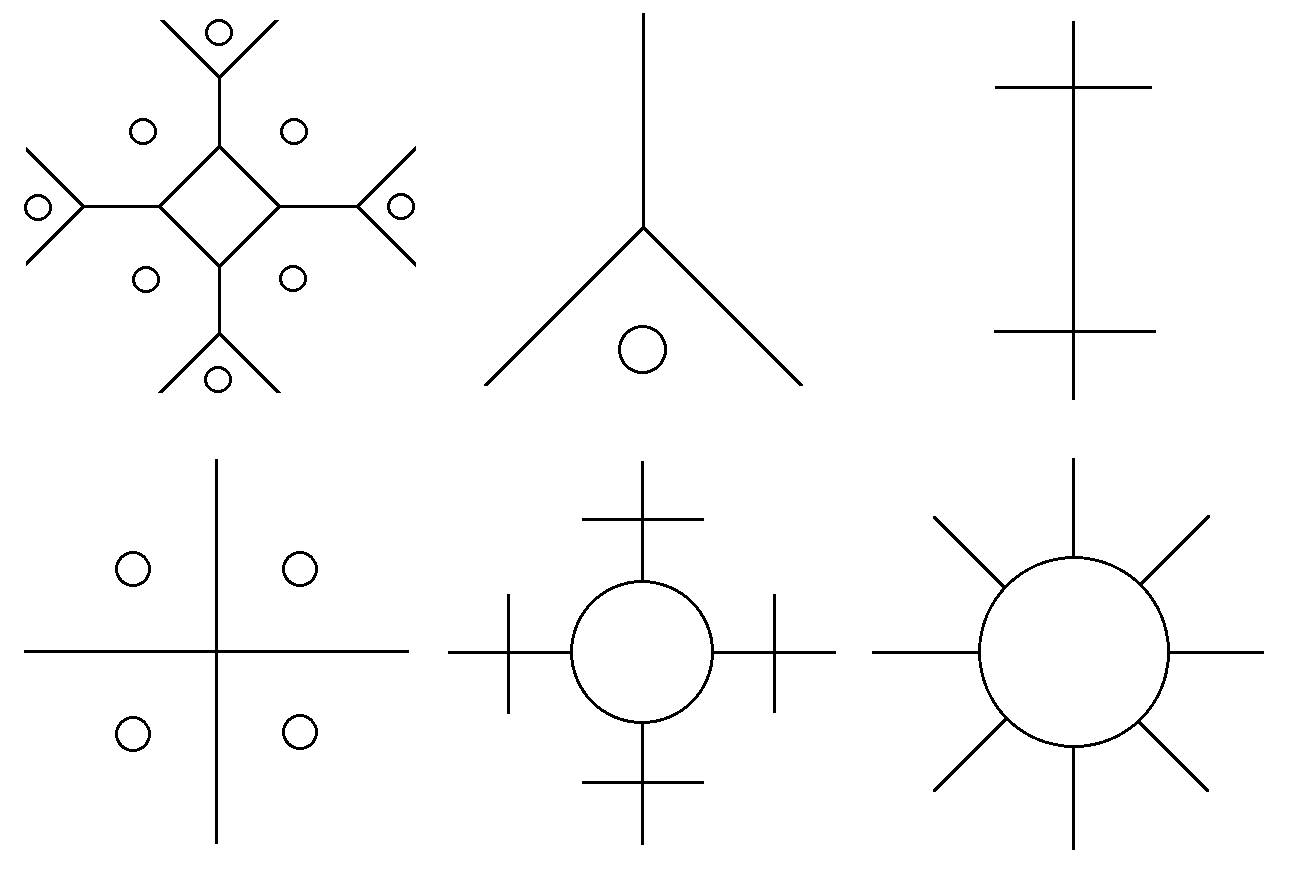
Sun and Fire (Zjarri) symbols in Albanian traditional tattoo patterns (19th century). The cross (also swastika in some tattoos) is the Albanian traditional way to represent the deified Fire – Zjarri, evidently also called with the theonym Enji.

In Albanian tradition the fire worship and rituals are particularly related to the cult of the Sun. Calendar fires (Albanian: zjarret e vitit) are associated with the cosmic cycle and the rhythms of agricultural and pastoral life. The practices associated with ritual fires among Albanians have been historically fought by the Christian clergy, without success.

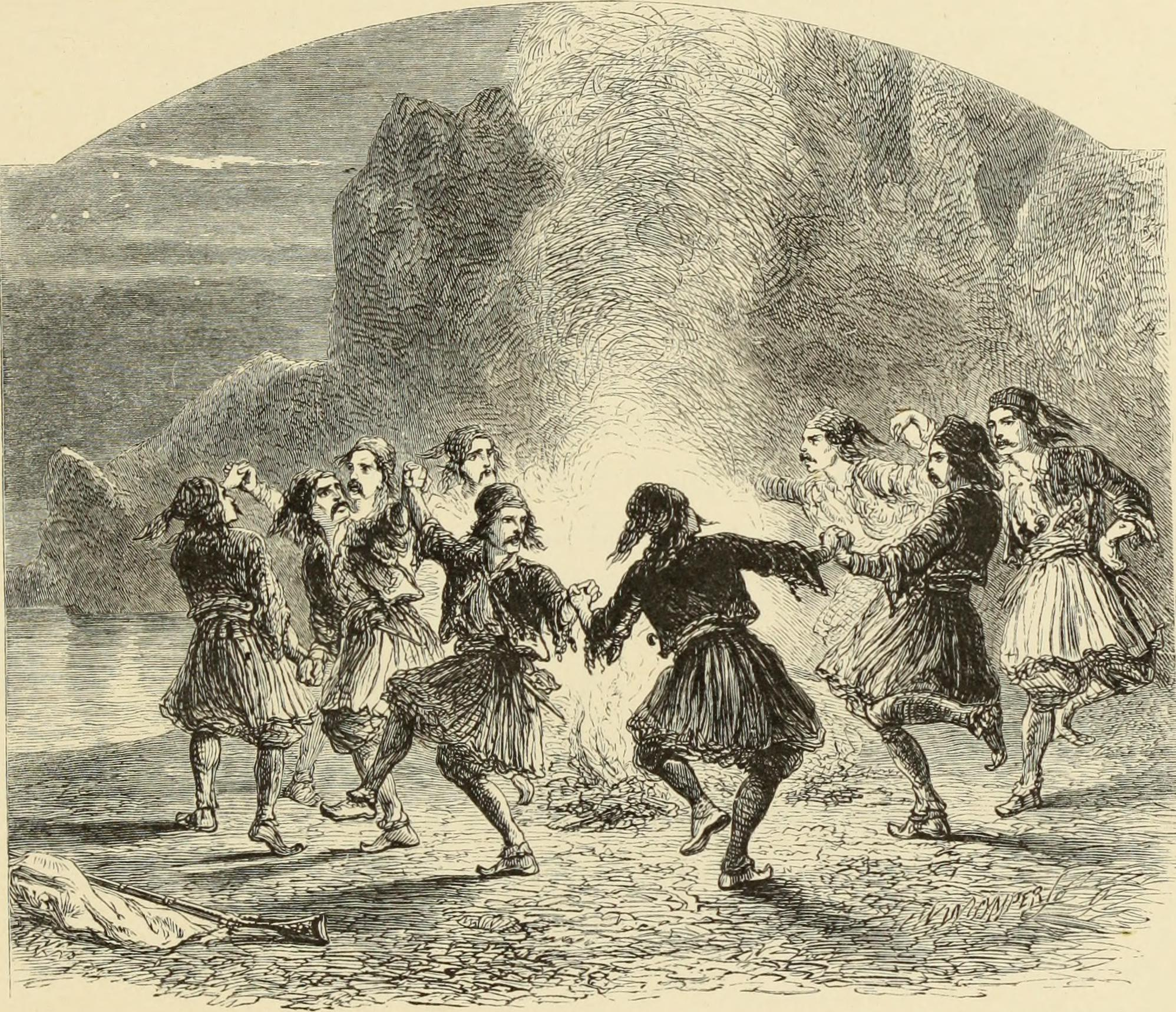
Albanian warrior dance in circle around fire (zjarri), drawing from the book Childe Harold's Pilgrimage written by Lord Byron in the early 19th century. Practiced for several hours with very short intervals, the dance gets new vigour from the words of the accompanying song that starts with a battle cry invoking war drums, and which is of a piece with the movement and usually changed only once or twice during the whole performance. The ritual purifying fire is traditionally used by Albanians, in particular singing and dancing around it, to gain protection and energizing from its supernatural power.

The ritual collective fires (based on the house, kinship, or neighborhood) or bonfires in yards (especially on high places) lit to celebrate the main traditional Albanian festivities before sunrise are related to the cult of the Sun, and in particular they are practiced with the function to give strength to the Sun and to ward off evil according to the old beliefs.

A typical ritual practiced before sunrise during major traditional festivities such as Dita e Verës (Verëza) or Shëngjergji in the Opojë region consists in young people performing a dance on the "way of the Sun", in the east–west direction near the burning ritual fire, with which evil spirits, demons that endanger health, purification, prosperity, blessing and the beginning of the seasons are burned.

Another ritual practiced during Dita e Verës in the Korçë region and called "Spring ritual" has been described as follows:

"In the closed circle dance, having the fire in the center, the first ritual element is found, interlaced with choreographic motives, which classify this dance in the ritual category. The cult of fire, an important basic and ancient element, and the closed circle of the performers, a very important fact for the ritualistic choreography, create the main axis of the dance."

In Albanian pagan beliefs the fire hearth (vatra e zjarrit) is the symbol of fire as the offspring of the Sun. The place of the ignition of fire is traditionally built in the center of the house and of circular shape representing the Sun. Traditionally the fire of the hearth is identified with the existence of the family and it is worshiped as a deity (hyjni/perëndi të zjarrit të vatrës). Its extinguishing is regarded as a bad omen for the family.

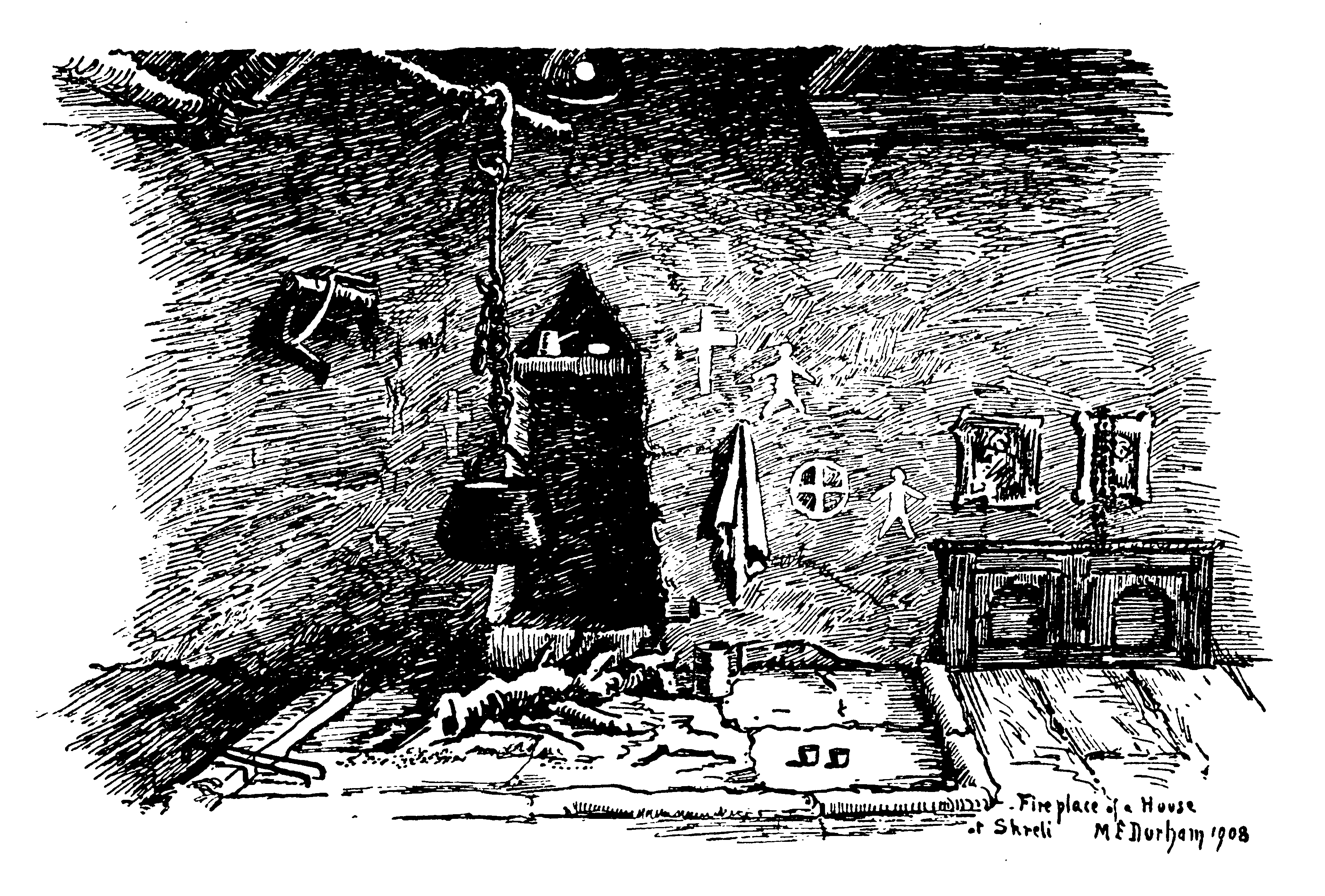
Fireplace (votër) of a house of Shkreli (early 19th century).

On the feast of Verëza, in Opojë girls go from house to house early in the morning, and two by two they go near the fire of the hearth and stir it saying to the lady of the house: Oj e zonja shpisë a e qite renin e flisë. Meanwhile, the lady of the house gives them two chicken eggs. In the morning of Verëza and Shëngjergji, the old lady of the house ties knots to the chain of the hearth and says an incantation formula, then she lights the fire, which with all its power burns the demons and evil.

Ashes are believed to have healing properties, especially when children have been taken by the evil eye they are washed on the ashes.

=== Death and burial practices ===
When somebody dies Albanians use to say: iu fik Dielli "the Sun went out for them".

According to Albanian tradition, when a person dies, they must be positioned always facing the sunrise: at home, in the yard, when resting on the way to the cemetery, as well as in the grave. This is a definite rule that finds continuity in archaeological material throughout the Middle Ages and Illyrian times. Another common practice consists in making a circle of small white stones outside the grave, also associated with the cult of the Sun. This tradition too finds echoes in Illyrian times, when a ring of stones was placed around the tumulus. (Note: Those traditions have also been found among other European peoples. Besides being rituals for the cult of the Sun, they could have been mythic-ritualistic practices to preserve the memory of the ancestral migrations from the east, the original homeland of the Indo-European peoples in the Pontic–Caspian steppe.)

=== Mountain tops and pilgrimages ===
The old pagan cult of the mountain and mountain tops is widespread among Albanians. Pilgrimages to sacred mountains take place regularly during the year. This ancient practice is still preserved today, notably in Tomorr, Pashtrik, Lybeten, Gjallicë, Rumia, Koritnik, Shkëlzen, Mount Krujë, Shelbuem, Këndrevicë, Maja e Hekurave, Shëndelli and many others. In Albanian folk beliefs the mountain worship is strictly related to the cult of Nature in general, and the cult of the Sun in particular. Prayers to the Sun, ritual bonfires, and animal sacrifices have been common practices performed by Albanians during the ritual pilgrimages on mountain tops.

Shëndelli ("Holy Sun") is an Albanian common oronym (such as Shëndelli in Tepelenë, Shëndelli in Mallakastër, Shëndelli in the Albanian Ionian Sea Coast, etc.), which has been given to mountains in association with the cult of the mountain peaks and the cult of the Sun.

The "Mountains of the Sun" (Bjeshkët e Diellit) are the places where the heroes (Kreshnikët) operate in the Kângë Kreshnikësh, the legendary cycle of Albanian epic poetry.

=== Sunrise – healing and energizing ===
Albanians believe that seeing the sunrise gives energy and heals the body. For this reasons many rituals are practiced before and during sunrise, honoring this moment of the day.

In the Albanian Ionian Sea Coast, a healing ritual is traditionally performed before sunrise by the mothers, who take a crown of flowers, go out into nature, look at the sky and see a bird flying. They mention the names of the ill children and other family members, and when the bird flies towards the east where the Sun rises they throw the crown up, saying three times:

"Zog, o zog i bukur-o
Gjer në Diell fluturo
Na të rëndën,
Nëm të letën
Na të sermën,
Nëm të artën"

Gjer në Diell fluturo means "fly to the Sun"; Na të rëndën means "take the illness" and Nëm të letën means "give the health". So it is believed that the bird, through the Sun, will provide health to the children and other family members. Na të sermën means "take the precious metals (silver)" and Nëm të artën means "give the prosperity and wealth".

The rise of the Sun as a very important moment is traditionally considered decisive and honored in the ritual for the arrival of the milk of post-partum women who had run out of breast milk: the women, accompanied by their mother-in-law or an old woman, goes near a fig tree at the time of sunrise, and the old woman facing the see shakes a fig branch saying three times:

"'Un' e tund fiknë,
fiku tund dhenë,
Dheu tund denë (detin)
Të m'i kthej' nuses bulmenë

=== Rainmaking and soil fertility rituals ===
According to Albanian folk beliefs, the Sun makes the sky cloudy or clears it up. Albanians used to invoke the Sun with rainmaking and soil fertility rituals.

In rainmaking rituals from the Albanian Ionian Sea Coast, Albanians used to pray to the Sun, in particular facing Mount Shëndelli (Mount "Holy Sun"). Children used to dress a boy with fresh branches, calling him dordolec. A typical invocation song repeated three times during the ritual was:

"O Ilia, Ilia,
Peperuga rrugëzaj
Bjerë shi o Perëndi,
Se qajnë ca varfëri,
Me lot e logori
Thekëri gjer mbë çati,
Gruri gjer në Perëndi."

Afterwards, people used to say: Do kemi shi se u nxi Shëndëlliu ("We will have rain because Shëndëlliu went dark").

The Sun used to be also invoked when reappearing after the rain, prayed for increased production in agriculture. A documented invocation song was:

"Diell-o, Diell ti,
Aman millona, aman mullixhi,
Bluajm bereqetin, të shkoj në shtëpi,
Bluaje të butë, si për bakllava,
Bluaje të butë, si për trahana."

Another documented invocation song was:

"Diell-o, Diell-o,
Hidhna një thes miell-o,
Të martojmë lalënë,
Lalë këmbëçalënë,
Që na bëri djalënë,
Në krie të vatrësë."

=== The all-seeing eye ===
In Albanian tradition the Sun is referred to as an "eye". According to folk beliefs, the Sun is all-seeing, with a single glance he possesses the ability to see the entire surface of the Earth. The Sun, referred to as "the all-seeing (big) eye" is invoked in solemn oaths (be), and information about everything that happens on Earth is asked to the all-seeing Sun in ritual songs, such as:

"- Diell, Diell,
të jap një kupë miell
mos ke parë bukurien?
- Bukuria pas mua shkoi,
as më pa, as më shikoi."

The Albanian oath taken "by the eye-sun", "by that big eye, who sees everything", "by the eye of the sun", "by the star", etc., is a reflection of the Indo-European belief according to which the Sun is the eye of the Sky-God *Di̯ḗu̯s (Zojz in Albanian tradition).

=== Animal sacrifices for building ===
Animal sacrifices for new buildings is a pagan practice widespread among Albanians. At the beginning of the construction of the new house, the foundation traditionally starts with prayers, in a 'lucky day', facing the Sun, starting after sunrise, during the growing Moon, and an animal is slaughered as a sacrifice.

The practice continues with variations depending on the Albanian ethnographic area. For instance in Opojë the sacrificed animal is placed on the foundation, with its head placed towards the east, where the Sun rises. In Brataj the blood of the sacrificed animal is poured during the slaughter in the corner that was on the east side, where the Sun rises; in order for the house to stand and for good luck, the owner of the house throws silver or golden coins in the same corner of the house; the lady of the house throws there unwashed wool. These things are to remain buried in the foundation of the house that is being built. The relatives of the house owner throw money on the foundation of the house as well, but that money is taken by the craftsman who builds the house. In Dibra a ram is slaughered at the foundation, and the head of the ram is placed on the foundation. In the Lezha highlands a ram or a rooster is slaughered on the foundation and then their heads are buried there; the owners of the house throw coins as well as seeds of different plants on the foundation.

=== Food ===
Some Albanian traditional food is prepared in the shape of the Sun, such as ballokume, a cookie originating in the city of Elbasan in central Albania but very popular among Albanians, and flia (meaning "sacrifice"), a northern Albanian dish. They are traditionally prepared and eaten during Dita e Verës or Verëza – an Albanian pagan spring festival, celebrated by all Albanians (also officially in Albania) for the spring equinox. It is assumed that flia began to be prepared by Albanians for Verëza as a sacrifice to the Sun-god.

== Traditional festivals ==
=== Winter solstice ===
Albanian traditional festivities around the winter solstice celebrate the return of the Sun for summer and the lengthening of the days.

The Albanian traditional rites during the winter solstice period are pagan, and very ancient. Albanologist Johann Georg von Hahn (1811 – 1869) reported that clergy, during his time and before, have vigorously fought the pagan rites that were practiced by Albanians to celebrate this festivity, but without success.

The old rites of this festivity were accompanied by collective fires based on the house, kinship or neighborhood, a practice performed in order to give strength to the Sun according to the old beliefs. The rites related to the cult of vegetation, which expressed the desire for increased production in agriculture and animal husbandry, were accompanied by animal sacrifices to the fire, lighting pine trees at night, luck divination tests with crackling in the fire or with coins in ritual bread, making and consuming ritual foods, performing various magical ritualistic actions in livestock, fields, vineyards and orchards, and so on.

Nata e Buzmit

Nata e Buzmit, "Yule log's night", is celebrated between December 22 and January 6. Buzmi is a ritualistic piece of wood (or several pieces of wood) that is put to burn in the fire of the hearth (Albanian vatër) on the night of a winter celebration that falls after the return of the Sun for summer (after the winter solstice), sometimes on the night of Kërshëndella on December 24 (Christmas Eve), sometimes on the night of kolendra, or sometimes on New Year's Day or on any other occasion around the same period, a tradition that is originally related to the cult of the Sun.

A series of rituals of a magical character are performed with the buzmi, which, based on old beliefs, aims at agricultural plant growth and for the prosperity of production in the living thing (production of vegetables, trees, vineyards, etc.). This practice has been traditionally found among all Albanians, also documented among the Arbëreshë in Italy and the Arvanites in Greece until the first half of the 20th century, and it is still preserved in remote Albanian ethnographic regions today. It is considered a custom of Proto-Indo-European origin.

The richest set of rites related to buzmi are found in northern Albania (Mirdita, Pukë, Dukagjin, Malësia e Madhe, Shkodër and Lezhë, as well as in Kosovo, Dibër and so on.

=== Spring equinox ===
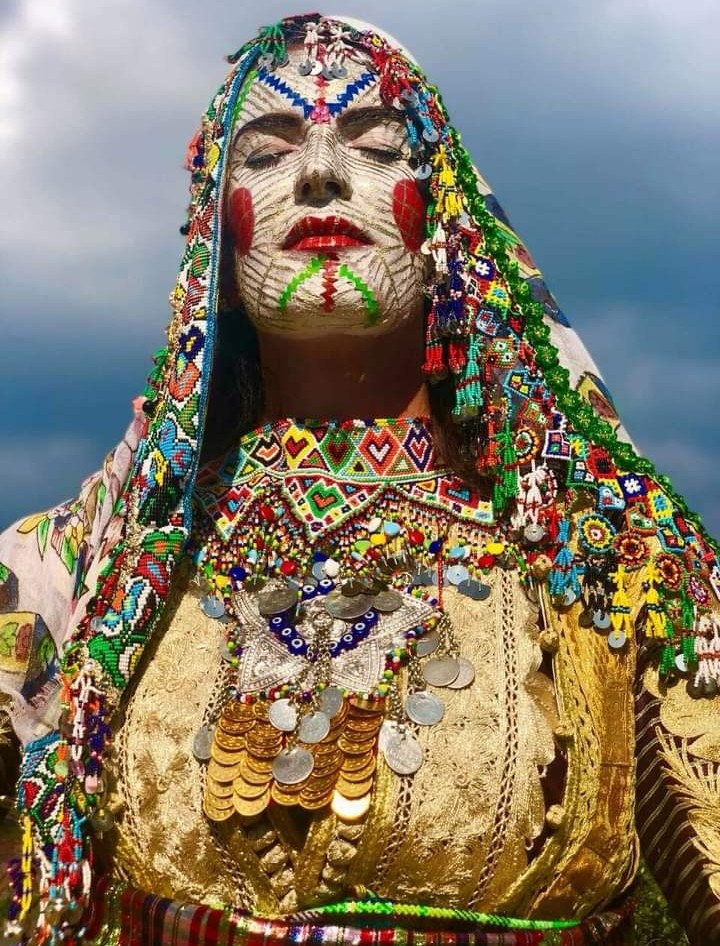
Albanian woman with traditional decorations, during the Illyrian carnivals, celebrating the Albanian spring festival in the Sharr Mountains.

Dita e Verës is an Albanian pagan holiday celebrated (also officially in Albania) on March 1 of the Julian calendar, the first day of the new year (which is March 14 in the Gregorian calendar). In the old Albanian calendar, Verëza corresponds to the first three days of the new year (Albanian: Kryeviti, Kryet e Motmotit, Motmoti i Ri, Nata e Mojit) and marks the end of the winter season (the second half of the year) and the beginning of the "summer" season (the first half of the year) on the spring equinox, the period of the year when daylight is longer than night. It is celebrated both in the Northern and Southern regions, but with regional differences. Bonfires are traditionally lit in yards everywhere, especially on high places, with the function to drive away the darkness of the winter season and for the strengthening of the Sun.

Edith Durham – who collected Albanian ethnographic material from northern Albania and Montenegro – reported that Albanian traditional tattooing of girls was practiced on March 19, which falls in the days of the spring celebrations.

=== Summer solstice ===
The summer solstice is celebrated by Albanians often with the name Shën Gjini–Shën Gjoni, but also with the name Festa e Malit or Festa e Bjeshkës ("Mountain Feast"), as well as Festa e Blegtorisë ("Livestock Feast"). It is associated with the production in agricultural and livestock activities.

To celebrate this feast, bonfires are traditionally lit where straw is burned and ashes are thrown on the ground, as a "burning for regeneration" ritual. Tribal or community fires are traditionally made with straw, with people jumping across them. In some regions plumes of burning chaff were carried in the air, running through the fields and hills. The ashes of the straw that burned in the ritual fires of this event are traditionally thrown to the field for good luck.

During this feast sheep shearing is traditionally performed by shepherds.

== Sun-related mythological figures and objects ==
=== The Mother of the Sun ===
Nëna e Diellit ("the Mother of the Sun" or "the Sun's Mother") is a mother goddess in Albanian folk beliefs. A sacred ritual called "the funeral of the Sun's Mother" was very widespread in southeastern Albania until the 20th century. She has been described by scholars as a heaven goddess and a goddess of agriculture, livestock, and earth fertility, as suggested by the sacred ritual dedicated to her.

Nëna e Diellit also appears as a personified deity in Albanian folk tales.

=== The Daughter of the Moon and the Sun ===
E Bija e Hënës dhe e Diellit, "the Daughter of the Moon and the Sun", is a light divine heroine that appears in Albanian folklore, referred to as pika e qiellit ("drop of the sky" or "lightning"), which falls everywhere from heaven on the mountains and the valleys and strikes pride and evil. She defeats the kulshedra, the archetype of darkness and evil in Albanian mythology. In some Albanian traditions the Sun and the Moon are regarded as husband and wife, and in others as brother and sister. In the case of E Bija e Hënës dhe e Diellit the Sun is her father and the Moon is her mother.

=== Zjermi and The Temple of the Sun ===
Zjermi or Zjerma (lit. "the Fire", see Zjarri) is the name of one of the twin protagonists of the Albanian folk tale The Twins. He is born in particular conditions and with the Sun on his forehead, while his twin brother – Handa – with the Moon on his forehead. After separating from his brother in roads that are chosen by their horses, Zjermi, while approaching the Temple of the Sun during his journey, learns from an old man that kulshedra (a demon of darkness and evil) has blocked the source of the river leaving the city in drought. In exchange for releasing the water, the kulshedra has requested and obtained a sacrificial offering of a beautiful maiden daily to her. Eventually Zjermi slays the kulshedra with his silver sword and frees the king's daughter who has been offered as the daily sacrifice to the monster – Bardhakuqja, who eventually marries Zjermi. Zjermi also rescues his brother Handa and other heroes who have been petrified by the shtriga in their attempt to find and reach e Bukura e Dheut ("the Earthly Beauty").

In a variant of the tale, before reaching the city that is harmed by the kulshedra, Zjermi rescues a drangue called Zef. Zjermi and Zef become blood brothers, and when Zjermi fights the kulshedra, Zef and other drangues come in his aid striking the kulshedra with thunders and weakening her before she is slain by Zjermi.

== Bibliography ==
- Belgiorno de Stefano, Maria Gabriella (2014). "La coesistenza delle religioni in Albania. Le religioni in Albania prima e dopo la caduta del comunismo". Stato, Chiese e Pluralismo Confessionale (in Italian) (6). ISSN 1971-8543.
- Bovan, Vlladimir (1985). "Branisllav Kërstiq, Indeks motiva narodnih pesama balkanskih Slovena SANU, Beograd 1984". Gjurmime Albanologjike: Folklor Dhe Etnologji (in Albanian). 15. Albanological Institute of Prishtina.
- Brahaj, Jaho (2007). Flamuri i Kombit Shqiptar: origjina, lashtësia. Enti Botues "Gjergj Fishta". ISBN 9789994338849.
- Crăciun, Radu (2023). "Diellina, një bimë trako-dake me emër proto-albanoid" [Diellina, a Thracian-Dacian plant with a Proto-Albanoid name]. Studime Filologjike (1–2). Centre of Albanological Studies: 77–83. doi:10.62006/sf.v1i1-2.3089. ISSN 0563-5780.
- Cook, Arthur Bernard (1964) [1914]. Zeus: Zeus, god of the bright sky. Zeus: A Study in Ancient Religion. Vol. 1. Biblo and Tannen.
- Daum, Werner (1998). Albanien zwischen Kreuz und Halbmond. Staatliches Museum für Völkerkunde. ISBN 9783701624614.
- Demiraj, Bardhyl; Neri, Sergio (2020). "díell -i". Wörterbuch – DPEWA. DPEWA - Digitales Philologisch-Etymologisches Wörterbuch des Altalbanischen.
- Dobruna-Salihu, Exhlale (2005). "Cult symbols and images on funerary monuments of the Roman Period in the central section in Dardania". In M. Sanadaer, A. Rendić-Miočević (ed.). Religija i mit kao poticaj rimskoj provincijalnoj plastici. Akti VIII. međunarodnog kolokvija o problemima rimskog provincijalnog umjetničkog stvaralaštva / Religion and myth as an impetus for the Roman provincial sculpture. The Proceedings of the 8th International Colloquium on Problems of Roman Provincial Art. Golden marketing-Tehniéka knjiga. Odsjek za arheologiju Filozofskog fakulteta u Zagrebu. pp. 343–350. ISBN 953-212-242-7.
- Doja, Albert [in Albanian] (2005), "Mythology and Destiny" (PDF), Anthropos, 100 (2): 449–462, doi:10.5771/0257-9774-2005-2-449, JSTOR 40466549
- Durham, Edith (1928a). High Albania. LO Beacon Press. ISBN 978-0-8070-7035-2.
- Durham, Edith (1928b). Some tribal origins, laws and customs of the Balkans.
- Dushi, Arbnora (2020). "The Sister-Brother Recognition Motif in the Albanian Folk Ballad: Meaning and Contexts within the National Culture". Tautosakos Darbai. 59: 17–29. doi:10.51554/TD.2020.28363. S2CID 253540847.
- Egro, Dritan (2003). Islam in Albanian Lands During the First Two Centuries of the Ottoman Rule. Department of History of Bilkent University.
- Elsie, Robert (1994). Albanian Folktales and Legends. Naim Frashëri Publishing Company. Archived from the original (pdf) on 2009-07-28.
- Elsie, Robert (2001). A Dictionary of Albanian Religion, Mythology and Folk Culture. London: Hurst & Company. ISBN 1-85065-570-7.
- Fishta, Gjergj; Lambertz, Maximilian (1958). "Die Laute des Hochlandes (Lahuta e malcis)". Südosteuropäische Arbeiten. 51. R. Oldenbourg. ISSN 0933-6850.
- Galaty, Michael; Lafe, Ols; Lee, Wayne; Tafilica, Zamir (2013). Light and Shadow: Isolation and Interaction in the Shala Valley of Northern Albania. The Cotsen Institute of Archaeology Press. ISBN 978-1931745710.
- Gjoni, Irena (2012). Marrëdhënie të miteve dhe kulteve të bregdetit të Jonit me areale të tjera mitike (PhD) (in Albanian). Tirana: University of Tirana, Faculty of History and Philology.
- Golan, Ariel (1991). Myth and Symbol: Symbolism in Prehistoric Religions. A. Golan. ISBN 9789652222459.
- Golan, Ariel (2003). Prehistoric Religion: Mythology, Symbolism. A. Golan. ISBN 9789659055500.
- Hyllested, Adam; Joseph, Brian D. (2022). "Albanian". In Olander, Thomas (ed.). The Indo-European Language Family : A Phylogenetic Perspective. Cambridge University Press. pp. 223–245. doi:10.1017/9781108758666. ISBN 9781108758666. S2CID 161016819.
- Hysi, Shyqyri (2006). "Kulte tradicionale shqiptare" [Albanian Traditional Cults]. Gjurmime Albanologjike - Folklor Dhe Etnologji (in Albanian) (36). Instituti Albanologjik i Prishtinës: 349–361.
- Koch, Harold (2015). "Patterns in the diffusion of nomenclature systems: Australian subsections in comparison to European days of the week". In Dag T.T. Haug (ed.). Historical Linguistics 2013: Selected papers from the 21st International Conference on Historical Linguistics, Oslo, 5-9 August 2013. Current Issues in Linguistic Theory. Vol. 334. With the assistance of: Eiríkur Kristjánsson. John Benjamins Publishing Company. ISBN 978-90-272-6818-1.
- Krasniqi, Shensi (2014). "Pilgrimages in mountains in Kosovo". Revista Santuários, Cultura, Arte, Romarias, Peregrinações, Paisagens e Pessoas. ISSN 2183-3184.
- Lambertz, Maximilian (1922). Albanische Märchen (und andere Texte zur albanischen Volkskunde). Wien: A. Hölder.
- Lambertz, Maximilian (1952). Die geflügelte Schwester und die Dunklen der Erde: Albanische Volksmärchen. Das Gesicht der Völker (in German). Vol. 9. Im Erich.
- Lambertz, Maximilian (1949). Gjergj Fishta und das albanische Heldenepos Lahuta e Malcís, Laute des Hochlandes: eine Einführung in die albanische Sagenwelt. O. Harrassowitz.
- Lelaj, Olsi (2015). "Mbi tatuazhin në shoqërinë shqiptare" [On Tattoo in the Albanian Society]. Kultura Popullore. 34 (71–72). Centre of Albanological Studies: 91–118. ISSN 2309-5717.
- Lurker, Manfred (2005). The Routledge Dictionary of Gods and Goddesses, Devils and Demons. Routledge, Taylor & Francis. ISBN 0-203-64351-8.
- Murray-Aynsley, J. C. (1891). "Swastika". Ars Quatuor Coronatorum. IV.
- Neziri, Zeqirja (2015). Lirika gojore shqiptare (in Albanian). Skopje: Interlingua. ISBN 978-9989-173-52-3.
- Pipa, Arshi (1993). "The Mythology of Albania". In Bonnefoy, Yves (ed.). American, African, and Old European mythologies. University of Chicago Press. ISBN 0-226-06457-3.
- Poghirc, Cicerone (1987). "Albanian Religion". In Mircea Eliade (ed.). The Encyclopedia of Religion. Vol. 1. New York: MacMillan Publishing Co. pp. 178–180.
- Qafleshi, Muharrem (2011). Opoja dhe Gora ndër shekuj [Opoja and Gora During Centuries]. Albanological Institute of Pristina. ISBN 978-9951-596-51-0.
- Schirò, Giuseppe (1923). Canti tradizionali ed altri saggi delle colonie albanesi di Sicilia [Traditional Songs and other Essays from the Albanian Colonies of Sicily] (in Albanian and Italian). Stab. tip. L. Pierro.
- Sela, Jonida (2017). "Values and Traditions in Ritual Dances of All-Year Celebrations in Korça Region, Albania". International Conference "Education and Cultural Heritage". Vol. 1. Association of Heritage and Education. pp. 62–71.
- Shuteriqi, Dhimitër S. (1959). Historia e letërsisë shqipe. Vol. 1. Universiteti Shtetëror i Tiranës, Instituti i Historisë dhe Gjuhësisë.
- Søborg, Tobias Mosbæk (2020). Sigmatic Verbal Formations in Anatolian and Indo-European: A Cladistic Study (Thesis). University of Copenhagen, Department of Nordic Studies and Linguistics.
- Sokoli, Ramadan (2000). Gojëdhana e përrallëza të botës shqiptare. Toena. ISBN 9789992713198.
- Sokoli, Ramadan (2013) [1999]. "The Albanian World in the Folk Teller's Stories". In Margaret Read MacDonald (ed.). Traditional Storytelling Today: An International Sourcebook. Translated by Pranvera Xhelo. Routledge. ISBN 9781135917142.
- Steiner-Karafili, Enit (2010). "Byron and the Albanians: Unearthing Identities". Studia Albanica (2): 137–147. ISSN 0585-5047.
- Stipčević, Aleksandar (1974). The Illyrians: history and culture (1977 ed.). Noyes Press. ISBN 978-0815550525.
- Tirta, Mark (2004). Petrit Bezhani (ed.). Mitologjia ndër shqiptarë (in Albanian). Tirana: Mësonjëtorja. ISBN 99927-938-9-9.
- Treimer, Karl (1971). "Zur Rückerschliessung der illyrischen Götterwelt und ihre Bedeutung für die südslawische Philologie". In Henrik Barić (ed.). Arhiv za Arbanasku starinu, jezik i etnologiju. Vol. I. R. Trofenik. pp. 27–33.
- Useini, Rini (2024). "Ethnology as a Vital Manifestation, (Folk Rites and Practices)". Philosophica. 11 (22–23). University of Tetova: 160–166. doi:10.62792/ut.philosophica.v11.i22-23.p2732. ISSN 2671-3020.
- Ushaku, Ruzhdi (1988). "Mbi strukturën leksiko-semantike dhe etimologjike të tipit të togfjalëshit të shqipes burri i dheut (Mundësia për një rindërtim)". Gjurmime Albanologjike. 17–18. Albanological Institute of Prishtina: 63–76.
- Watkins, Calvert (1995). How to Kill a Dragon: Aspects of Indo-European Poetics. London: Oxford University Press. ISBN 978-0-19-514413-0.
- West, Morris L. (2007). Indo-European Poetry and Myth. Oxford University Press. ISBN 978-0199280759.
- Wheeler, G. Post (1936). Albanian Wonder Tales. New York: The Junior Literary Guild and Doubleday, Doran and Company, Inc. pp. 247–280.
- Xhemaj, Ukë (1983). "Zjarri në besimet popullore shqiptare" [The Fire in Albanian Folk Beliefs]. In Mark Krasniqi, Ukë Xhemaj (ed.). Trashëgimia dhe tranformimi i kulturës popullore: materiala nga sesioni shkencor, mbajtur në Prishtinë më 7-8 shtator 1979. Albanological Institute of Prishtina. pp. 104–121.
