= Illyrian religion =

Religious beliefs of the Illyrian peoples

Illyrian religion refers to the religious beliefs and practices of the Illyrian peoples, a group of tribes who spoke the Illyrian languages and inhabited part of the western Balkan Peninsula from at least the 8th century BC until the 7th century AD. The available written sources are very tenuous. They consist largely of personal and place names, and a few glosses from Classical sources.

Still insufficiently studied, the most numerous traces of religious practices of the pre-Roman era are those relating to religious symbolism. Symbols are depicted in every variety of ornament and reveal that the chief object of the prehistoric cult of the Illyrians was the Sun, worshipped in a widespread and complex religious system. The Illyrian Sun-deity is figuratively represented on Iron Age plaques as the god of the sky and lightning, also associated with the fire altar where he throws lightning bolts. Illyrian deities were mentioned in inscriptions on statues, monuments, and coins of the Roman period, and some interpreted by Ancient writers through comparative religion. To these can be added a larger body of inscriptions from the south-eastern Italian region of Apulia written in the Messapic language, which is generally considered to be related to Illyrian. There appears to be no single most prominent god for all the Illyrian tribes, and a number of deities evidently appear only in specific regions.

As pagans, Illyrians believed in supernatural powers and they attributed to the deities qualities that were reflected in everyday life, health and disease, natural abundance and natural disaster. A number of Illyrian toponyms and anthroponyms derived from animal names and reflected the beliefs in animals as mythological ancestors and protectors. The serpent was one of the most important animal totems. Illyrians believed in the force of spells and the evil eye, in the magic power of protective and beneficial amulets which could avert the evil eye or the bad intentions of enemies. The rich spectrum in religious beliefs and burial rituals that emerged in Illyria, especially during the Roman period, may reflect the variation in cultural identities in this region.

Certain aspects of the deities and beliefs of the Illyrians stem ultimately from Proto-Indo-European mythology. Alongside the Thracian and Dacian beliefs, it constitutes part of Paleo-Balkan mythologies. Albanians preserved traces of Illyrian religious symbolism, and ancient Illyrian religion is one of the underlying sources from which Albanian paganism has drawn nourishment. One can also find several traces of Illyrian cults in the religious and superstitious beliefs among South Slavic peoples today.

== Cults ==
Cults from the Neolithic tradition—especially those that were associated with the fertility of the earth and with agriculture in general—continued to be practised throughout the Bronze Age and at the beginning of the Iron Age in the Western Balkans. Those traditions included the cult of the Earth Mother, the cult of the sun, and the cult of the serpent. During the early Iron Age, the Illyrian art was geometric and non-representational, with the combination of concentric circles, rhomboids, triangles and broken lines. It was a severe type of art devoid of fantasy, intended for farmers and cattle breeders or warriors. The absence of figured ornament may reflect an apparent lack of anthropomorphic cults during the early Iron Age. The geometric art of the period, which reached its climax in the 8th century BC, seems to be the only common feature between the different Illyrian areas, as artistic ornaments found after the 6th century BC rather show an outside influence, mainly from archaic Greece and Etruscan Italy.

Archaeological evidence demonstrate the existence of two main cults based upon two roughly defined geographic criteria: the cult of the serpent appears to have occurred principally in the southern regions of Illyria, while the waterfowl and solar symbols predominated in the north. The serpent as the symbol of fertility, protector of the hearth and a chthonic animal, could also be connected with the cult of the sun.

=== Sun ===
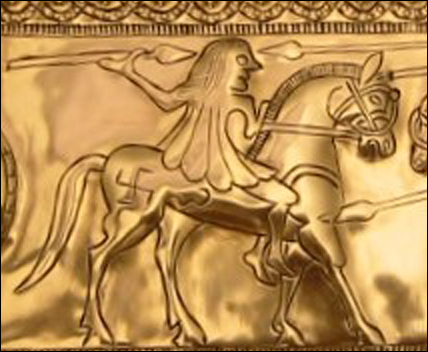
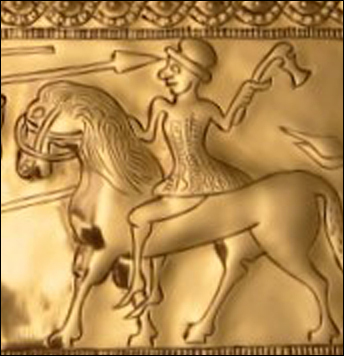
A swastika in clockwise motion on a detail of the reproduction of a 5th century BC bronze belt plaque from Vače, Slovenia

Many of the symbols found throughout Illyria were associated with the Sun, suggesting that the Sun worship was a cult common to Illyrian tribes. Early figurative evidence of the celestial cult in Illyria is provided by 6th century BCE plaques from Lake Shkodra, which belonged to the Illyrian tribal area of what was referred in historical sources to as the Labeatae in later times. Each of those plaques portray simultaneously sacred representations of the sky and the sun, and symbolism of lightning and fire, as well as the sacred tree and birds (eagles). In those plaques there is a mythological representation of the celestial deity: the Sun deity animated with a face and two wings, throwing lightning bolts into a fire altar, which in some plaques is held by two men (sometimes on two boats).

The solar deity was often depicted by Illyrians as an animal figure, the likes of the birds, serpents and horses, or represented geometrically as a spiral, a concentric circle or a swastika. The latter, moving clockwise (卍), portrayed the solar movement. Several bronze pendants widespread in the region have the shape of solar symbols such as a simple disk without rays, with four rays which form a cross, and with more rays. There are pendants that have more circles placed concentrically from the center to the periphery. Maximus of Tyre (2nd century AD) reported that the Paeonians worshipped the sun in the form of a small round disk fixed on the top of a pole. The sun-disk fixed on the top of a pole is also depicted in the coins of the Illyrian city of Damastion. Among the Liburnians and the Veneti, the sun-disk is depicted as a sun-boat borne across the firmament.

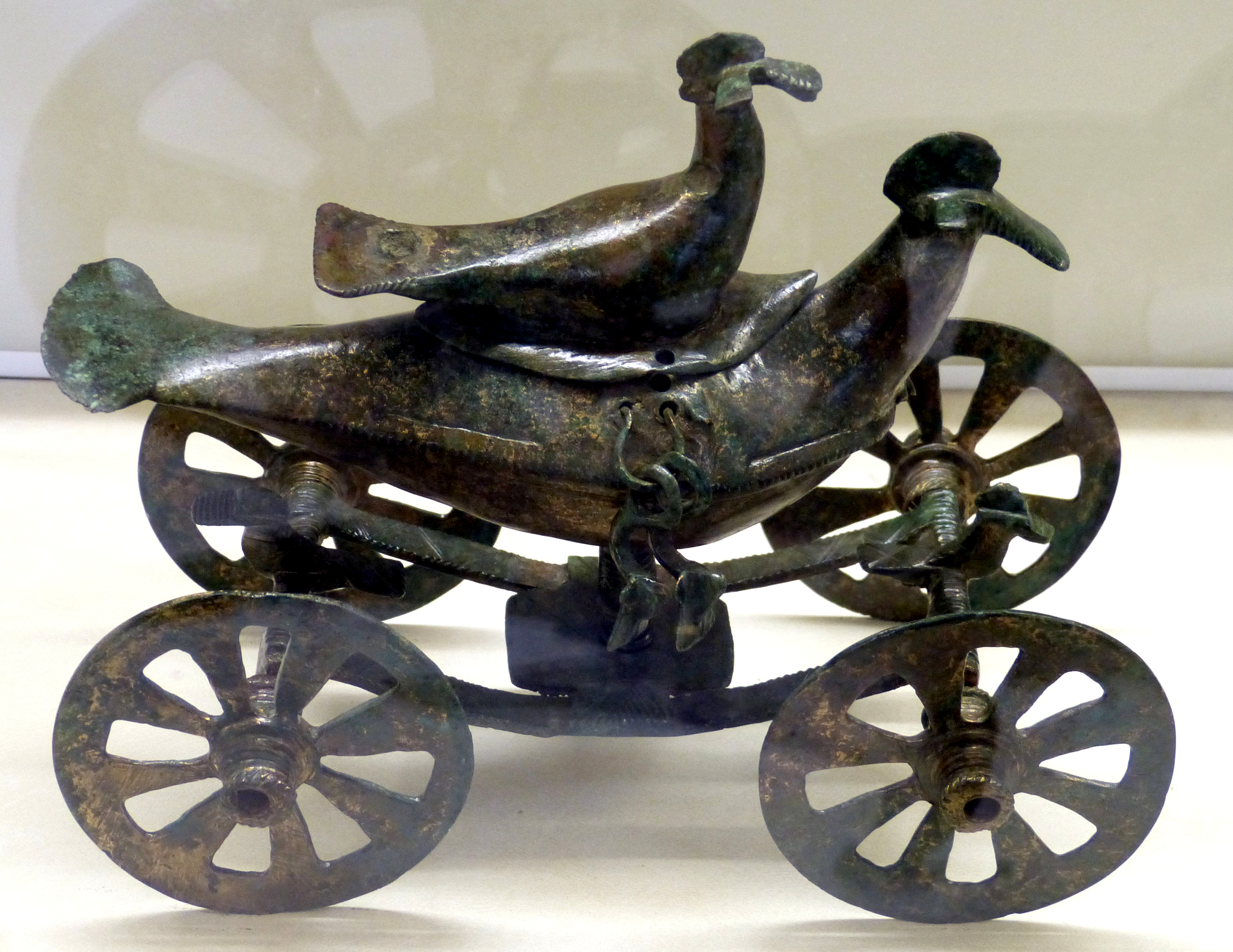
Representation of the most common Illyrian solar symbols: birds and circles with eight rays, on a 6th-century BC Glasinac bronze chariot; height 16.8 cm, length 20.4 cm

Waterfowl are among the most frequent solar symbols of the Illyrians, especially in the north. A great number of pendants with waterfowl shapes have been found in the Glasinac plateau, in the regions of the Japodes in Lika, in Liburnia and in the Illyrian regions of present-day Albania and North Macedonia. At Noricum were found two Illyrian temples with sacrificial altars associated with the sun-cult and erected on mountain peaks. Evidence of a widespread cult of the sun among Thracians suggests a common ancient Balkan religious practice. Archaeological findings have shown that Illyrians and Thracians practiced ritual sacrifices to the sun in round temples built in high places. Among Illyrians, the deer was an important sun symbol as it was considered a main sacrificial animal offered to the Sun.

Some of the geometric Illyrian cult symbols depicted on metal and ceramic ware.

Remnants of the cult of the sun have been preserved among the Albanians until the 20th century in agricultural and livestock cults, in craftsmanship, in calendar rituals, in the oral folk traditions and in art, and in some forms they still continue today (see Dielli). The solar deity was worshipped in the family life cycle, in the cult of hearth and fire, of water and the mountains; in oath swearing but also as a source of livelihood, of health and fertility, or simply as a useful protective object. A significant element of the sun-worship are the "fires of the year" (zjarret e vitit). Bonfires take place in Albania on the peaks of mountains, on hills and near homes, on Summer Day (beginning of March) or on June 24, sometimes in July, August or December 24. In the Kângë Kreshnikësh, different events are influenced by the sun. The "Mountains of the Sun" (Bjeshkët e Diellit) are the places where the heroes (Kreshnikët) operate. The sun symbols are found in Albania in many decorative ornaments, and until the 20th century, the cult of the sun was displayed on tattoos practiced among Albanians (Albanian traditional tattooing) and Catholics in Bosnia and Herzegovina.

=== Serpent ===
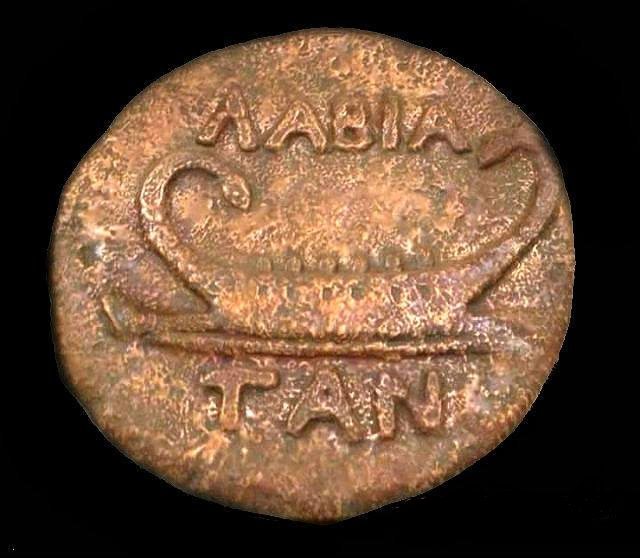
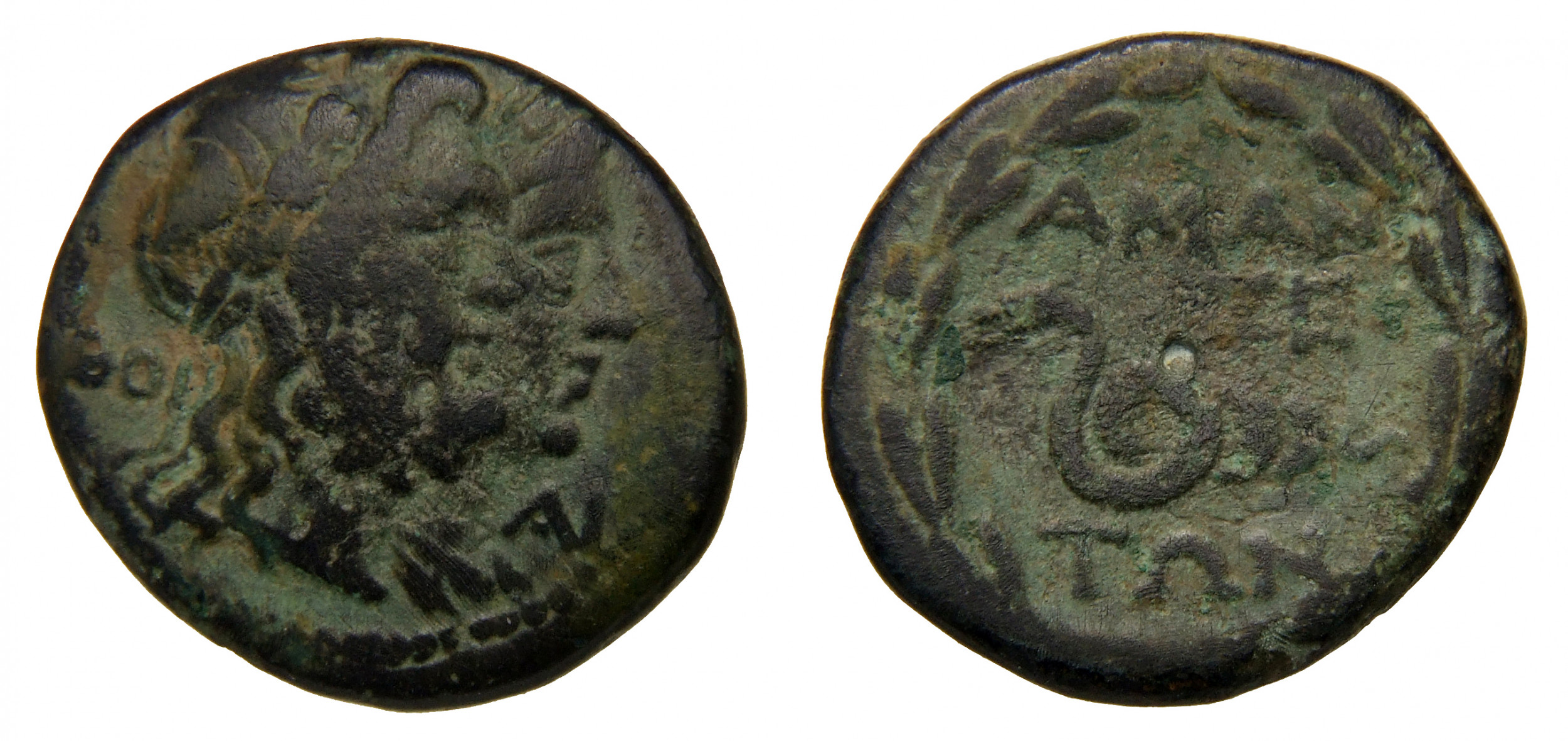
Illyrian lembs with figureheads of serpents depicted on Labeatan coins of the 2nd century BC; a serpent depicted on the reverse of an Amantian coin (c. 200 BC)

The serpent cult was widespread among Illyrians, especially in the south. The image of the serpent was a symbol of potency and fertility, and the protector of the domestic hearth. This mystic animal was connected with the cult of the ancestors and with the magical–religious complex of the fertility of the earth and of the woman. The Illyrian cult of the serpent is documented in ancient sources. An example is the mythological legend of Cadmus and his wife Harmonia, who, having come to the Illyrians and died in their homeland, continued to live after their death in the form of serpents. Their son Illyrios, the eponymous hero of the Illyrian lineage, also had the form of a serpent, and as such he can be considered as the supreme totem of the Illyrians.

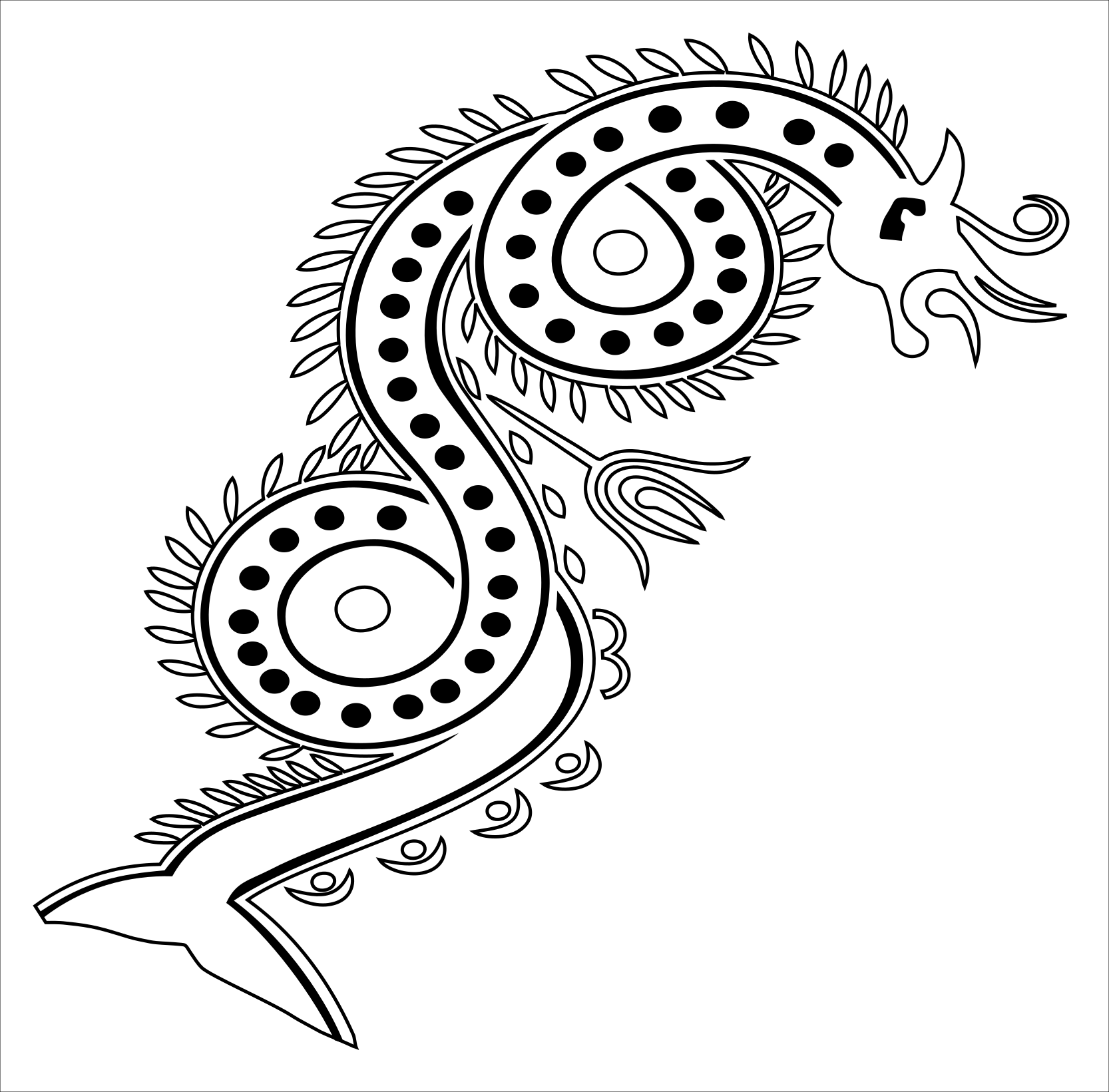
Oversized serpentine figure on the 3rd century BCE bronze Illyrian belt plate from Selcë e Poshtme.

The importance of the serpent in the symbolic and religious system of the Illyrians is reflected in numerous archaeological discoveries in their settlements and necropolises, especially in Albania, Bosnia and Herzegovina, North Macedonia and Serbia. The serpent was used as a common terminal ornament for decorative items. A 3rd century BC silvered bronze belt buckle found inside the Illyrian Tombs of Selça e Poshtme near the Lake Lychnidus shows a scene of warriors and horsemen in combat, with a giant serpent as a protector totem of one of the horsemen; a very similar belt was found also in the necropolis of Gostilj near the Lake Scutari. A Roman era statue of a local goddess of abundance was found in the locality of Qesarat; the goddess holds in her left hand a basket around which a snake is twisted. Figureheads of serpents appear on the ships depicted on Labeatan coins, which were found in the town of Çinamak, near Kukës. Other representations of the serpent are found in the Greek-Illyrian coins of Byllis, Apollonia, Dyrrhachion, Olympe and Amantia. In Dardania and Dalmatia there were dedicated altars to the serpentine pair Dracon and Dracaena/Dracontilla. In later times, the serpent was considered an obstacle to the Christian spiritual life.

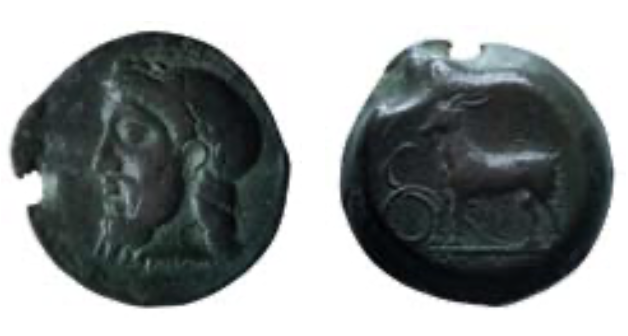
4th-century BCE coin from Pharos, symbolizing either Illyrian (snake)-Greek (goat) symbiosis or conflict between indigenous Illyrians and colonial Greeks.

The cult of the serpent has survived among Albanians throughout the Middle Ages and to the present days. All the beliefs, rites, and practices of magic associated with this cult have been well preserved in rural settlements by the elders until the last decades of the 20th century. The serpent is worshiped as a chthonic and water deity. It is also considered a healer and a totem protector of the family and the house. (Note: "In the ethnological tradition the totem of the Albanians and especially northern Albanians is the snake.".) In Albania, the serpent appears in many decorative symbols, in toponyms and anthroponyms. In southern Dalmatia in particular, the serpent is found in carving, heraldry and anthroponyms. The cult of the serpent left traces in numerous similar ritual manifestations within Slavic mythology. At Sutomore in Montenegro, on the former Encheleian coast, the blavor ("snake-lizard") is considered a household protector, and it is a sin to kill it, similarly in Albania. The word blavor is related to Albanian bullar and Romanian balaur, which are pre-Slavic Balkanisms that show the continuity of the cult of the serpent among the peoples of the region.

=== Horseman ===
The horsemen was a common Palaeo-Balkan hero. A 3rd-century BC silvered bronze belt buckle, found inside the Illyrian Tombs of Selça e Poshtme near the western shore of Lake Lychnidus in Dassaretan territory, depicts a scene of warriors and horsemen in combat, with a giant serpent as a protector totem of one of the horsemen; a very similar belt was found also in the necropolis of Gostilj near the Lake Scutari in the territory of the Labeatae, indicating a common hero-cult practice in those regions. Modern scholars suggest that the iconographic representation of the same mythological event includes the Illyrian cults of the serpent, of Cadmus, and of the horseman.

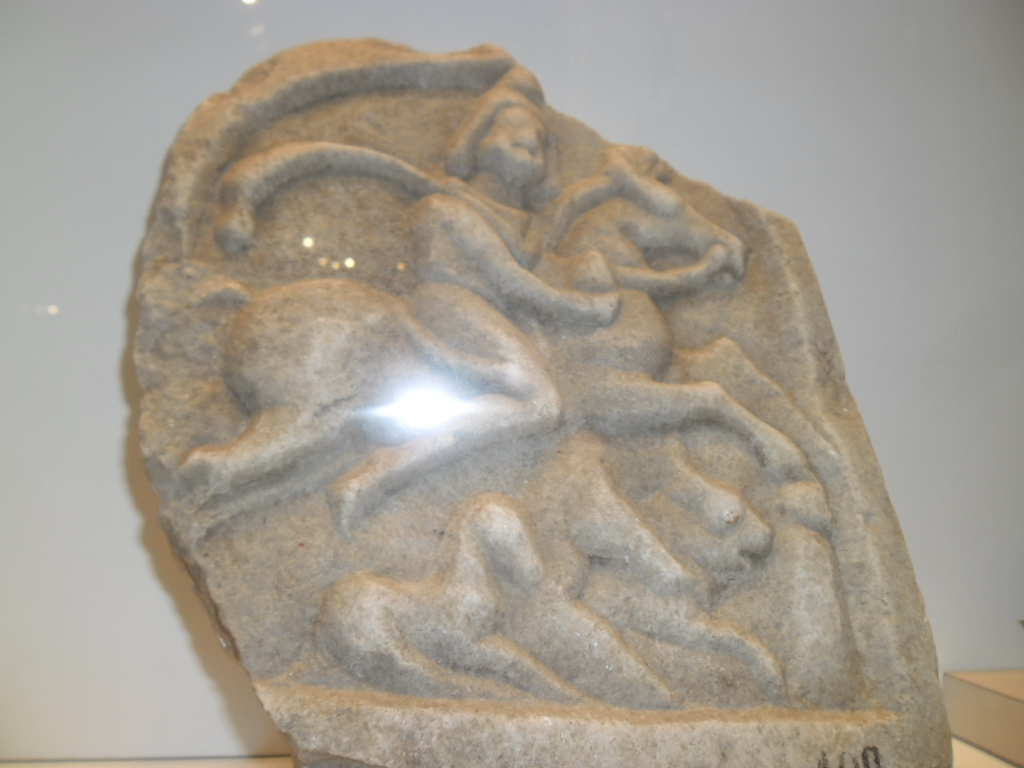
A marble relief of a riding horseman of the Roman period, Archaeological Museum in Zagreb, Croatia

The reliefs of the Thracian horseman spread from the eastern Balkans into Illyria during the Roman era, appearing in the typical image of a hunter on horseback, riding from left to right. The Thracian horseman was portrayed on both votive and funeral monuments. A less used type of monument depicting a Thracian horseman was the medallion, found also at Sarajevo, in Bosnia and Herzegovina.

== Deities by region ==
The study in the field of Illyrian religion is in several cases insufficient for a description even at the level of basic attributes of individual deities. The Illyrian Sun-deity, which was the chief cult object of the Illyrians, worshipped in a widespread and complex religious system, is figuratively represented on Iron Age plaques from Lake Shkodra as the god of the sky and lightning, also associated with the fire altar where he throws lightning bolts. The main source of information about the deities of the Illyrians are inscriptions from the Roman period; some deities are also named by Roman and Greek writers in equation with the classical pantheon which they were familiar with. Based on the available list of deities, there seems to be no single or prominent god shared by all the Illyrian tribes, and a number of deities evidently appear only in specific regions. On the other hand, some derivatives and epithets of gods were more widespread among the different tribes: a lot of Illyrian personal names are similar to the Dardanian deity Andinus, and certain Illyrian and Messapian goddesses (some of them borrowed from Greek) shared the title Ana or Anna, which is plausibly interpreted as "Mother".

The Illyrian names of the gods were not different in grammatical structures from the personal names reserved for humans. The onomastic evidence demonstrates a general division between several cultural provinces, which can sometimes overlap: the southern region of Illyria, the middle Pannonian and Dalmatian provinces, and the northwestern regions of Liburnia and Istria. Other Illyrian gods are more scarcely attested in Moesia Superior (present-day North Macedonia), and the pantheon may be extended to the Iapygian deities if one follows the generally accepted Illyro-Messapic theory that postulates an Illyrian migration towards southeastern Italy (present-day Apulia) during the early first millennium BC.

=== Pantheon ===
According to Naser Ferri, the Illyrians did not have a unified pantheon. Instead, certain gods were worshipped by one or more tribes within a specific territory. However, some scholars suggested that the Illyrians did have an organized pantheon of worshipped deities. Accordingly, different Illyrian tribes worshipped deities such as:

- Vidasus: The god of pastures, similar to the Roman god Silvanus.
- Thana: The goddess of the hunt, similar to the Roman goddess Diana.
- Bindo: The god of the sea and water, similar to the Roman Neptune.
- Anzotika and Iria: Goddesses associated with love and beauty, similar to the Roman Venus.
- Ika: A goddess who served as the protector of freshwater springs.
- Medaur: A deity interpreted as a god of medicine or a god of war.
- Armatus: A Latinized name attributed to a local god of war.
- Tadenus: The god of beauty, music, and healing, similar to the Greek Apollo.
- Parthinus: Proposed as the supreme tribal deity of the Parthini.

=== Illyris ===
The lexicographer Hesychius of Alexandria (fifth or sixth century AD) mentioned a god named Dei-pátrous, worshiped in Tymphaea as the Sky Father (*Dyēus-Ph_{2}tḗr) and a cognate of the Vedic Dyáuṣ Pitṛ́, Greek Zeus Patēr and Roman Jupiter. According to linguist Émile Benveniste, the region of Tymphaea was inhabited by an Illyrian population that may have influenced the Doric form copied by Hesychius as "Deipáturos" (Δειπάτυροϛ). The tribe of the Parthini worshiped Jupiter Parthinus as a chief deity, identified with the chief Roman god Jupiter. Hesychius recorded that the Illyrians believed in satyr-like creatures called Deuadai, which has been interpreted as a diminutive of the inherited Indo-European word for a "god" (*deywós). Philologist Hans Krahe argued that Satyros (Σάτυρος) may be of Illyrian origin.

The name Redon appears in inscriptions found in Santa Maria di Leuca (present-day Lecce), and on coins minted by the Illyrian city of Lissos, suggesting that he was worshipped as the guardian deity of the city, and probably as a sea god. The fact that Redon was always depicted on coins wearing a petasos demonstrates a connection with travelling and sailing, which led historians to the conclusion that Redon was the deity protector of travellers and sailors. Indeed, the inscriptions of Santa Maria di Leuca were carved by the crews of two Roman merchant ships manned by Illyrians. Inscriptions mentioning Redon were also found on coins from the Illyrian cities of Daorson and Scodra, and even in archaeological findings from Dyrrhachium after the establishment of a Roman colony there. His name keeps on being used in the Albanian Kepi i Rodonit ("Cape of Rodon"), a headland located near Durrës which could be analysed as an Illyrian sanctuary dedicated to the god of the sailors in the past.

Prende, widely worshiped by Albanians as the goddess of dawn, love, beauty, fertility, and women protection, is considered to have been an Illyrian love-goddess. The name Perëndi found in Albanian to refer to "god, deity, sky" is considered by some scholars as a cognate of the Proto-Indo-European weather god *Perk^{w}unos, deriving from the root *per- ("to strike"), and attached to the suffixes -en- and -di/dei, the Illyrian sky-god. (Note: The suffix -n- has reflexes in other Indo-European divine names like *peruh_{x}nos 'the one with the thunder stone', or Perun/Perunŭ, the Slavic thunder god. The suffix -di/dei derives from PIE *Dyēus.) This would make it a possible Illyrian thunder god. The fire was evidently deified as Enji, which has been interpreted as a cognate of the Vedic fire god Agni, descending from the root *H_{x}n̩g^{w}nis, the Proto-Indo-European divinised fire. Enji, Prende and probably Perëndi are considered to have been worshiped by Illyrians until the spread of Christianity in the region, after which Enji was demoted to demonic status, but his name survived in the Albanian language to refer to Thursday (enjte). Prende was similarly inherited as a root for Friday (premte) and Saint Venera (Shënepremte), while Perëndi was retained as the name of God.

An Illyrian god named Medaurus is mentioned in a dedication from Lambaesis (Numidia) made by a Roman legatus native of the Illyrian city of Risinium (present-day Montenegro). The name is more scarcely attested on another inscription found in Risinium, engraved by the Peripolarchoi, the border guards of the city; and also in Santa Maria di Leuca, where Medaurus is the divine name given to a merchant ship. Portrayed as riding on horseback and carrying a lance, Medaurus was the protector deity of Risinium, with a monumental equestrian statue dominating the city from the acropolis. He was also possibly regarded as a war god among Illyrian soldiers fighting in the Roman legions along the limes, especially during the Marcomannic Wars (166–180 AD).

=== Dalmatia and Pannonia ===
Dalmatia and Pannonia were ruled by the Roman Empire and grouped together within the province of Illyricum from the creation of the empire in 27 BC until the reign of Vespasian in 69–79 AD, during which they were separated into two different provinces. From the beginning of the reign of Septimius Severus in 193, Pannonians began to adopt Roman deities or put emphasis on local gods compatible with Roman cults. Sedatus, Epona, Mars Latobius, Jupiter Optimus Maximus Teutanus, and other non-Illyrian deities were thus introduced by Roman and Celtic foreigners in the region, and local religion is hardly traceable before the Severan period.

==== Cult of Silvanus ====
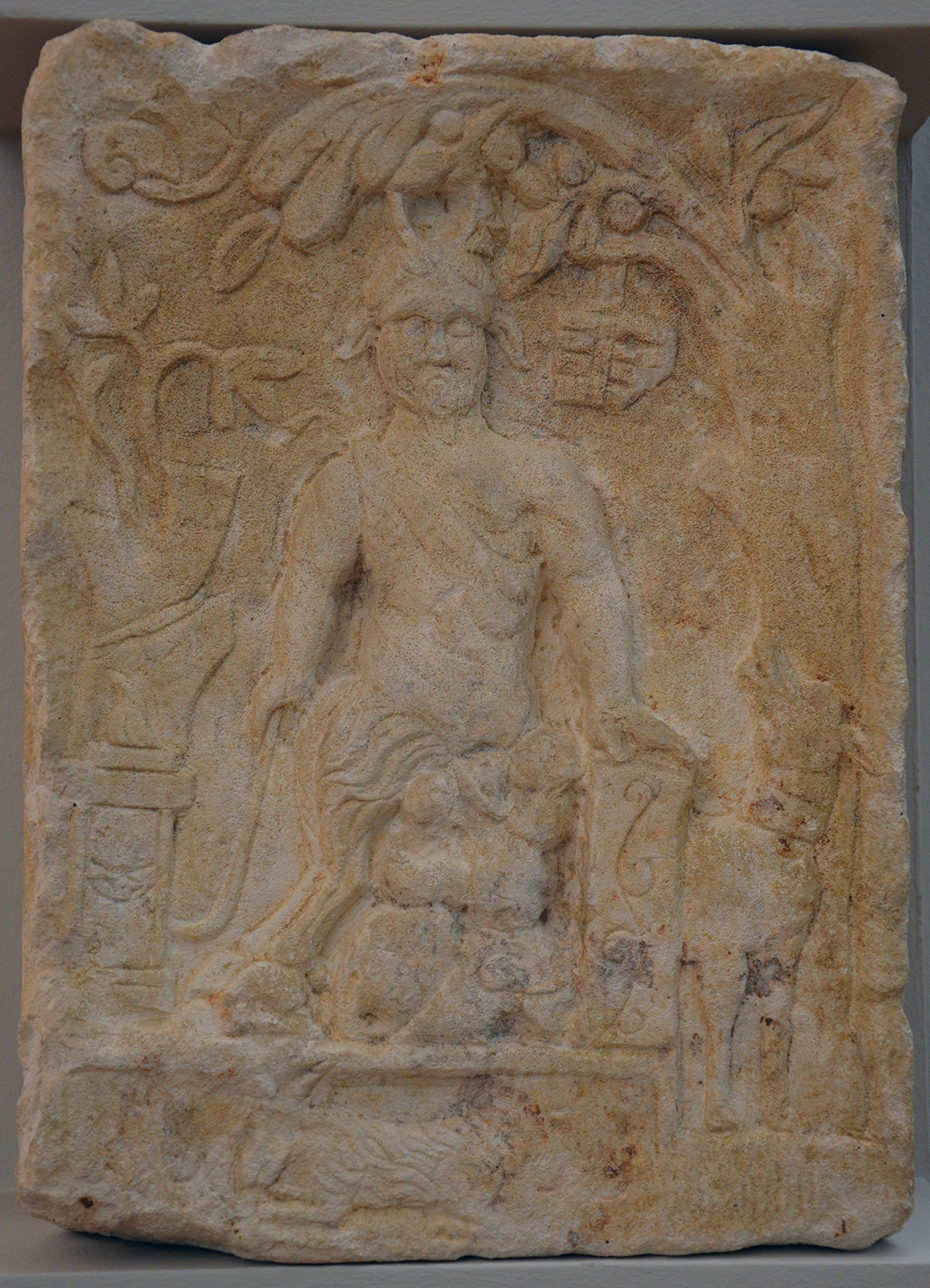
Votive relief of Silvanus with iconography of Pan; from Split, Croatia, c. 2nd–3rd century AD

The cult of Silvanus, the Roman tutelary deity of the wild, woods and fields, was one of the most popular ritual traditions in Dalmatia and Pannonia during the Roman period. Silvanus was so familiar in the region that his name was often abbreviated on inscriptions. The way he was portrayed in Dalmatia differed from the rest of the Roman Empire, with various elements common only with Pannonia. Silvanus was depicted with attributes generally related to Pan, such as goat legs, horns, syrinx, pedum, grapes or other fruits, and he was escorted by a goat and female companions (Diana and the Nymphs). Several cognomina were attributed to Silvanus in particular, such as Domesticus when he was portrayed as a bearded countryman with his watch-dog, holding the knife of a wine-grower or gardener. Under the name Silvanus Messor, he was the protector of the harvest, while the epithet Silvestris, often paired with Diana and the Nymphs, depicted the hunter and the rural woodland identity.

Some scholars have interpreted those peculiarities from the point of the view that Silvanus was an indigenous deity resembling Pan, but recognized by Classical writers as 'Silvanus' through the eyes of interpretatio romana. They generally link the representations of Silvanus with an erect phallus to pre-Roman fertility cults found earlier in the region, especially local ithyphallic depictions of the Iron Age. The cult of Silvanus was also more frequent in the towns of the Dalmatian heartlands such as Vrlika than in the coastal Graeco-Roman colonies like Narona. An opposing view regards the cult of Silvanus in Dalmatia and Pannonia as a tradition of Italian origin eventually adopted by Balkan populations living in Romanized areas during the second century AD. The association of Silvanus with the Phrygian deity Attis also appears in Dalmatia and further north in Aquileia (Italia).

The Silvanae, whose name is the feminine plural of Silvanus, were featured on many dedications across Pannonia. As most of them were found in the western Balkans rather than in Italy, they may have represented Illyrian nymphs. In the hot springs of Topusko (Pannonia Superior), sacrificial altars were dedicated to Thana and Vidasus, whose names invariably stand side by side as companions. Vidasus is identified with Silvanus, and his name may derive from the PIE root *wid^{h}u- ("tree, forest"), with a possible cognate in the Norse god Víðarr, who is said to live amid long grass and brushwood. Thana, compared with the Roman goddess Diana, was the deity of forestry and hunting. Scholars have argued that Thana survived as Zana of Albanian mythology, and that she can be traced today in the image of "mother Yana" within Serbian folklore.

==== Cult of Liber ====
In Dalmatia, the Roman deity of wine, fertility and freedom Liber was worshipped with the attributes of Silvanus and those of Terminus, the protector god of boundaries. His cult was more widespread in the Balkan provinces than in Italy, with prominent centres of cult in Salona and Narona. On the islands of Brattia and Corcyra Nigra, Liber was venerated under the epithet Torcle(n)sis as a god of the wine press. Certainly due to a mixing of local traditions under Hellenistic influence, he was often associated with Dionysus, the Greek god of wine, fertility and religious ecstasy. In Tragurium was erected a statue of Liber-Dionysus-Bacchus, and a relief from Omiš depicts him as an effeminate Dionysus wearing vine branches and holding a thyrsus. Another relief from Livno portrays him with a thyrsus and serpent, or with a vase and a dog, a possible syncretism with the Greek god of medicine Asclepius. A feminine version named Libera was also discovered in inscriptions from Hvar, Bihać, Zenica, Zemun and Humac.

==== Other deities ====
Tadenus was a Dalmatian deity bearing the identity or epithet of Apollo in inscriptions found near the source of the Bosna river. His identity is not known and the name may be of Thracian origin. A local ruler named Ionios appears on inscriptions carved on Dalmatian coins. His mythic dimensions have been highlighted by scholars, and it seems likely that he received his name from a mythical predecessor. The Delmatae also had Armatus as a war god in Delminium. Two altars were dedicated to him under the name Armatus Augustus in Dalmatia, and while he was recorded under a Latin name, the deity was likely of native origin.

Aecorna (or Arquornia) was a goddess worshipped exclusively in the Emona Basin, in the cities of Nauportus and Emona (Pannonia Superior), where she was the most important divinity next to Jupiter. The earlier testimony of her cult appears in inscriptions dated 50–30 BC, and she is most likely of native origin. Aecorna has been interpreted as a lake goddess, or as a patroness of the river traffic along the Ljubljanica. Laburus was also a local deity worshipped in Emona. His name was found on an altar erected at Fužine, in a dangerous site for navigation near the rapids of the Ljubljanica river. Laburus may thus have been a deity protecting the boatmen sailing through those perilous rapids. Oriental Mithraic mysteries became also widespread in Pannonia during the Roman period, with an important centre of cult in Poetovio.

=== Liburnia and Istria ===
Iutossica and Anzotica, the latter identified with Venus, were worshipped in Liburnia. Some deities are known exclusively from Istria, such as Nebres, Malesocus, Iria, or Boria, a mountain-god (from Illyrian *bora, "mountain"). Other local theonyms include Latra, Sentona, and the nymph Ica. In honour of Ica was erected a monument in the vicinity of a spring in Flanona, which still bears her name. Bindus, identified with Neptune, was worshiped among the Japodes as the guardian deity of springs and seas. Altars were dedicated to him by tribal leaders at the Privilica spring sources near Bihać. By the early 1st century AD, the Istrian goddess Heia was worshipped on the Pag Island in a syncretism with the Roman goddess Bona Dea. She is also attested in the towns of Nesactium and Pula.

=== Moesia Superior ===
The region of Moesia Superior showed a great variety of cultural beliefs, as it lay on the cultural frontier between the Latin West and the Greek East. The debated identity of tribes such as the Dardanians, interpreted as either Illyrian or Thracian, or the Paeonians, likewise dwelling between the Dardanians and Macedonians, rests upon the fact that they inhabited an Illyrian-Thracian contact zone where both cultures intertwined over a long period.

The Dardanian deity Andinus was worshipped in a region dominated by Thracian gods. The only trace left is a name carved on an altar dedicated by a beneficiarus ("a foreigner"). Variants like Andia or Andio were also common among the Dardanians, and a lot of Illyrian personal names are found under the forms Andes, Andueia or Andena. The Paeonians worshiped a god named Dualos, the equivalent of Dionysus. His name has been compared with Albanian dej ("drunk") and Gothic dwals ("a madman"), reinforcing the association of the Paeonian deity with wine and intoxication.

=== Apulia ===
Iapygian tribes (the Messapians, Daunians and Peucetians) all shared Messapic as a common language until the Roman conquest of Apulia from the late 4th century BC onwards. Messapic was probably related to the Illyrian languages spoken on the other side of the Adriatic Sea, as both ancient sources and modern scholars have described an Illyrian migration into Italy early in the first millennium BC. The pre-Roman religion of Iapygians appears as a substrate of indigenous elements mixed with Greek mythology. In fact, the Roman conquest probably accelerated the hellenisation of a region already influenced by contacts with Magna Grecia, a set of colonies Greeks had founded in southeastern Italy by the 8th century BC (Tarentum in particular), after first incursions centuries earlier during the Mycenaean period. Aphrodite and Athena were thus worshiped in Apulia as Aprodita and Athana, respectively.

Indigenous Iapygian beliefs featured the curative powers of the waters at the herõon of the god Podalirius and the fulfilling of oracles for anyone who slept wrapped in the skin of a sacrificed ewe. Menzanas was a local Messapian deity whose name literally translates as "Lord of Horses". He was often worshipped under the epithet Juppiter Menzanas, and horses were sacrificed to him by being thrown alive into a fire. Originally formed as *mendyo-no-, the name Menzanas derives from the root *mendyo- ("foal"), (Note: Closely related to Albanian mëz, mënd; ultimately from PIE *mend-/mond- (perhaps *mn̥d-), "to suckle, feed, breast".) attached to the PIE suffix -nos ("controller of, lord of"). The cult of Juppiter Menzanas, known at least since Verrius Flaccus (c. 55 BC–20 AD), is probably a native custom eventually influenced by neighbouring Italic peoples. In fact, the native sky-god of the Messapians, Zis (or Dis), was likewise worshipped under the aspect of Zis Menzanas. Attested by the early 6th century BC, Zis is not a loanword adapted from the Greek Zeus, but a parallel inheritance from the Proto-Indo-European sky-god *Dyēus (via an intermediate form *dyēs), and other cognates appear in Albanian Zojz, Vedic Dyáuṣ, Latin Jovis (*Djous) and Illyrian Dei(-pátrous). The Tarentine god Dís (Δίς) has probably been borrowed from their neighbouring Messapians.

The goddess Venas (< *wenos), also an inherited deity (cognate with Latin Venus or Old Indic vánas "desire"), is often invoked along with the sky-god Zis (kla(o)hi Zis Venas, "listen, Zis (and) Venas") and with an unknown god, Taotor (Θautour), probably related to the "tribe" or the "community" as his name stems from PIE *teutéh_{a}- ('people'). Lahona was the name of a Messapian deity worshipped as an epithet attached to Aphrodite: ana aprodita lahona. She was featured in votive inscriptions found in Ceglie Messapica, and the dedication has been translated either as "To the goddess Aphrodite Lahona", or as "Mother Aphrodite Lahona". The theonym Thana, attested on Messapian inscriptions, is also found on Dalmatian altars.

The goddess Damatura (or Damatira) could be of Messapian origin rather than a borrowing from the Greek Demeter, with a form dā- ("earth", compare with Albanian: dhe) attached to -matura ("mother") and akin to the Illyrian god Dei-pátrous (dei-, "sky", attached to -pátrous, "father"). This theory was supported by Pisani (1935) and Georgiev (1937), rejected by Kretschmer (1939), and more recently supported by Çabej, Demiraj (1997), and West (2007), although Beekes (2009) and De Simone (2017) rather see a borrowing from Greek. West further notes that "the formal parallelism between [Damatura and Deipaturos] may favour their having been a pair, but evidence of the liaison is lacking."

== Sanctuaries ==
=== Perpetual fire ===
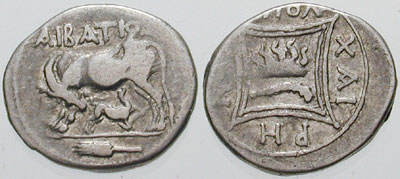
A 3rd century BCE coin from Apollonia depicting the perpetual fire of the nymphaion.

The perpetual fire at Nymphaion sanctuary was a place of worship in southern Illyria that was renowned throughout classical antiquity for its unique natural features. Placed around the lower Vjosë/Aoos river near ancient Apollonia, Byllis, and present-day Selenica, in Albania, the area was occupied by Illyrians since before archaic colonial times, and the site was likely already a place of worship because of its peculiar physical properties. According to ancient literary accounts the fire of the sanctuary never went out before an ancient war fought between Apollonia and the Illyrians. It probably passed to Apollonia at the time of the Apollonian victory towards Thronium (5th century B.C). Inscriptions from Apollonia and Byllis mention the sanctuary, and coins from the same towns depict the eternal fire, as well as nymphs surrounding it.

In his description of the site Strabo (1st century BCE – 1st century CE) reports that a fire arises from a stone, and underneath it exists a source of warm water and asphalt. Pliny the Elder (1st century CE), in his description based on the accounts of historian Theopompus (4th century BCE), reports that even if the fire is located in the middle of a thick forest, it is very pleasant because it does not damage the greenery that surrounds it and the always lit crater of the nymphaion is located near a source of cold water. Pliny reports a public form of divination according to which the welfare of the Apolloniates was connected to the steadiness of the fire spring. He also gives the geographical position of the fire sanctuary: on the border of Apollonia, where the barbarians Amantini and Bylliones lived. Cassius Dio (2nd–3rd centuries CE) reports a description of the fire sanctuary including the practices related to the oracle provided by the great fire, giving a more detailed explanation of a private form of divination. Dio also expressed in other accounts his wonder at the greenness and moistness of the site in spite of the presence of its fire.

The fire sanctuary was associated with the cult of the nymphs. A relief found near Byllis shows the nymphs and a cloth wrapped around the fire of the nymphaion. A similar scene is also represented on a 1st-century BCE silver coin of Apollonia that depicts three nymphs dancing around the fire of the nymphaion. Of very ancient origin, the indigenous Illyrian cult of the nymphs influenced Apollonia. The continuation of the cult of the nymphs in the Roman imperial period in Apollonia is testified in a 2nd-century CE Greek inscription reporting Illyrian names. In addition to the natural home of the nymphs, the site was also considered a beautiful, lush spot attractive to satyrs.

== Mythology ==
=== Cosmology ===
The opinion according to which the Illyrians apparently did not develop a uniform cosmology on which to center their religious practices is incompatible with the discovery of a monument representing a round labyrinth that was dedicated to the "Dardanian Goddess" from Smira. This monument provides evidence for cosmogonic and cosmologic knowledges among the Dardani. The labyrinth was realized based on the concept of the trinity. There is used a numerological and geometric approach through a multidimensional holographic field, which illustrates the Dardanian perception of the cosmic order and the interconnection between the material world and the higher realm.

=== Legends ===
The absence of figured ornament during the early Iron Age may reflect an apparent lack of mythology among Illyrians in this period. The most deeply rooted mythological tradition among the populations of northwestern Balkans was the legend of Cadmus and Harmonia; other legends were those of Bato and of the Cadmeians. The myth of the heroic pair Cadmus and Harmonia was strictly connected to the Enchelei and the territory they inhabited: Boeotia and Illyria.

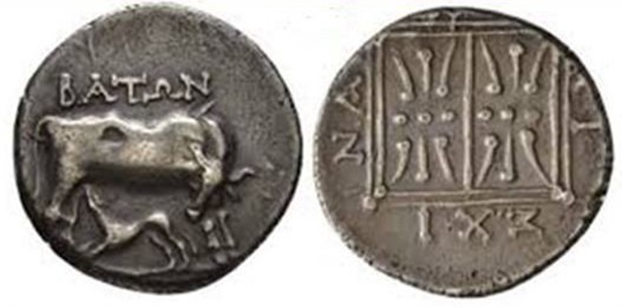
Coin from Apollonia bearing the inscription ΒΑΤΩΝ. The name Bato/Baton was very common among Illyrians, often related to legends, religion, and cults.

In Roman times Bato was one of the most notable Illyrian names, which perhaps was originally a nomen sacrum, and is outstandingly spread but condensed in Illyria, Thebes and Troas, with the presence of a temple dedicated to him at Argos, as recorded by Pausanias. In every region it is related to legends and religion, suggesting also an ancient cult. According to a legendary account reported by Polybius, cited by Stephanus of Byzantium, after Amphiaraus' disappearance his carioteer Baton settled in Illyria, near the country of the Enchelei.

The meanings of compound personal names like Veskleves (lit. "good-fame", i.e. "possessing good fame") have been interpreted as an indicator of an oral epic tradition among the Illyrians.

According to a tradition reported by Appian, the Illyrian king Epidamnos was the eponymous founder of the homonym city. His grandson Dyrrhachos, son of Epidamnos' daughter Melissa and Poseidon, founded a harbor that was called Dyrrhachion. According to this legend, when Dyrrhachus was attacked by his own brothers, the hero Heracles, who was promised part of the Illyrian land, came to his aid, but in the fight the hero killed by mistake Ionius, the son of his ally Dyrrhachos. During the funeral Heracles cast the body into the sea, thereafter named Ionian Sea. The genealogy of the foundation of Dyrrhachium includes among the founders Illyrian men (the Illyrian king Epidamnos and his grandson Dyrrachos), Greek men (the Corinthian Falio, descendant of Heracles), heroes (Heracles who was given part of the lands) and gods (Poseidon, as father of Dyrrachos). The emergence of a mixed tradition with apparently divergent aspects (Heracles as a "god" and a Greek king on the one hand, Epidamnos and his grandson Dyrrachos as Illyrians on the other hand) was probably determined by the perception of a profane action carried out by the colonists, which only a new heroic and divine tradition could have justified. Considering the Hellenization process to which the Illyrian local aristocracies adhered early, this tradition can be conceivably considered as constructed both by the colonists and by the Hellenized Taulantian population.

It has been argued that the legend of Aeneas was transmitted in Italy and Rome through Illyrian intermediacy. Similarly it can also explain the unclear Latin form Ulixes of the name Odysseus.

=== Totemism ===
Illyrian totemism is known almost exclusively from Illyrian tribal names, toponyms and anthroponyms, which were taken from the animal and plant world, reflecting a close relation of Illyrian peoples to nature. Such cases include: Enchelei, "people of the eel" (cf. Albanian: ngjalë, Ancient Greek: ἔγχελυς, Latin: anguilla); Taulanti, "people of the swallow" (cf. Albanian: tallandyshe, also reflected in the Greek translation χελῑδόν, khelīdṓn); Delmatai, "people of the sheep" (cf. Albanian: delmë); Dardani, "people of the pear" (cf. Albanian: dardhë); Peuketi, "people of the pine" (cf. Ancient Greek: πεύχη, peúkē, from PIE: *pewḱ-); Ulkinium, "city of the wolf" (cf. Albanian: ulk, from PIE: *wĺ̥k^{w}os); Delminium, "city of the sheep" (the same root of Delmatai). Many tribes believed in the protection of certain animals and plants, feeling also an ancestry link with them. Totemism may translate the ancient social relationships and religious conceptions held by Illyrians and their predecessors, a set of traditions that was still alive during the Roman period.

== Magic and superstition ==
As recorded by ancient Roman writers, Illyrians believed in the force of spells and the evil eye. Many examples of objects with the shape of phallus, hand, leg, and animal teeth are indicators of a belief in the protective and beneficial force of amulets.

== Burial and afterlife ==
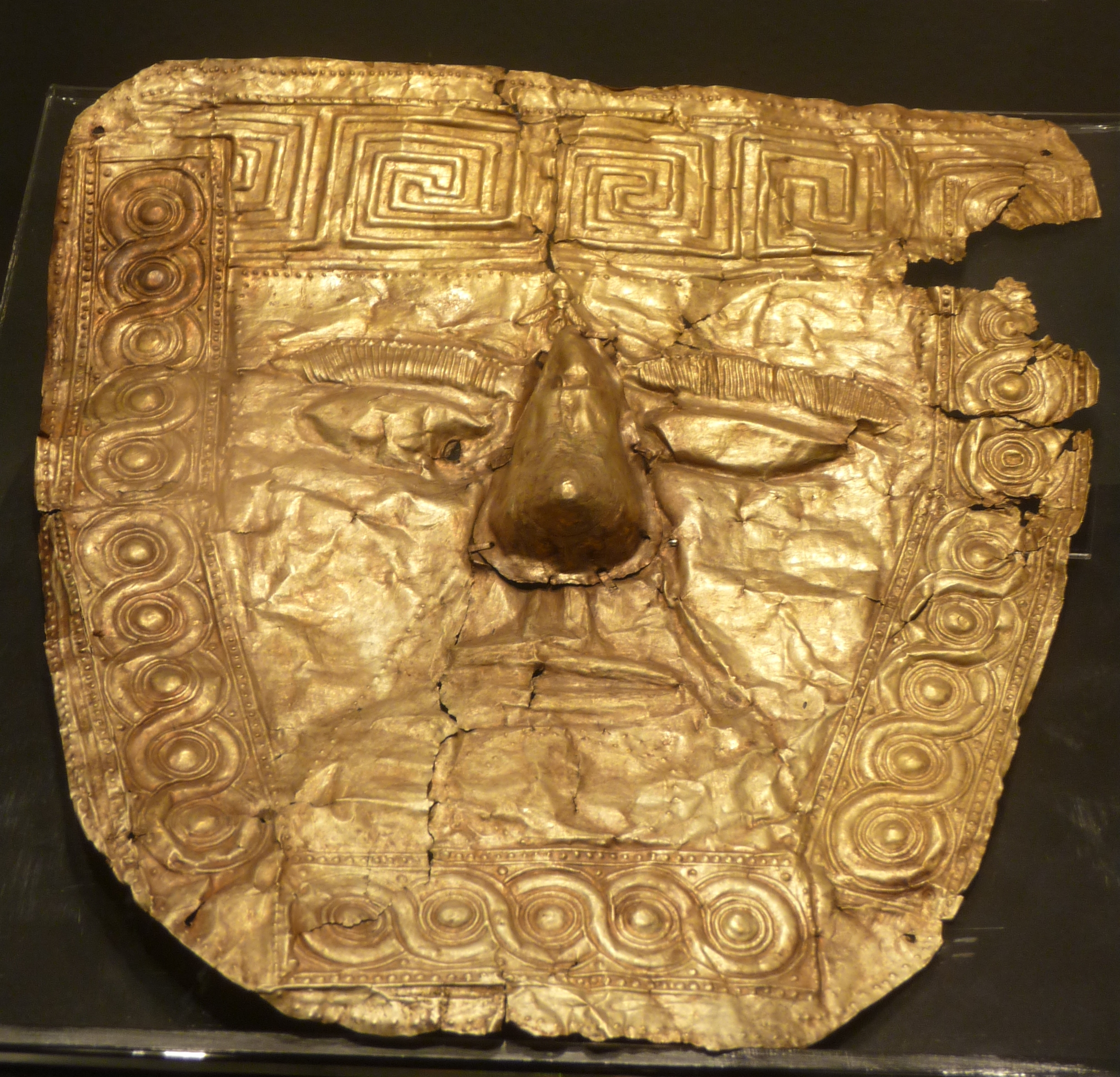
Gold funeral mask discovered in Trebeništa, 6th century BCE.

During the Bronze Age both flat graves and tumuli were built. The tumulus-burial is considered to have been imported from the first Indo-European wave that spread throughout the Balkans towards the beginning of the Bronze Age. This form of burial practice, once it appeared, especially in central and southern Illyria, continued without interruption throughout the Late Bronze Age and the Early Iron Age, becoming in this period a specific component of the Illyrian ethnic tradition. During the Bronze Age until the beginning of the Iron Age, the most common funerary practice was to lay out the body in a contracted position, a tradition continued from Neolithic times. The custom of burial in tumuli in the contracted position, which appeared also in southern Italy, especially in Apulia, suggest a movement of Illyrian peoples from the eastern Adriatic shore at the beginning of the first millennium BC. Cremation, on the other hand, was very rare, however it was not discontinuous by the Middle Bronze Age.

In the Iron Age, during the late 6th and early 5th century BC, the increase in cremation graves in the Glasinac culture has been interpreted as a possible collapse of the tribal structure which led to changes in the prevailing religious belief. The shift from inhumation to cremation is thought to be an evidence of the arrival of new people from the north. In fact, cremation became a more common rite among northern Illyrians, while inhumation persisted as the dominant rite in the south. The gradual transition from the rite of cremation to that of inhumation during the Roman period can be interpreted as a sign of greater concern for the afterlife. The rich spectrum in religious beliefs and burial rituals that emerged in Illyria, especially during the Roman period, is an indicator of the variation in cultural identities in this region.

== See also ==
- Albanian paganism
- Ancient Greek religion
- Paleo-Balkan mythology
- Proto-Indo-European mythology
- Religion in ancient Rome
- Slavic paganism
- Thracian religion

== Bibliography ==
- Anamali, Skënder (1992). "Santuari di Apollonia". In Stazio, Attilio; Ceccoli, Stefania (eds.). La Magna Grecia e i grandi santuari della madrepatria: atti del trentunesimo Convegno di studi sulla Magna Grecia. Atti del Convegno di studi sulla Magna Grecia (in Italian). Vol. 31. Istituto per la storia e l'archeologia della Magna Grecia. pp. 127–136.
- Beekes, Robert S. P. (2009). Beek, Lucien van (ed.). Etymological Dictionary of Greek. Brill. ISBN 978-90-04-32186-1.
- Benveniste, Émile (1969). Dictionary of Indo-European Concepts and Society (2016 ed.). Hau Books (University of Chicago Press). ISBN 978-0-9861325-9-9.
- Boardman, John; Sollberger, E. (1982). J. Boardman; I. E. S. Edwards; N. G. L. Hammond; E. Sollberger (eds.). The Cambridge Ancient History: The Prehistory of the Balkans; and the Middle East and the Aegean world, tenth to eighth centuries B.C. Vol. III (part 1) (2 ed.). Cambridge University Press. ISBN 0521224969.
- Brahaj, Jaho (2007). Flamuri i Kombit Shqiptar: origjina, lashtësia. Enti Botues "Gjergj Fishta". ISBN 9789994338849.
- Brandt, J. Rasmus; Ingvaldsen, HÎkon; Prusac, Marina (2014). Death and Changing Rituals: Function and meaning in ancient funerary practices. Oxbow Books. ISBN 978-1-78297-639-4.
- Cabanes, Pierre (2008). "Greek Colonisation in the Adriatic". In Tsetskhladze Gocha R. (ed.). Greek Colonisation: An Account of Greek Colonies and Other Settlements Overseas. Brill. ISBN 978-90-04-15576-3.
- Cambi, Nenad; Čače, Slobodan; Kirigin, Branko, eds. (2002). Greek influence along the East Adriatic Coast. Split (Državni Hidrografski Institut): Kniževni Krug. ISBN 978-953-163-154-9.
- Castiglioni, Maria Paola (2010). Cadmos-serpent en Illyrie: itinéraire d'un héros civilisateur. Edizioni Plus. ISBN 9788884927422.
- Ceka, Neritan (2013). The Illyrians to the Albanians. Tirana: Migjeni. ISBN 9789928407467.
- Ceka, Neritan (1992). "Santuari dell'area illirico-epirotica". In Stazio, Attilio; Ceccoli, Stefania (eds.). La Magna Grecia e i grandi santuari della madrepatria: atti del trentunesimo Convegno di studi sulla Magna Grecia. Atti del Convegno di studi sulla Magna Grecia (in Italian). Vol. 31. Istituto per la storia e l'archeologia della Magna Grecia. pp. 123–126.
- Delplace, Christiane (2019). "Cultes féminins dans l'Adriatique romaine : autour de Bona Dea". In Christiane, Delplace; Tassaux, Francis (eds.). Les cultes polythéistes dans l'Adriatique romaine (in French). Ausonius Éditions. ISBN 978-2-35613-260-4.
- De Simone, Carlo (1989). "Gli Studi Recenti sulla Lingua Messapica". In Ampolo, Carmine (ed.). Italia Omnium Terrarum Parens (in Italian). Libri Scheiwiller. ISBN 978-8876441325.
- De Simone, Carlo (2017). "Messapic". In Klein, Jared; Joseph, Brian; Fritz, Matthias (eds.). Handbook of Comparative and Historical Indo-European Linguistics. Vol. 3. Walter de Gruyter. ISBN 978-3-11-054243-1.
- de Vaan, Michiel (2008). Etymological Dictionary of Latin and the other Italic Languages. Brill. ISBN 9789004167971.
- Dorcey, Peter F. (1992). The Cult of Silvanus: A Study in Roman Folk Religion. Brill. ISBN 9004096019.
- Durham, Edith (2004). Bejtullah D. Destani (ed.). Albania and the Albanians: Selected Articles and Letters, 1903–1944. I.B.Tauris. ISBN 1850439397.
- Dyczek, Piotr; Kolendo, Jerzy; Łajtar, Adam; Plóciennik, Tomasz; Rzepkowski, Krzysztof (2014). "Une inscription métrique de Lambaesis (CIL, VIII, 2581; F. Buecheler, Carmina Latina epigraphica, 1527) et la statue du dieu illyrien Médaure". Antiquités Africaines (in French). 50 (1): 73–84. doi:10.3406/antaf.2014.1560.
- Dzino, Danijel (2017). "The Cult of Silvanus in the Central Adriatic Islands". In Anna Kouremenos (ed.). Insularity and identity in the Roman Mediterranean. Oxbow Books. ISBN 978-1785705830.
- Elsie, Robert (2001). A Dictionary of Albanian Religion, Mythology and Folk Culture. London: Hurst & Company. ISBN 1-85065-570-7.
- Garašanin, Milutin V. (1976). "O problemu starobalkanskog konjanika" [About the Problem of Old Balkan Horseman]. Godišnjak Centra za balkanološka ispitivanja (in Serbo-Croatian). 13. Akademija Nauka i Umjetnosti Bosne i Hercegovine: 273–283.
- Gruen, Erich S. (2005). Cultural borrowings and ethnic appropriations in antiquity. F. Steiner. ISBN 978-3-515-08735-3.
- Hampartumian, Nubar (1979). Corpus Cultus Equitis Thracii (CCET). Vol. 4 Moesia Inferior (Romanian Section) and Dacia. Brill. ISBN 9004295526.
- Katičić, Radoslav (1977). "Enhelejci (Die Encheleer)" [The Encheleans]. Godišnjak Centra za balkanološka ispitivanja (15): 5–82.
- Krahe, Hans (1946). "Die illyrische Naniengebung (Die Götternamen)" (PDF). Jarhbücher f. d. Altertumswiss (in German). pp. 199–204. S2CID 54995190. Archived (PDF) from the original on 2019-03-07.
- Lamboley, Jean-Luc (2019). "Les cultes de l'Adriatique méridionale à l'époque républicaine". In Christiane, Delplace; Tassaux, Francis (eds.). Les cultes polythéistes dans l'Adriatique romaine (in French). Ausonius Éditions. ISBN 978-2-35613-260-4.
- Larson, Jennifer Lynn (2001). Greek Nymphs: Myth, Cult, Lore. New York: Oxford University Press. ISBN 978-0-19-514465-9.
- Leeming, David (2005). The Oxford Companion to World Mythology. Oxford University Press. ISBN 0195156692.
- Lurker, Manfred (2005). The Routledge Dictionary of Gods and Goddesses, Devils and Demons. Routledge, Taylor & Francis. ISBN 0-203-64351-8.
- Mallory, James P.; Adams, Douglas Q. (1997). Encyclopedia of Indo-European Culture. London: Routledge. ISBN 978-1-884964-98-5.
- Mallory, James P.; Adams, Douglas Q. (2006), The Oxford Introduction to Proto-Indo-European and the Proto-Indo-European World, Oxford, England: Oxford University Press, ISBN 978-0-19-929668-2
- Marchesini, Simona (2009). Le lingue frammentarie dell'Italia antica: manuale per lo studio delle lingue preromane (in Italian). U. Hoepli. ISBN 978-88-203-4166-4.
- Matijašič, Robert; Tassaux, Francis (2019). "Liber et Silvanus". In Christiane, Delplace; Tassaux, Francis (eds.). Les cultes polythéistes dans l'Adriatique romaine (in French). Ausonius Éditions. ISBN 978-2-35613-260-4.
- Mócsy, András (1974). Pannonia and Upper Moesia: A History of the Middle Danube Provinces of the Roman Empire. Routledge. ISBN 978-1-317-75424-4.
- Orel, Vladimir E. (1998). Albanian Etymological Dictionary. Brill. ISBN 978-90-04-11024-3.
- Pallottino, Massimo (1992). "The Beliefs and Rites of the Apulians, an Indigenous People of Southeastern Italy". In Bonnefoy, Yves (ed.). Roman and European Mythologies. University of Chicago Press. ISBN 978-0-226-06455-0.
- Pajón Leyra, Irene (2023). "Islands and their marvels as structural principle in the so-called historiographical section of the De mirabilibus auscultationibus". In Stefan Schorn, Robert Mayhew (ed.). Historiography and Mythography in the Aristotelian Mirabilia. Rutgers University Studies in Classical Humanities. Taylor & Francis. pp. 10–31. doi:10.4324/9781003437819-2. ISBN 9781000986105.
- Palmer, Leonard Robert (1988). The Latin Language. University of Oklahoma Press. ISBN 0-8061-2136-X.
- Pisani, Vittore (1987). Linguistica e filologia: atti del VII Convegno internazionale di linguisti tenuto a Milano nei giorni 12-14 settembre 1984. Paideia. ISBN 8839403922.
- Pokorny, Julius (1959). George Starostin; A. Lubotsky (eds.). "Indo-European Etymological Dictionary". Technische Universiteit Eindhoven.
- Šašel Kos, Marjeta (1993). "Cadmus and Harmonia in Illyria". Arheološki Vestnik. 44: 113–136.
- Šašel Kos, Marjeta (2019). "Sacred Places and Epichoric Gods in the Southern Alpine Area". In Christiane, Delplace; Tassaux, Francis (eds.). Les cultes polythéistes dans l'Adriatique romaine. Ausonius Éditions. ISBN 978-2-35613-260-4.
- Sassi, Barbara (2018). "Sulle faglie il mito fondativo: i terremoti a Durrës (Durazzo, Albania) dall'Antichità al Medioevo" (PDF). In Cavalieri, Marco; Boschetti, Cristina (eds.). Multa per aequora. Il polisemico significato della moderna ricerca archeologica. Omaggio a Sara Santoro. Fervet Opus 4, Vol. 2, part VII: Archeologia dei Balcani (in Italian). Presses Universitaires de Louvain, with the support of Centre d'étude des Mondes antiques (CEMA) of the Université catholique de Louvain. ISBN 978-2-87558-692-6.
- Shukriu, Edi (2008). "Prehistory and Antique History of Kosova" (PDF). Thesis Kosova. 1. Archived from the original (PDF) on 13 October 2022.
- Small, Alastair (2014). "Pots, Peoples and Places in Fourth-Century B.C.E. Apulia". In Carpenter, T. H.; Lynch, K. M.; Robinson, E. G. D. (eds.). The Italic People of Ancient Apulia: New Evidence from Pottery for Workshops, Markets, and Customs. Cambridge University Press. ISBN 978-1-139-99270-1.
- Søborg, Tobias Mosbæk (2020). Sigmatic Verbal Formations in Anatolian and Indo-European: A Cladistic Study (Thesis). University of Copenhagen, Department of Nordic Studies and Linguistics.
- Stipčević, Aleksandar (1976). "Simbolismo illirico e simbolismo albanese: appunti introduttivi". Iliria (in Italian). 5: 233–236. doi:10.3406/iliri.1976.1234.
- Stipčević, Aleksandar (1974). The Illyrians: history and culture (1977 ed.). Noyes Press. ISBN 978-0815550525.
- Stipčević, Aleksandar (1981). Kultni simboli kod Ilira: grada i prilozi sistematizaciji (in Croatian). Akademija Nauka i Umjetnosti Bosne i Hercegovine.
- Stipčević, Aleksandar (2002). Ilirët: Historia, Jeta, Kultura, Simbolet e Kultit. Tirana, Albania: Toena. ISBN 99927-1-609-6.

Stocker, Sharon R. (2009). Illyrian Apollonia: Toward a New Ktisis and Developmental History of the Colony.

- Tagliavini, Carlo (1963). Storia di parole pagane e cristiane attraverso i tempi (in Italian). Morcelliana.
- Tirta, Mark (2004). Petrit Bezhani (ed.). Mitologjia ndër shqiptarë (in Albanian). Tirana: Mësonjëtorja. ISBN 99927-938-9-9.
- West, Martin L. (2007). Indo-European Poetry and Myth. Oxford University Press. ISBN 978-0199280759.
- Wilkes, John J. (1992). The Illyrians. Oxford, United Kingdom: Blackwell Publishing. ISBN 0-631-19807-5.
- Zaninović, Marin (2007) [1965]. Ilirsko pleme Delmati (in Croatian). Ogranak Matice hrvatske Šibenik. ISBN 9789536163922.
