= Belenus =

Celtic deity

Belenos
- God of good health and healing waters
- Other names: Belenus, Belinos
- Venerated in: Roman Empire
- Major cult center: Aquileia
- Gender: Male
- Consort: Belisama (speculative)

Equivalents
- Roman: Apollo

Belenus (Gaulish: Belenos, Belinos) is an ancient Celtic healing god whose cult is attested across much of the Celtic-speaking world. While his principal centre of worship lay at Aquileia in northeastern Italy, and the deity is primarily associated with the Noricum region, mentions extend from the Italian peninsula to the British Isles, including Gaul, Aquitania, and Britain.

In Roman sources and inscriptions, Belenus was commonly identified with Apollo through interpretatio romana, especially in contexts associated with healing and therapeutic springs. Ancient authors such as Tertullian and Herodian describe him as a prominent protective and civic deity, notably at Aquileia, where he was regarded as the city's patron god. Archaeological and epigraphic evidence further indicate that his cult was closely connected with medicinal waters, sanctuaries, and, in some regions, oracular functions.

The etymology of Belenus remains debated. Traditional interpretations derived the name from a Proto-Indo-European root for brightness or whiteness, which encouraged solar interpretations. More recent scholarship, however, has proposed alternative explanations, including derivations connected with power, healing plants such as henbane, or water sources and springs. While no single etymology has gained universal acceptance, these interpretations broadly align with the god's well-attested associations with healing, protection, and water cults documented in epigraphic and archaeological sources.

Belenus appears to have predated the Roman period and may have originated as a Common Celtic deity, as suggested by the widespread attestation of his cult among ancient Celtic-speaking populations. Under Roman rule, he retained strong local importance, particularly in Noricum and the Alpine regions, where he functioned as a protective and healing god associated with springs and civic cults. His name also survives in personal names, place names, and later literary and folkloric traditions, suggesting a cultural legacy that extended beyond strictly cultic contexts.

== Name and etymology ==
The theonym Belenus (or Belinus), which is a latinised form of the Gaulish Belenos (or Belinos), appears in some 51 inscriptions. Although most of them are located in Aquileia (Friuli, Italy), the main centre of his cult, the name has also been found in places where Celtic speakers lived in ancient times, including in Noricum, Gaul, Aquitania, Britain, and possibly in Ireland.

Linguist Blanca María Prósper argues that Belinos was probably the original form, which also appears in the name Belyn (from an earlier Belinos), a Welsh leader who died in 627 AD. Known variants include Bellinus and perhaps Belus. The deity may also have been known in Ireland and Britain by the variants Bel, Beli, and Bile.

=== Etymology ===
The etymology of Belenos remains unclear. Traditionally, the name has been interpreted as meaning 'bright one' or the 'shining one', by connecting the first element to a Proto-Indo-European root *bʰelH-, often glossed as 'white, shining' (cf. Lithuanian báltas 'white', Greek phalós 'white', Armenian bal 'pallor', Gothic bala 'grey'). This theory was long reinforced by the interpretatio romana of Belenos as the 'Gaulish Apollo', a divinity with solar attributes. In recent scholarship, however, this etymology has been increasingly questioned. Xavier Delamarre observes that the cognates derived from *bʰelH- tend to denoted '[pale] white' or 'grey' rather than 'shining', and therefore may not support a solar interpretation.

An alternative hypothesis, advanced by Peter Schrijver and Helmut Birkhan, derives Belenos from the Indo-European root *bʰel-, designating the henbane, a psychoactive plant. In Gaulish, henbane was known as belenuntia, plausibly a derivative of Belenos, while in Latin it was called apollinaris. (Note: Compare with the cognates Welsh bela, Proto-Germanic *bel(u)nōn, and Proto-Slavic *bъlnъ. The form belenion, cited by Pseudo-Aristotle as a poisonous plant, appears to underlie Spanish beleño ('henbane'). The Gallo-Roman term belisa may also have been borrowed into Old High German as bilisa (cf. modern German Bilsenkraut 'henbane').) Schrijver links the name of another Celtic goddess, Belisama, to a stem *belis- attested in Gallo-Roman belisa ('henbane'), and compares it to the Gaulish divine name Belisa-maros, which Birkhan explains as 'great in henbane'. Given the widespread medicinal use of henbane in antiquity, this hypothesis has been taken as compatible with existing evidence of Belenos as a healing god. In this context, Birkhan has tentatively interpreted a shallow stone dish dedicated to Beleino from Saint-Chamas (southern France) as a vessel for hallucinogenic substances.

A different line of interpretation has been proposed by Patrizia de Bernardo Stempel, who suggests that Belenos may instead derive from a root *g^{w}elH-, meaning 'source, spring'. Marjeta Šašel Kos observes that Belenus is closely associated with water cults, as evidenced by dedications to Fons Beleni and by an altar where Belenus is worshipped alongside the Nymphs.

Finally, Delamarre has suggested deriving the name from the Gaulish stem belo- ('strong, powerful') attached to the suffix -nos ('lord, master'), yielding an interpretation of Belenos as the 'Master of Power'. In this framework, the goddess Belisama would be formed from the same stem bel(o)- with the intensive suffix -isama, and could thus be interpreted as 'the Very Powerful'.

=== Related terms ===
In pre-Roman Britain, a tribal leader bore the name Cunobelinos, which possibly means 'hound of Belenos'. Alternatively, if the name is not theophoric (that is, not derived from the god's name), it has been interpreted as meaning 'strong as a dog'. The Old Welsh personal name Liuelin derives from the compound *lugu-belinos, which may represent a pairing of two divine names, or instead mean 'strong as Lugus'.

A Brittonic form of Belenos has been proposed as the origin of the name of the Billingsgate ward in London, though this is often regarded as a folk etymology. Some scholars have also compared the name with the fountain of Belenton (now Bérenton) in the forest of Brocéliande in Brittany. In addition, the names of the Welsh and Irish ancestor-figures Beli Mawr and Bile have been suggested as potentially related.

Scholars also relate the deity's name to the Aquitanian anthroponym Belinatepos or Belanetepos (taken to have an equine association), and to the toponyms Beleño and Beloño.

== Historical cult ==
=== Origin ===
According to Helmut Birkhan, Belenus functioned as a typical oracle- and health-giving deity from the Carnian region, in the northeastern area of modern Friuli. Marjeta Šašel Kos argues that the worship of Belenus spread from Noricum to nearby centres such as Aquileia and Iulium Carnicum (modern Zuglio).

Although Belenus was often associated with the Graeco-Roman god Apollo, his cult appears to have retained a degree of independence during the Roman period. The god's widespread attestation among ancient Celtic peoples may plausibly point to a Common Celtic origin of the cult. In any case, it likely predated the Roman period.

=== Consort ===
Images of Belenus sometimes depict him alongside a female figure, which some scholars speculate to be the Gaulish deity Belisama. In addition, the river name Bienne (recorded as Biena in 1337 AD) and the place name Bienne (Belnam in 1142 AD), attest to the existence of a feminine form *Belenā.

In Noricum, Belenus may also have been associated with an otherwise unknown female deity named Belestis, (Note: Also Beléna, Beléstis Augústa, Beléstris, Belínca) possibly venerated as a goddess of nature and fertility. Two shrines dedicated to this goddess were found at Podljubelj in the Karawanks mountains.

== Attestations ==
=== Italy ===
Around 240 AD, Herodian mentions the worship of Belenus in Aquileia, where he was regarded as the city's patron god. During the siege of Aquileia in 238 by emperor Maximinus Thrax, Belenus was invoked as the city's divine protector. Soldiers claimed to have seen the god appear in the air, fighting on behalf of the city, an episode reminiscent of Apollo's defence of Delphi against the forces of Brennos. Dedications to a Fons B[eleni] ('Fountain of Belenos') also show connection with medicinal springs. A village that is now part of the municipality of Aquileia is still named Beligna.

A further 6 votive inscriptions of Belenus were discovered at Altinum, Concordia and Iulium Carnicum. Epigraphic dedications to the god are also known in Rome, Venice and Rimini. A votive inscription from Caesarean times by the poet Lucius Erax Bardus was found near Bardonecchia, in the Graian Alps.

=== Noricum ===
Tertullian, writing in c. 200 AD, identifies Belenus as the national god of Noricum. Belenus was an important god at Iulium Carnicum (modern Zuglio), a town close to the border with Noricum inhabited by the Celtic Carni. A sanctuary dedicated to the deity is attested by the second half of the 1st century BC, when its renovation was commemorated by two chiefs of the village. An altar was also found in Celeia (modern Celje), one of the most important Norican towns. The cult may have been introduced at Celeia from Aquileia, as suggested by the name of its dedicator, Lucius Sentius Forensis, the Sentii being well attested to at Aquileia, but not in Noricum.

=== Gaul and Aquitania ===
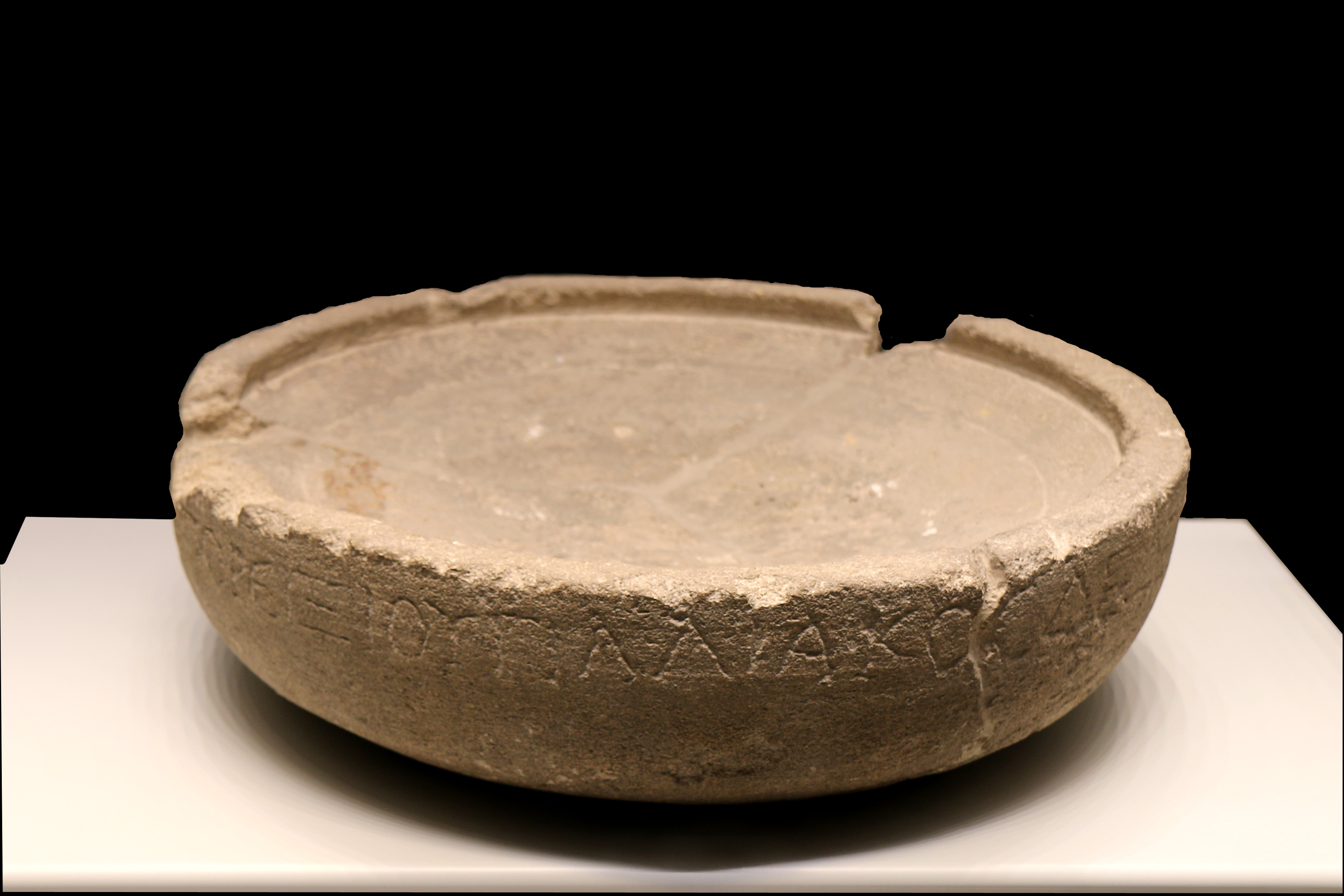
Bowl dedicated to Belenus (Marseille History Museum).

The deity was known in southern France, as attested by inscriptions from Marseille, Saint-Chamas, Gréasque, Calissanne and Saint-Rémy. A gem dedicated to Belenus has been discovered at Nîmes, depicting an elderly figure adorned with star-like symbols.

In Central France at Aquae Borvonis (Bourbon-Lancy), the Aedui worshipped Belenus in association with health giving waters. Belenus was also venerated at Clermont-Ferrand, and had a temple at the sacred healing springs of Sainte-Sabine, where Apollo Belenus was invoked by pilgrims in search of cures for illness. Stone images of swaddled infants were dedicated at the shrine, presumably in the hope of healing.

Ausonius (late 4th century AD) alludes to sanctuaries dedicated to Belenus in Aquitania, and mentions a temple priest of the cult named Phoebicius. Given the lack of epigraphic confirmation, Bernhard Maier has suggested that the name Belenus here functions as a learned circumlocution for Apollo.

== Related beliefs ==
=== Medieval Ireland ===
The Irish Bel has been speculated by some scholars to be linked to the god Belenus. Fires in honor of the deity were lit for the Celtic festivals of Beltaine ('Bel's Fires') on May 1. On occasion, cattle was driven between two fires in order to repeal diseases, which Schrijver has compared to the traditional German custom of burning henbane collected on Midsummer to protect the cattle against diseases and witchcraft.

=== Modern Slovenia ===
The Slovenian divinity Belin, recorded in the 19th century by the historian Simon Rutar, may reflect the survival of Belenus' cult in the region and its later integration into Slovenian folk beliefs, possibly blended with attributes of the Slavic god Belibog. In local tradition, Belin was regarded as a great healer, believed to cure blindness with his 'key'. Folklorist Monika Kropej has also suggested that Belenus may have entered Slovenian folklore in the form of the beliči, a type of fairy-like beings. An incised stone in southwestern Slovenia, locally known as berlina, may also be related. It is connected to ancient rituals and features two primitively carved figures with heads ornamented with rays.

== Legacy ==
=== Science ===
The minor planet 11284 Belenus is named after him, as is the star Bélénos.

=== Popular culture ===
The Gauls of the Asterix franchise often swear by Belenos and Toutatis.
