= Paleo-Balkans =

Paleo-Balkans refers to:

- Prehistoric Balkans
- Paleo-Balkan languages
- Paleo-Balkan peoples
  - Thracians
  - Dacians
  - Illyrians
  - Ancient Greeks
    - List of Ancient Greek tribes
- Paleo-Balkanic mythology
