= Andinus =

Illyrian deity

Andinus is an Illyrian god worshipped among the Dardanians, in the Roman province of Moesia Superior. He is considered to have been the indigenous god of vegetation and soil fertility. (Note: The Proto-Albanian root *andī̆(-) means 'bloom/blossom', 'pollen', cognate of Ancient Greek: ἄνθος ánthos (cf. antho-) 'flower, germ, sprout', and Vedic Sanskrit: अन्धस् ándhas 'sóma, grass, herb'.) The god is attested in votive inscriptions from Kosovo, one clearly readable found in Kaçanik, and the other more difficult to read found in Vushtrri.

Personal names such as Andio, Andia, etc. were common among the Dardanians, and they are considered to be derived from the name of the Dardanian god. As the region of Kosovo was located on the road that went from the Adriatic Sea to Dacia, personal names like Ulpius Andinus or Ulpia Andia appeared among new citizens in the area during the reign of Trajan.

== See also ==
- Illyrian mythology

== Bibliography ==
- Ferri, Naser (2006). "Simpoziumi ndërkombëtar mbi Dioklecianin dhe epokën e tij (i mbajtur në Split më 18-22 shtator 2005)" [International Symposium on Diocletian and his period (held in Split from 18-22 September 2005)]. In Drançolli, Jahja (ed.). Kosova Archeologica - Kosova Arkeologjike. Instituti Arkeologjik i Kosovës [Archaeological Institute of Kosova]. pp. 222–230.
- Krahe, Hans (1946). "Die illyrische Naniengebung (Die Götternamen)". Jarhbücher f. d. Altertumswiss. pp. 199–204. S2CID 54995190.
- Mócsy, András (2014) [1974]. Pannonia and Upper Moesia: A History of the Middle Danube Provinces of the Roman Empire. Routledge. ISBN 9781317754251.
- Zeqo, Moikom (2016). "Zef Mirdita, dijetari i madh shqiptar i formatit evropian". Studime Albanologjike. 13. Instituti i Trashëgimisë Shpirtërore e Kulturore të Shqiptarëve – Shkup: 13–20. ISSN 1857-6958.
