= Belisama =

Celtic goddess

Belesama
- Other names: Belisama
- Venerated in: Gaul
- Gender: Female
- Consort: Belenus (speculative)

Equivalents
- Roman: Minerva

Belisama (Gaulish Belesama; epigraphically Bηλησαμα) is a Celtic goddess. She was equated by Roman commentators with Minerva by interpretatio romana.

== Name ==
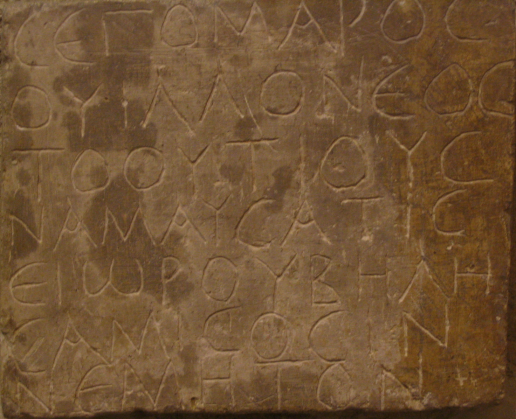
photograph of the "Segomaros" inscription

The Gaulish theonym Belesama has been traditionally interpreted as meaning 'the very bright', stemming from the Indo-European root *bʰelH- ('white, shining'; cf. Lith. báltas 'white', Greek φαλός phalós 'white', Arm. bal 'pallor', goth. bala 'grey') attached to the superlative suffix *-isamā. As for Belenos, however, this theory has come under increasing criticism in contemporary scholarship.

Xavier Delamarre notes that the proposed cognates stemming from *bʰelH- do not seem to connote 'shining', but rather 'white, grey, pale', and proposes to derive the name from the Gaulish root belo- ('strong, powerful'), rendering Belesama as 'the very strong' (cf. Sanskrit baliṣṭhaḥ 'the strongest'). Alternatively, Peter Schrijver has conjectured a connection with the stem for 'henbane', *beles-, attached to an unknown suffix -ma, by comparing the name with the Gaulish theonym Belisa-maros. According to him, this is "formally attractive and semantically possible (if *Belesama = Lat. Minerva medica) but not supported by direct evidence".

The toponyms Beleymas, Bellême, Balesmes (from Belesma), Blesmes (from Belesma), Blismes (from Belisma), and Velesmes are based on the theonym. The name also appears in various river names of Gauls and Britain, including Belisama (River Ribble) and Le Blima (Tarn). The Galatian personal name Blesamius, from an earlier *Belesamios, may also be added to the comparison.

== Attestations ==
=== Gaul ===
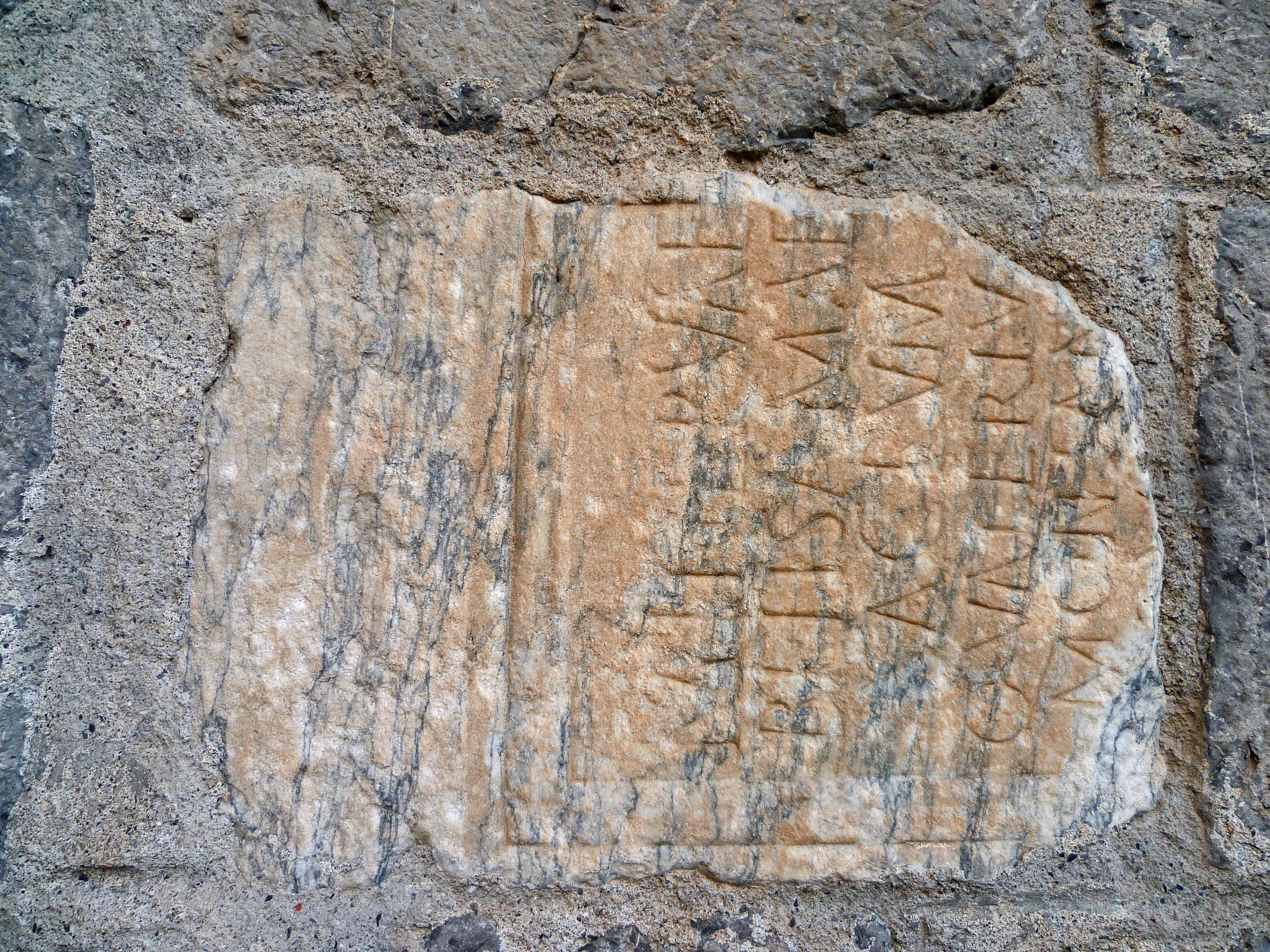
photograph of the Saint-Lizier inscription

A Gaulish inscription found at Vaison-la-Romaine (Provence, France) commemorates the establishment of a nemeton (sacred grove) in her honour.

СΕΓΟΜΑΡΟС/ ΟΥΙΛΛΟΝΕΟС/ ΤΟΟΥΤΙΟΥС/ ΝΑΜΑΥСΑΤΙС/ ΕΙѠΡΟΥ ΒΗΛΗ/СΑΜΙ СΟСΙΝ/ ΝΕΜΗΤΟΝ
Segomaros Ouilloneos tooutious Namausatis eiōrou Bēlēsami sosin nemēton
"Segomarus Uilloneos, citizen [toutius] of Namausus, dedicated this sanctuary to Belesama"

The identification with Minerva in Gallo-Roman religion is established in a Latin inscription from Consoranni (modern Saint-Lizier).

Minervae / Belisamae / sacrum / Q(uintus) Valerius / Montan[us] / [e]x v[oto?]

=== Britain ===
The presence of the goddess in Ancient Britain is more difficult to establish. Ptolemy's reference to an estuary of Belesama (Βελεσαμα), identified with the river Ribble or Mersey, may suggest that she was a tutelary goddess of the region. Ronald Hutton also postulated that the name of Samlesbury may derive from a corruption of the theonym.

== Theories ==
According to James MacKillop, the attestation of Belisama as a river name may indicate that she was a lake- and river-goddess.

Belisama has also been speculatively claimed as companion of Belenos, whose name appears to contain the same root.

== See also ==
- 178 Belisana, asteroid named after the goddess
- HD 8574 b, extrasolar planet named after the goddess
