= Celtic Animism =

Spiritual belief of the ancient Celts

According to classical sources, the ancient Celts were animists. They honoured the forces of nature, saw the world as inhabited by many spirits, and saw the Divine manifesting in aspects of the natural world.

== The Sacred Land ==
The Celts of the ancient world believed that many spirits and divine beings inhabited the world around them, and that humans could establish a rapport with these beings. The archaeological and the literary record indicate that ritual practice in Celtic societies lacked a clear distinction between the sacred and profane; rituals, offerings, and correct behaviour maintained a balance between gods, spirits and humans, and harnessed supernatural forces for the benefit of the community.

The Celtic religion perceived the presence of the supernatural as integral to, and interwoven with, the material world. Every mountain, river, spring, marsh, tree and rocky outcrop was inspirited. While the polytheistic cultures of ancient Greece and Rome revolved around urban life, ancient Celtic society was predominantly rural. The close link with the natural world is reflected in what we know of the religious systems of Celtic Europe during the late 1st millennium BCE and early 1st millennium CE. As in many polytheistic systems, the local spirits honoured were those of both the wild and cultivated landscapes and their inhabitants. As Anne Ross observed: "... god-types, as opposed to individual universal Gaulish deities, are to be looked for as an important feature of the religion of the Gauls ... and the evidence of epigraphy strongly supports this conclusion." As what some may consider spirits are considered by other authors to be deities, the list of Celtic deities derived from local inscriptions can at times be rather long.

The ancient Celts venerated the spirits who inhabited local mountains, forests and springs. Certain animals were seen as messengers of the spirits or gods. In tribal territories, the ground and waters which received the dead were imbued with sanctity and revered by their living relatives. Sanctuaries were sacred spaces separated from the ordinary world, often in natural locations such as springs, sacred groves, or lakes. Many topographical features were honored as the abodes of powerful spirits or deities, with geographical features named for tutelary deities. Offerings of jewellery, weapons or foodstuffs were placed in offering pits and bodies of water dedicated to these beings. These offerings linked the donor to the place and spirits in a concrete way.

== Honouring the Waters ==
The spirits of watery places were honoured as givers of life and as links between the physical realm and the other world. Sequana, for example, seems to have embodied the River Seine at its spring source, and Sulis appears to have been one and the same as the hot spring at Bath, Somerset, (Roman Aquae Sulis) not simply its guardian or possessor.

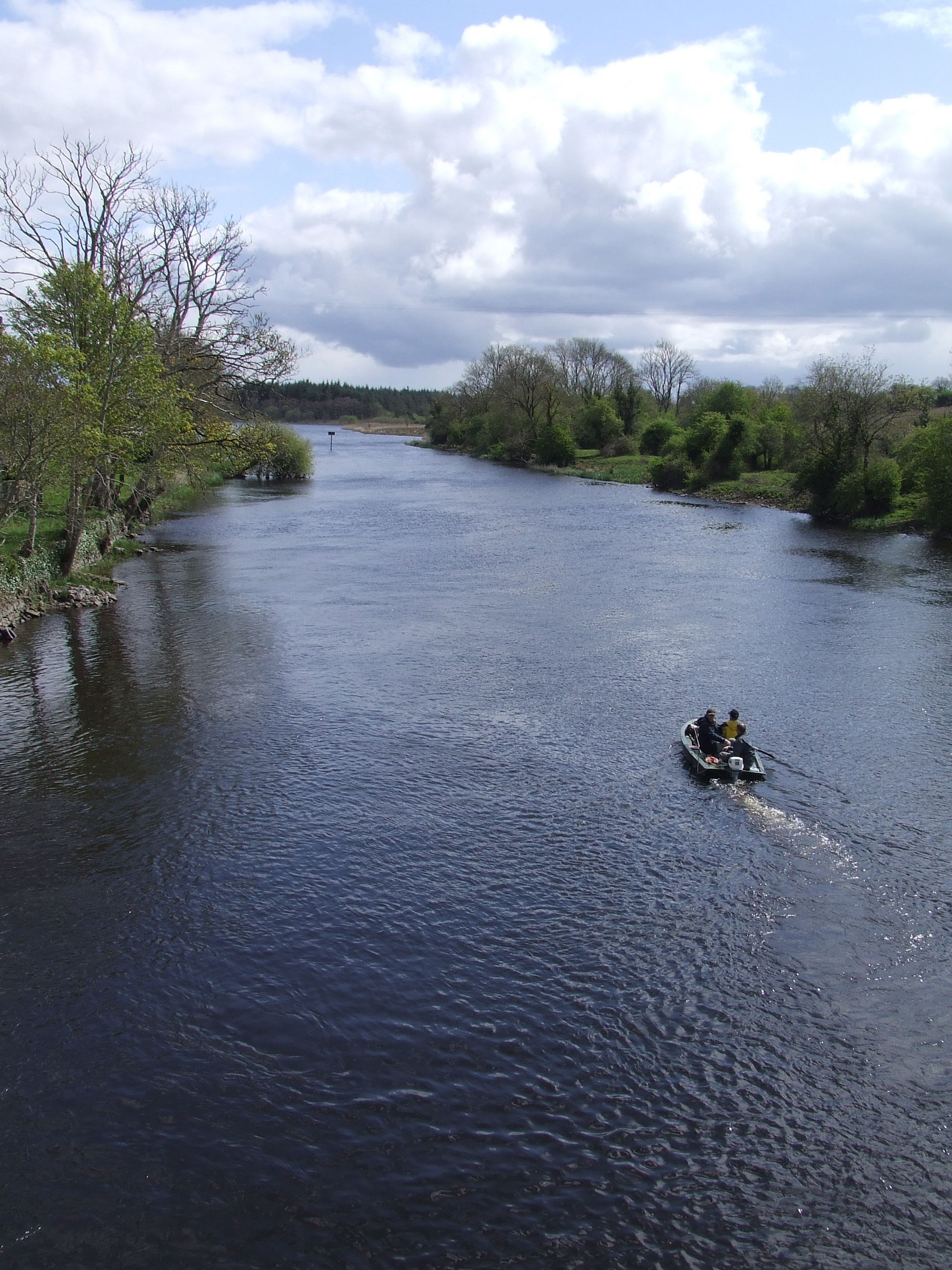
The River Shannon, (Irish: Abhainn na Sionainne) County Leitrim, Ireland

In Ireland, the tutelary goddesses Boann and Sionnan give their names to the rivers Boyne and Shannon, and the tales of these goddesses are the origin stories of the rivers themselves. The threefold goddess Brighid is associated with a number of holy wells and The Morrígan is connected with the River Unius.

There is abundant evidence for the veneration of water by the Celts and indeed by their Bronze Age forebears. In the Pre-Roman Iron Age, lakes, rivers, springs and bogs received special offerings of metalwork, wooden objects, animals and, occasionally, of human beings. By the Roman period, the names of some water-deities were recorded on inscriptions or were included in contemporary texts. The ancient name for the River Marne was Dea Matrona (Goddess Matron); the Seine was Sequana; the Severn, Sabrina; the Wharfe, Verbeia; the Saône, Souconna; there are countless others.

Natural springs were foci for healing cults: Sulis was prayed to as a healer at Aquae Sulis and the goddess Arnemetia was hailed as a healer at Aquae Arnemetiae. Nemausus, for example, was not only the Gallic name for the town of Nîmes but also that of its presiding spring-god. He had a set of three female counterparts, the Nemausicae. In the same region, the town of Glanum possessed a god called Glanis: an altar from a sacred spring is inscribed to Glanis and the Glanicae.

== Spirits of the Weather and the Skies ==
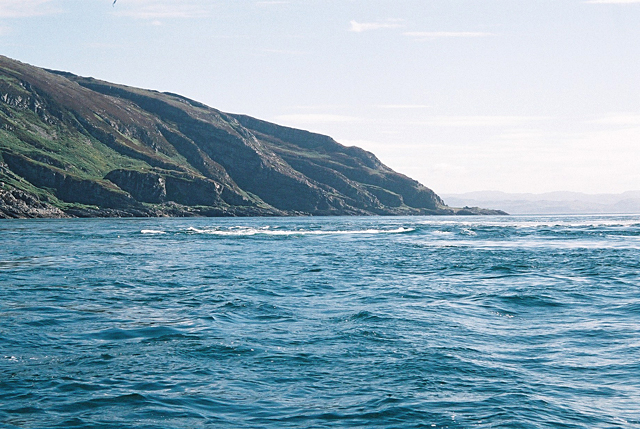
The Corryvreckan whirlpool (Scottish Gaelic: Coire Bhreacain - 'cauldron of the plaid') washtub of the Cailleach

Meteorological patterns and phenomena, especially wind, rain and thunder, were acknowledged as inspirited and propitiated. Inscribed dedications and iconography in the Roman period show that these spirits were personifications of natural forces. Taranis's name indicates not that he was the god of thunder but that he actually was thunder. Archaeological evidence suggests that the thunder was perceived as especially potent. Inscriptions to Taranis the 'Thunderer' have been found in Britain, Gaul, Germany and the former Yugoslavia and the Roman poet Lucan mentions him as a savage god who demanded human sacrifice.

In the insular Celtic lands, Lugh is seen as a god of the storms, as are the Cailleachan – Scottish storm hags – and the Cailleach herself, who brings the first winter snows to the land by washing her great plaid (Gaelic: féileadh mòr) in the Whirlpool of Coire Bhreacain. This process is said to take three days, during which the roar of the coming tempest is heard as far away as twenty miles (32 km) inland. When she is finished, her plaid is pure white and snow covers the land.

From the early Bronze Age, people in much of temperate Europe used the spoked wheel to represent Taranis. The Romans imported their own celestial god, Jupiter, to continental Celtic lands by interpretatio Romana, and his imagery was merged with that of a native deity to produce a hybrid sky-deity who resembled the Roman god but who had additional solar attributes. Altars decorated with wheels were set up by Roman soldiers stationed at Hadrian's Wall, and also by supplicants in Cologne and Nîmes.

== Sacred Trees ==
The Celts believed that trees had spirits and revered certain trees. The most sacred trees of Ireland were the bíle trees - old, sacred trees that stood in a central area and were often the social and ceremonial meeting place for a tribe or village. According to the Dindsenchas (lore of Irish places), the five sacred bíles of Ireland were the Ash of Tortu, the Bole of Ross (a yew tree), the Oak of Mugna, and the Ash of Dathi. These trees were associated with the five Irish provinces then in existence.

== Animals as Omens and Emblems ==
Among both the Continental and Insular Celts, the behaviour of certain animals and birds were observed for omens, and certain spirits were closely associated with particular animals. The names of Artio, the ursine goddess, and Epona, the equine goddess, are based on Celtic words for bear and horse, respectively. In Ireland, the Morrígan is associated with crows, wolves, and horses, among other creatures, and in Scotland Brighid's animals include snakes and cattle.

Certain creatures were observed to have particular physical and mental qualities and characteristics, and distinctive patterns of behaviour. An animal like a stag or horse could be admired for its beauty, speed, or virility. Dogs were seen to be keen-scented, good at hunting, guarding, and healing.

Deer (who shed antlers) suggest cycles of growth; in Ireland they are sacred to the goddess Flidais, while in Scotland they are guarded by the Cailleach. Snakes were seen to be emblematic of long (possibly eternal) life, being able to shed their skin and renew themselves. Beavers were seen to be skillful workers in wood. Thus admiration and acknowledgment for a beast's essential nature led easily to reverence of those qualities and abilities which humans did not possess at all or possessed only partially.

== The Hunt ==
Hunting deities, whose role acknowledges the economic importance of animals and the ritual of the hunt, highlight a different relationship to nature. The animal elements in half-human, antlered deities suggest that the forest and its denizens possessed a numinous quality as well as an economic value.

Hunter-gods were venerated among the Continental Celts, and they often seem to have had an ambivalent role as protector both of the hunter and the prey, not unlike the functions of Diana and Artemis in classical mythology. From Gaul, the armed deer-hunter depicted on an image from the temple of Le Donon in the Vosges lays his hands in benediction on the antlers of his stag companion. The hunter-god from Le Touget in Gers carries a hare tenderly in his arms. Arduinna, the eponymous boar-goddess of the Ardennes, rides her ferocious quarry, knife in hand, whilst the boar-god of Euffigneix in the Haute-Marne is portrayed with the motif of a boar with bristles erect, striding along his torso, which implies conflation between the human animal perception of divinity. Arawn of Welsh mythology may represent the remnants of a similar hunter-god of the forests of Dyfed. Additionally, in Welsh mythology the hunting of a sacred stag often leads the hunters into the otherworld.

As with many traditional societies, the hunt was probably hedged about with prohibitions and rituals. The Greek author Arrian, writing in the 2nd century CE, said that the Celts never went hunting without the gods' blessing and that they made payment of domestic animals to the supernatural powers in reparation for their theft of wild creatures from the landscape. Hunting itself may have been perceived as a symbolic, as well as practical, activity in which the spilling of blood led not only to the death of the beast but also to the earth's nourishment and replenishment.

== See also ==
- Ancient Celtic religion
- Proto-Celtic paganism
