= 178 Belisana =

Main-belt asteroid

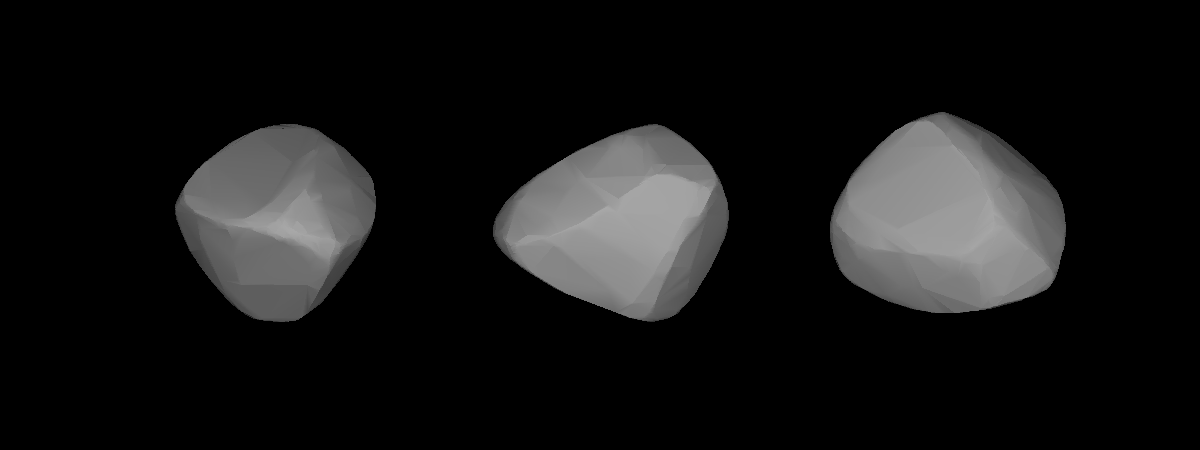
- Lightcurve-based 3D-model of Belisana

Discovery
- Discovered by: J. Palisa
- Discovery site: Austrian Naval Obs.
- Discovery date: 6 November 1877

Designations
- Pronunciation: /bɛˈlɪsənə/
- Named after: Bēlēsama (Celtic mythology)
- Alternative designations: A877 VB; 1899 LE; 1904 UA; 1935 UA_{1}
- Minor planet category: main-belt · (inner) background

Orbital characteristics
- Epoch 23 March 2018 (JD 2458200.5)
- Uncertainty parameter 0
- Observation arc: 132.36 yr (48,345 d)
- Aphelion: 2.5667 AU
- Perihelion: 2.3536 AU
- Semi-major axis: 2.4601 AU
- Eccentricity: 0.0433
- Orbital period (sidereal): 3.86 yr (1,409 d)
- Mean anomaly: 272.93°
- Mean motion: 0° 15^{m} 19.44^{s} / day
- Inclination: 1.8950°
- Longitude of ascending node: 51.109°
- Argument of perihelion: 212.67°

Physical characteristics
- Mean diameter: 35.50 km (derived); 35.81±0.9 km 38.26±1.12 km 42.09±11.05 km
- Synodic rotation period: 12.31±0.07 h 12.32±0.05 h 12.321±0.003 h 12.323±0.002 h 24.6510±0.0003 h
- Geometric albedo: 0.2026 (derived); 0.214±0.016; 0.22±0.09; 0.2438±0.013
- Spectral type: Tholen = S SMASS = S · S B–V = 0.904; U–B = 0.486
- Absolute magnitude (H): 9.38; 9.4; 9.52; 9.6; 9.66±0.79

178 Belisana is a stony background asteroid from the inner regions of the asteroid belt, approximately 38 kilometers (24 miles) in diameter. It was discovered on 6 November 1877, by Austrian astronomer Johann Palisa at the Austrian Naval Observatory in today's Croatia. The S-type asteroid has a rotation period of 12.32 hours and a rather spherical shape. It was named after the Celtic goddess Belisama (Belisana).

== Orbit and classification ==
Belisana is a non-family asteroid from the main belt's background population. It orbits the Sun in the inner main-belt at a distance of 2.4–2.6 AU once every 3 years and 10 months (1,409 days; semi-major axis of 2.46 AU). Its orbit has an eccentricity of 0.04 and an inclination of 2° with respect to the ecliptic.

== Physical characteristics ==
Belisana has been characterized as a common, stony S-type asteroid in both the Tholen and SMASS classification.

=== Rotation period ===
Photometric observations of this asteroid from multiple observatories during 2007 gave a light curve with a period of 12.321 ± 0.002 hours and a brightness variation of 0.10 ± 0.03 in magnitude. This is in agreement with a study performed in 1992. However, it is possible that the light curve may have a period of 24.6510 ± 0.0003 hours; it will require further study to exclude this solution.

=== Diameter and albedo ===
According to the surveys carried out by the Infrared Astronomical Satellite IRAS, the Japanese Akari satellite and the NEOWISE mission of NASA's Wide-field Infrared Survey Explorer, Belisana measures between 35.81 and 42.09 kilometers in diameter and its surface has an albedo between 0.214 and 0.2438.

The Collaborative Asteroid Lightcurve Link derives an albedo of 0.2026 and a diameter of 35.50 kilometers based on an absolute magnitude of 9.6.

== Naming ==
This minor planet was named after the goddess Belisama (or Belisana) from Celtic mythology, meaning "queen of heaven", the most warlike goddess among British Celts, and equivalent to the goddesses Athene or Minerva. The official naming citation was mentioned in The Names of the Minor Planets by Paul Herget in 1955 (H 22).
