= Proto-Celtic religion =

Beliefs of Proto-Celtic speakers

Proto-Celtic religion refers to the belief systems attributed to the speakers of the Proto-Celtic language, and encompasses mythological themes, legendary narratives, folk traditions and cosmological concepts that can be reconstructed for early Celtic culture. Proto-Celtic is generally dated to the Late Bronze Age (c. 1200–900 BC), and any reconstruction of Proto-Celtic religion therefore predates the historically attested religions of the Ancient Celts.

Through the comparative method, Celtic philologists and historical linguists have proposed reconstructions of deities, mythic figures, ritual concepts, and mythical place-names, with varying degrees of scholarly confidence (reconstructed forms are conventionally marked with an asterisk). These reconstructions draw primarily on linguistic evidence and comparative analysis, and are supplemented by later literary, epigraphic, and archaeological sources. Modern scholarship therefore stresses methodological restraint, treating Proto-Celtic religion as a constellation of related traditions rather than a fully reconstructible, homogeneous belief system.

== Reconstruction framework ==
=== Chronology ===
According to linguist John T. Koch, the period c. 1200–900 BC is appropriate for the existence of a unified, and possibly geographically expansive, Proto-Celtic language. The Proto-Celtic homeland is generally associated in scholarship with the Urnfield culture (c. 1300–700 BC) and the early Hallstatt Iron Age (c. 800–750 BC) in Central Europe.

The period around 900 BC is commonly identified with the breakup of Proto-Celtic into distinct branches (Hispano-Celtic versus Gallo-Brittonic and Goidelic, or Continental versus Insular Celtic).

=== Sources and methodology ===
The beliefs of the Proto-Celtic speakers cannot be reconstructed as a coherent or unified system, as no direct descriptions or indigenous religious writings survive from the Proto-Celtic period. Reconstruction instead relies on a combination of indirect sources from later periods, including Classical accounts by Greek and Roman authors (such as Caesar, Strabo, and Lucan), ancient inscriptions (notably theonyms and dedicatory formulas), early medieval Irish and Welsh literature, archaeological evidence, and comparative Indo-European linguistics. These sources differ widely in date, genre, and cultural context, and many are shaped by external perspectives or later Christian reinterpretation, providing fragmentary insights into inherited beliefs and practices rather than a systematic theology. Several motifs traditionally described as "Celtic" are also attested in other European traditions, particularly Germanic, suggesting that some elements may reflect shared Indo-European traditions rather than uniquely Celtic religious concepts.

Aspects of Proto-Celtic religion are reconstructed by identifying recurrent patterns across regions and periods. Where semantic continuity can be reasonably established, this also involves comparing cognate religious terms preserved in different Celtic languages. Some elements are considered among the more securely reconstructed aspects of Proto-Celtic paganism, particularly the sacral role of poets (*bardos), druids (*druwides), and seers (*wātis), as well as the recurrence of certain shared divine names (notably *Lugus). (Note: Apart from cognates attested in medieval Celtic languages, this threefold distinction of Celtic men of learning is already mentioned in 1st century BC by Diodorus Siculus ("They have lyric poets called bards, who, accompanied by instruments resembling lyres, sing both praise and satire. They have highly honoured philosophers and theologians [those who speak about the gods] called druids. They also make use of seers, who are greatly respected") [5.31] and in the 1st century AD by Strabo ("As a rule, among all the Gallic peoples three sets of men are honoured above all others: the bards, the vātes, and the druids. The bards are singers and poets, the vātes overseers of sacred rites and philosophers of nature, and the druids, besides being natural philosophers, practice moral philosophy as well") [4.4.4].) A number of shared concepts likewise appear to have been closely tied to the natural environment, including sacred groves (*nemetom), mountains, lakes, and springs. Despite these common elements, claims of pan-Celtic uniformity are therefore treated with caution in Celtic scholarship, which instead points to a "tangible relationship based upon common inheritance" rather than a fully unified religious system.

== Cognate terms ==
The reconstructions presented in this section are proposed by historical linguists and philologists on the basis of the comparative method, which infers earlier linguistic forms through systematic comparison of cognate evidence across related Celtic languages and, where relevant, the wider Indo-European linguistic family. Reconstructed forms are conventionally marked with an asterisk (*), while forms whose attribution to the Proto-Celtic period is uncertain are preceded by a question mark (?).

In the case of religious terminology and mythological motifs, reconstruction is often complicated by the long chronological gap between the Proto-Celtic period (c. 1200–900 BC), the earliest available evidence of ancient Celtic religious beliefs (mainly from the late 1st millennium BC to the early 1st millennium AD), and the medieval Celtic textual traditions (c. 7th–12th centuries AD).

=== Deities ===
Proto-Celtic reconstruction	Ancient	Goidelic	Brittonic	Etymology	Notes
*Belenos	Gaul. Belenus	–	W Belyn	Traditionally derived from PIE *bʰelH- ('white, shining'), although this has come under criticism in recent scholarship.	The river name Bienne and the place name Bienne attest of a feminine form *Belenā. His widespread attestation among ancient Celtic peoples may point to a Common Celtic origin of the cult. See Belenos for further discussion.
? *Bodwos	–	OIr. Bodb	–	From Celtic–Germanic *b^{h}od^{h}wo- ('battle, fight').	Name of a war divinity. Also attested as a personal name in Gaulish Boduos. A term common to Celtic and Germanic, where a war-goddess is known as Badu-henna. The meaning 'crow', a bird symbolising the carnage in battle, is secondary in Celtic languages. Middle Irish bodb must be understood as the 'bird on the battlefield and manifestation of the war-goddess'. See Bodb Derg and Badb for further discussion.
*Brigantī ~ Brigantia	Gaul. *Brigantia	OIr. Brigit	OBritt. Brigantia	From PIE *b^{h}erǵ^{h}- ('be high, hill').	The stem Brigant- is attested in numerous river names (which are typically deified in ancient Celtic cultures), such as Briande, Briance, Bregenzer, or Brent, and in toponyms such as Bragança (< *Brigantia). See Brigid and Brigantia (goddess) for further discussion.
*Flitawī	Gaul. Litaui	OIr. Letha	OW Litau, OBret. Letau	From PIE *plth_{2}wih_{2} ('the Broad One, i.e. Earth').	Derived from an epithet of the PIE earth-goddess, *pl̥th₂éwih₂ (the 'Broad One'; cf. Sanskrit Pṛth(i)vī). Names for Brittany in medieval Celtic languages. See Litavis and Dʰéǵʰōm for further discussion.
*Gobann-	Gaul. Gobannos	OIr. Goibniu	MW Govannon	From PCelt. *goban- ('smith').	The Gaulish, Irish and Welsh forms diverge and are reconstructed as *Gobannos, as Gobeniyū ~ *Gobanniyū, and as Gobannonos, respectively. Despite this, they regarded as cognate figures by modern scholars. See also personal name Gobannitio, and characters Gobannus, Goibniu and Gofannon for further discussion.
? Kaikos	–	OIr. Cáech	–	Cognate with PGerm. *haihaz ('one-eyed'; cf. ON Hárr) and, with a slightly different meaning, with PIt. *kaikos ('blind').	Possibly a divine epithet meaning 'One-Eyed, blind in one eye', comparable to ON Hárr, a byname of Óðinn. Hyllested notes that Lug closes one eye in a ritual context, while one-eyedness is a defining trait of Óðinn in Germanic mythology; Koch further points to destructive one-eyed figures in Early Irish tradition, such as Ingcél Cáech in Togail Bruidne Da Derga and Balor in Cath Maige Tuired. Also attested as a noun in OCo. cuic and MW coec ('blind, one-eyed, squinting').
? *Kaleto-bolkos	–	OIr. Caladbolg	MW Caledfwlch	From PCelt. *kaleto- ('hard') attached to *bolko- ('gap').	The compound may mean 'hard cleft', 'cleaving what is hard', or 'cleaving through the hardship [of battle]', senses fitting the sword's role in the Táin. It remains unclear whether this reflects a Common Celtic inheritance or later inter-Celtic borrowings. See Caladbolg and Excalibur for further discussion.
*Lugus	Gaul. Lugus, CIb. Luguei	OIr. Lug	MW Llew	Unclear etymology.	At the origin of the PCelt. compound *Lugu-deks ('serving Lugus'; cf. Gaul. Lugudeca, OIr. Lugaid). According to Koch, Caesar's description of the Gaulish Mercury 'inventor of all crafts' echoes Lug's epithet samildánach ('possessing many skills'), pointing to a shared conception as the divine entity of an itinerant Celtic artisan class. See Lugus for further discussion.
*Mak^{w}onos	Gaul. Maponos	OIr. *Maccan Oc (> Macán)	OBritt. Mapono, MW Mabon	A thematicizer n-stem of PCelt. *makʷos ('son').	Most commentators advance that Maponos contributes to the conception of the Welsh Mabon. The deity is also equated with the Irish Angus Óg, especially when he is referred to by the patronymic Mac Óc. See Maponos for further discussion.
*Mātronā	Gaul. Matrona	–	MW Modron	A thematicized n-stem of PCelt. *mātīr, gen. *mātros ('mother').	Name of mother goddesses worshipped in ancient Gaul and Britain. Gave rise to the Welsh Modron and Madrun, both of whom are mythical mothers. See Matronae for further discussion.
*Noudonts	Nodonti, Nodenti	OIr. Núadu	MW Nudd	Unclear etymology.	Ancient Celtic god associated with dogs and healing and aquatic quality. Nodenti is the dative singular of *Nodens. See Nodens for further discussion.
*Og(o)miyos	Gaul. Ogmios	MIr. Ogma	–	An -iyos derivate of PCelt. *ogmos (perhaps 'path, orbit').	Helmut Birkhan has questioned the link between Gaulish Ogmios, Irish Ogma, and Old Welsh Oumid, while allowing that the discrepancies might be partly explained by a syllable loss in an earlier *Ogomios or *Ogumios.
? *Olo-(p)atīr	–	MIr. Ollathair	–	Identical to PGmc *Ala-fader (cf. Old Norse Alföðr).	An epithet meaning 'all-father', used as a byname of the Dagda. It has been compared with the Old Norse Alföðr, commonly used for Odin. Perhaps from a shared Celtic-Germanic epithet *Olo-patēr.
*Tonaros > *Toranos	Gaul. Tanarus, Taranis	–	OBritt. Tanaro, Pict. Taran	Identical to the Proto-Germanic Thunder-god *Þun(a)raz (Thor). From PIE *(s)tenh₂-ros ('thunder').	Dedications to Taranis have been found across Europe (France, Germany, Britain, Northern Italy, eastern Europe), thus widespread Celtic depictions of thunderbolt-wielding deities may represent the god. See Taranis for further discussion.
? *Tworkos treyatū	–	OIr. Torc Tríath	W Twrch Trwyth	From PCelt. *tworkos ('boar') attached to *treyatū.	The Irish word tríath means 'king', 'boar' or 'sea, wave', aptly reflected in Twrch Trwyth's portrayal as a noble boar and a sea-crossing swimmer. The Welsh spelling trwyt, which does occur, could be the exact cognate of triath, implying PCelt. *treyatū. Along with Caladbolg ~ Caledfwlch and Findabair ~ Gwenhwyfar, this figure could reflect a nucleus of old inter-Celtic borrowings or inherited elements in Arthurian tradition. See Twrch Trwyth for further discussion.
*Windos	Gaul. Vindonnus, Galat. Uindieinos	OIr. Finn (mac Cumhaill)	W Gwyn (ap Nudd)	'The White One'. From PCelt. *windos ('white').	Finn can also denote spiritual 'enlightenment' or 'blessing', a sense shared with Welsh gwyn and Breton gwenn, and related verbs are found in Old Irish ro·finnadar ('discovers, comes to know') and Welsh gwn ('I know'), leading Koch to argue for an archaic mythic motif in which a hero moves from being finn ('fair-haired') to becoming esoterically 'blessed' or 'self-revealed'. Gaul. Vindonnus (epithet of Apollo) is linguistically related, and may contribute attributes to later figures beginning with Find-, Finn-. See Gwyn ap Nudd and Fionn mac Cumhaill for further discussion.
? *Windo-seibaris	–	OIr. Findabair	MW Gwenhwyfar	A compound of windo- ('white') attached to a feminine form of *seibaris ('demon, spectre').	Like Gwenhwyfar, Findabair causes the deaths of many heroes in the Táin Bó Cuailnge. Their characters may share a common origin, either from a Common Celtic motif or as the result of later inter-Celtic borrowings. The original meaning was 'white spectre'. See Guinevere for further discussion.
Note: Gaul. = Gaulish; Gall. = Gallaecian; Galat. = Galatian; Lep. = Lepontic; CIb. = Celtiberian; Gal. = Galatian; OIr. = Old Irish; MIr. = Middle Irish; OBritt. = Old Brittonic; OW = Old Welsh; MW = Middle Welsh; Pict. = Pictish; OBret. = Old Breton; MBret. = Middle Breton; OCo. = Old Cornish

=== Entities ===
Proto-Celtic reconstruction	Meaning	Ancient	Goidelic	Brittonic	Etymology	Notes
*abankos	'small (aquatic) creature'	–	Mlr. abacc	MW afanc, MBret. avank	Probably from PCelt. *abon- ('river'), itself from PIE *h_{2}ep- ('water').	Denoting small creatures, presumably from the waters (Mlr. abacc means 'dwarf', MW afanc 'dwarf, beaver', and MBret. avank 'dwarf, sea monster'). Also used as an equivalent to luchorpán (> leprechaun) in Irish.
*branos	'raven'	Gaul. brano-	OIr. bran	MW bran, OBret. -bran, Co. bran	Unclear etymology. Perhaps related to Lith. varna 'raven' (< *worno-), or a loanword from an unknown source.	In Celtic traditions, the crow carries strong martial and supernatural associations, particularly with battlefields and fallen warriors. In Irish mythology, the war goddess Bodb frequently appears in crow form. The probable existence of a similar deity in Brittonic tradition may explain the feminisation of brân as a common noun in Welsh. See also Brân the Blessed.
*deiwos	'deity'	Gaul. deuo-, CIb. teuio-	OIr. día	OW duiu, MBret. doe, OCo. duy	From PIE *deywos ('god, deity').	See Dyēus for further discussion.
*drougos	'phantom, ghost'	–	OIr. airdrech	–	Identical to PGerm. *draugaz (cf. ON draugr 'ghost').	OIr. airdrech ('sprite, phantom') derives from *fari-drougo-. Perhaps a unique Celto-Germanic secondary meaning from the PIE word reflected in Avestan draoγa- ('lie').
*dusyos~ *dwosyos	'incubus, daemon'	Gaul. dusios	–	Bret. Diz, Co. Dus	Cognate with Lith. dvasià ('breath, spirit, soul') and MHG getwās ('spirit, ghost').	The Gaulish word is attested late by Christian authors, denoting an incubus demon (one that sexually abuses women), probably originally a kind of faun. Likely reflected in Bret. Diz ('devil') and Co. Dus. Source of Romansch dischöl ('a kind of malevolent goblin'), Wallon dûhon, and Basque tusuri ('devil').
*goistos	? 'supernatural spirit'	–	OIr. gáes	–	Identical to PGerm. *gaistaz ('supernatural spirit') < Pre-Ger. *ghoistoz.	The original meaning in Celtic is unclear. OIr. gáes means 'sagacity, intelligence, acuteness'.
*morā	'female demon'	–	MIr. mor-	–	From PIE *moreh_{2} ('nightly spirit, bad dream').	OIr. mor-rígain ('queen of bad dreams') is a war-goddess and female malicious entity. The motif appears to be shared with Germanic *marōn (a malevolent female spirit associated with bad dreams) and Slavic *morà ('nightly spirit, bad dream'; e.g. kikimora). See Mare (folklore) and The Morrígan for further discussion.
*seibaris	'demon, spectre'	–	OIr. síabair, síabar	MW -hwyfar	Unclear etymology.	The name was probably inherited from the pagan Celtic mythology. Cf. also OIr. soeb ('crooked, misleading, false'), possibly from PCelt. *soybo-, with the o-grade in the root.
*skāχslo-	'demon, supernatural being'	–	OIr. scál	MW yscwal	Perhaps related to *skek- ('move, stir'). Cognate to Gothic skōhsl ('demon, evil spirit') < *skōhslą.	OIr. scál ('supernatural or superhuman being, phantom, giant, hero; the god Lug'), MW yscaul ('hero, champion, warrior') and Goth. skōhsl ('evil spirit, demon') point to a shared term in Proto-Celtic and Proto-Germanic.
Note: Gaul. = Gaulish; Gall. = Gallaecian; Lep. = Lepontic; CIb. = Celtiberian; Gal. = Galatian; OIr. = Old Irish; MIr. = Middle Irish; OBritt. = Old Brittonic; OW = Old Welsh; MW = Middle Welsh; Pict. = Pictish; OBret. = Old Breton; MBret. = Middle Breton; OCo. = Old Cornish

=== Locations ===
Proto-Celtic reconstruction	Meaning	Ancient	Goidelic	Brittonic	Etymology	Notes
*albiyos	'upper world'	Gaul. albio-	–	OW elbid	From PIE *h_{2}elb^{h}- ('white').	The primary meaning is 'upper world' (< 'luminous world'), in opposition to the underworld. OW elbid underwent a semantic shift to simply signify 'world'.
*ande-dubnos	'other world, world of the dead'	Gaul. antumnos	–	MW annw(f)n	From PCelt. ande- ('below') attached to *dubnos.	While Continental, Irish, and Brittonic sources broadly converge in depicting supernatural realms associated with the dead, the gods, and liminal access points, it remains unclear whether these form a distinctively Celtic complex or reflect motifs shared more widely across European traditions. See also Gaul. anderon, genetive plural of *anderos, interpreted as meaning 'infernal' (perhaps 'gods of the underworld') and cognate with Lat. īnferus and Skt ádhara-. See Annwn for further discussion.
*bitus	'world (of the living)'	Gaul. bitu-	OIr. bith	OW bid, OBret. bit, OCo. bit	From PIE *gwiH-tus ('life').	According to the vertical cosmology of the three worlds, bitu- likely designates the intermediate world of humans and living beings, situated at the center of an axis between the albio- (sky) and the dubno- (underworld). See Bituitus and Bith.
*dubnos	'lower world'	Gaul. dumno-	OIr. domun	MW dwfn, MBret. doun, Co. down	From PIE *d^{h}ewb^{(h)}- ('deep').	This word is at the origin of OIr. domain ('deep') and domun ('world'), and underlies MW Annwfn ('Otherworld, lower world'). See Dumnonii and Damnonii (tribes), Dumnonia (kingdom) and Fir Domnann.
Note: Gaul. = Gaulish; Gall. = Gallaecian; Lep. = Lepontic; CIb. = Celtiberian; Gal. = Galatian; OIr. = Old Irish; MIr. = Middle Irish; OBritt. = Old Brittonic; OW = Old Welsh; MW = Middle Welsh; Pict. = Pictish; OBret. = Old Breton; MBret. = Middle Breton; OCo. = Old Cornish

=== Other ===
Proto-Celtic reconstruction	Meaning	Ancient	Goidelic	Brittonic	Etymology	Notes
*adbertā	'offering, victim'	–	OIr. edbart	OW aperth	From PCelt. *ad- ('to') attached to *ber-tā < *ber-eti ('carry, bring, bear').	The OIr. word is the verbal noun of ad-opair < *ad-uss-bereti ('sacrifices, offers').
*adgaryos	'summoner' (? of the deities)	Gaul. adgarios	OIr. accrae	–	From PCelt. *ad- ('to') attached to *gar-yos ('call, cry').	See also OIr. ad-gair ('summon, subpoena') < *ad-gar(i)et. The OIr. accrae ('complaint') <*ad-garyom is also only used in legal contexts, although the original PCelt. meaning may have been 'to summon the deities [as witnesses]' (cf. OIr. deogaire 'seer' < *deiwo-garyos 'who summons the deity').
*anaman	'soul'	–	OIr. anim	MBret. eneff, anaffoun, Co. enef	From PIE *h_{2}enh_{1}-mn̥ ('breath').	The Insular Celtic forms were influenced by the Lat. cognate anima. See also anaon ('souls of the dead' in Breton mythology).
*anatyom	'soul'	Gaul. anatia pl	–	MW enaid	From PIE *h_{2}enh_{1}-t-yos.	Gaulish anatia is interpreted as meaning 'the souls' (cf. Welsh enaid 'soul'). The Brythonic personal name Anate-mori is identical to MW eneitfawr ('[having] a great soul'). OIr. anál, OW anadyl, MBret. alazn, Co. anal ('breath') come from *anatlā.
*awe-	'poetic inspiration'	–	OIr. aui	MW awen	Related to PCelt. *awelā ('breeze, wind'), itself from PIE *h_{2}uh_{1}-el- (id.).	The PCelt. reconstruction is difficult because the OIr. and MW forms do not agree. The etymological sense is a 'breathing in' of a gift or genius bestowed by a supernatural source. MoBret. awen ('inspiration') is a loanword from Welsh.
*bardos	'bard, poet'	Gaul. bardo-	MIr. bard	MW bardd, MBret. barz, OCo. barth	From PIE *gʷrH-dʰh₁-o-s ('praise-maker').	See Bard for further discussion
*belyom	"tree"	Gaul. Bilius, Biliomagos, Bilicatus, Corobilium	OIr. bile	–	From a e-grade equivalent of PIE *bʰolh₃yom from PIE *bleh₃- ('bloom, flower').	OIr. bile referred to ancient, sacred trees specifically and later became a term for a type of distinguished, holy person.
*brixtus	'magical formula, incantation'	Gaul. brixta	OIr. bricht	MW -brith, OBret. brith	Perhaps from PIE *b^{h}erg̍^{h}- ('enlighten'), or related to PCelt. *berxto- ('bright, beautiful').	See Brixta for further discussion.
*dawnā	'poem'	–	MIr. dúan	–	From PIE *dh_{2}p-no- ('offering').	See Aois-dàna, 'people of the arts; poet'.
*dedmis	'rite, ceremony'	–	OIr. deidmea	MW deddf, MW deuawt, OBret. domot	From PIE *d^{h}e-d^{h}h_{1}-m-is ('custom').	The reconstruction of the vowel in PCelt. *dedmV- is difficult: OBret. domot points to *dedmātos, while OIr. deidmea & MW deddf points to *dedmis.
*druwits	'priest, druid'	Gaul. druides pl	OIr. druí	MW dryw	Presumably meaning 'oak-knower', from PIE *dru- ('oak') attached to *weyd- ('see, know').	The Brittonic forms MW derwydd ('seer') and OBret. dorguid ('prophetic, magical') are parallel formations from *daru-wid- (based on Celtic *daru- 'oak tree') or from *do-are-wid- ('who sees beyond'). OIr. druí and MW dryw could also denote the wren, which, like the raven, was regarded as a prophetic bird in those traditions. See Druid for further discussion.
*ferissā	'religion, belief'	Gaul. *erissios > ersea	OIr. iress	–	Probably from PIE *peri-dh_{1}-teh_{2}.	
*frato-	'good fortune, grace'	Gaul. rato-	OIr. rath	OW rat, OBret. rad-, Co. ras	Probably related to PCel. far-na- ('bestow').	
*kʷritus	'magical transformation, shape'	Gaul. prittus	OIr. cruth	MW pryd, MBret. pred, OCo. prit	From PIE *k^{w}er- ('make, cause').	See Britain, Prydain and tribe Cruthin.
*kʷritiyos	'poet'	Gaul. pritios	OIr. Crithe	MW prydydd, OCo. pridit	An -iyos agent derivate of *kʷritus.	
*karnom	'ancient stone, funerary monument'	Gal. karnon, Gaul. *Karnākon	OIr. carn	OW carn	Probably borrowed from the same non-Indo-European source as PGmc *har(u)gaz.	Cf. also Carnac < Gaul. *Karnākon ('place with pagan stone monuments'). See cairn for further discussion.
*kailo-	'omen'	Gaul. caelo-, CIb. caeilo-	OIr. -chél	OW coil(i)ou, OBret. coel, OCo. chuillioc	From PIE *keh_{2}ilo- ('whole, wealthy').	Source of PCelt. *dus-kailo- (bad omen'; cf. Gaul. dus-celi-, OIr. do-chél) and *su-kailo- ('good omen'; cf. Gaul. su-caelo, MW hy-goel). OIr. cél is a loanword from Brythonic.
*kentu-samonyo-	'May'	–	OIr. cétamain	MW kintevin	A compound of *kentu ('first') and *samon- ('summer').	Meaning 'first summer'.
*krāb-	'devotion, religious practice'	–	OIr. crábud	MW crefydd	Unclear etymology.	MW crefydd is built on a yo-suffix and OIr. crábud on an itu-suffix.
*kreddīti	'believe'	–	OIr. creitid	MW credu, MBret. crediff, OCo. cresy	From PIE *ḱred-d^{h}eh_{1}- ('believe, trust').	The geminate must be recent since PIE *dd would have yielded PCelt. *ss.
*kreddīmā	'faith, believing'	–	OIr. cretem	MBret. critim	Verbal noun of *kreddīti.	
*kredro/i	'relic, sacred object'	–	OIr. cretair	OW creirriou, MBret. kreir, Co. crêr	Related to *kreddīti ('believe').	
*(f)litu-	'festival, celebration'	Gaul. litu-	OIr. líth	OBret. lit	Unclear etymology.	The absence of cognates in other Indo-European languages makes the exact form of the PCelt. reconstruction (*flitu- or *litu-) uncertain.
*marwo-natus	'funerary poem, eulogy'	–	OIr. marbnad	MW marwnad	A compound of PCelt. *marwos ('dead') and *natus ('poem').	The compound, pertaining to poetic language, can probably be projected back to Proto-Celtic.
*meldos	'lightning, hammer of the thunder-god'	Gaul. Meldos	–	MW Mellt	Cognate with PGmc *meldunjaz and PBalt-Slav. mild-n-.	See Perkwunos
*natus	'poem, song, incantation'	Gaul. nata, nato-	OIr. nath	MW nad	Probably from PIE *(s)neh_{1}-tus ('sew').	The semantic development could be explained in terms of poetic metaphors, whereby a poem is identified with a thread.
*nemetom	'sacred grove, sanctuary'	Gaul. nemēton, CIb. nemeto-	OIr. nemed	OBritt. Nemetona, OW -nivet, OBret. -nimet	A t-stem derived from PIE *némos ('sacrifice'), itself from *nem- ('distribute'), or possibly related to PCelt. *nemos ('heaven').	Related to or borrowed into PGmc *nemedaz ('holy grove'). Greek (némos) and Latin (nemus) share the meaning 'forest, (holy) clearance', which evolved from the PIE sense 'what is distributed, sacrifice' (cf. Skt námas- 'worship, honour', Alb. nëmë 'curse, imprecation'). See Nemeton, goddesses Nemetona and Arnemetia, tribe Nemetes.
*nemos	'heaven, sky'	–	OIr. nem	OW nem, OBret. nem, OCo. nef	From PIE *neb^{h}os ('cloud, cloudy sky').	The irregular *-m- of the Celtic forms is best explained as the result of assimilation (n ...b^{h} > n ...m).
*noibos	'holy'	Gaul. Noibios	OIr. noíb	–	From PIE *noyb^{h}os.	
*rūnā	'secret, magic'	Gaul. Runa, Lep. Runatis (?)	OIr. rún	MW rin, MBret. rin, Co. rin-	Related to PGmc *rūnō ('secret, mystery').	Gaul. Cobrunus (< *com-rūnos 'confident') is probably cognate with MW cyfrin, MBret. queffrin and MIr. comrún ('shared secret, confidence'); Lep. Runatis may be derived from *runo-ātis ('belonging to the secret'). See Runes.
*samoni-	'assembly, (feast of the) first month of the year'	Gaul. Samonios	MIr. Samain	–	From PIE *smHon- ('reunion, assembly').	Name of a month or feast. The original meaning is best explained as 'assembly [of the living and the dead]' (cf. OIr. bech-samain 'bee-swarm'; MIr. samain '[assembly on] the 1st of November'). Links to PCelt. *samon- ('summer') appear to be folk etymologies. See Samhain for further discussion.
*sakros	'consecrated, cursed'	Gaul. sacro-	–	MW hagr, MBret. hagr, Co. hager	From PIE *sh_{2}k-ros ('sacred').	The Brittonic cognates mean 'ugly', i.e. 'cursed' < 'consecrated to infernal, malevolent deities'. The original meaning was probably close to that of Latin sācer, meaning 'consecrated', but also 'worthy to be sacrificed', 'cursed'. Cognate to Latin sacerdos, 'priest'.
*sedo- ~ *sīdos	'tumulus (inhabited by supernatural beings), peace'	Gaul. sedum, sidum	OIr. síd	MW hedd, OBret. hed	From PIE *sed-óm and *sḗd-os ~ *sḗd-esos ('seat').	See sidhe.
*soitos	'magic'	–	–	MW hud, MBret. hud, Co. hus	Probably originally identical to PIE *soito- ('string, rope'), from *seh_{2}i- ('to bind'). Cognate with PGmc *saidaz ('magic, charm') and Lith. saitas ('soothsaying, talisman').	Source of PCelt. *soyto-lo- ('charming, illusory'). The shift in meaning appears to be unique to Germanic, Celtic, and Baltic.
*to-fare-ufo-kaneti	'prophesise'	–	OIr. do-aurchain	MW darogan	From PCelt. to-fare- ('towards'), attached to *ufo- ('under') and *kaneti ('sing').	
*tonketom	'fortune, destiny, good luck'	CIb. Tongeta	OIr. tocad*kaylo-	MW tynghet, MBret. tonquaff	Related to PGer. *þinhan- ('to thrive, prosper') < Pre-Ger *ténk-e-.	
*wātis	'seer, sooth-sayer'	Gaul. uatis	OIr. fáith	–	From PIE *weh_{2}-ti- ('prophet'). Related to PGmc *wōðaz ('possessed, inspired, delirious, raging') > ON Óðr.	Also attested in the Gaulish theonym Uatiounos (< wātio-mnos, 'who prophesies'). See also OIr. fethid ('sees, observes') and OW guetid (< *weteti 'say'), perhaps linked to Indo-European divinatory practice combining observation of nature with poetic expression. Latin vātes is probably a Celtic loanword. See vates for further discussion.
*wātus	'poetic inspiration, prophesy'	Gaul. Uatus, Uatuiae	OIr. fáth	MW gwawd	From PIE *weh_{2}-tus ('prophesy').	The stem is also found in the Celtic theonym from Belgica Vatumar-.
*welīts	'seer'	Gaul. ueleda, uiiliits	OIr. filed	MW gwelet, MBret. guelet	From PIE *wel-eti ('to see').	OIr. filed is the genitive form of filí ('poet, seer'). The ancient Germanic Weleda, the name of a seeress, is most likely a borrowing from Gaulish *ueletā ('seeress'), with regular Germanic sound shift -t- > -d-.
*widlmā	'seeress, sorceress'	Gaul. uidluas	OIr. Fedelm	W gwyddon	From PCelt. *wid- ('to see, to know').	Gaul. uidluas may be a genitive form of *uidlua, in which case it may be derived from *widlmā with lenition (like in anuana < *anman- 'name'). W gwyddon is from *widonos.
*yālo-	'praise, worship'	–	OIr. áil	MW iawl, OBret. iolent	From PIE *(H)yeh_{2}lo- ('zeal').	
Note: Gaul. = Gaulish; Gall. = Gallaecian; Lep. = Lepontic; CIb. = Celtiberian; Gal. = Galatian; OIr. = Old Irish; MIr. = Middle Irish; OBritt. = Old Brittonic; OW = Old Welsh; MW = Middle Welsh; Pict. = Pictish; OBret. = Old Breton; MBret. = Middle Breton; OCo. = Old Cornish

== See also ==
- Ancient Celtic religion
- Celtic Animism
- Celtic mythology
- Proto-Germanic paganism
- Proto-Indo-Iranian paganism
