= Latobius =

Celtic god

Latobius was a sky and mountain Celtic god worshipped by the people of Noricum (modern Austria and Slovenia). During ancient Roman times he was equated with aspects of Jupiter and Mars. Votive inscriptions for Mars Latobius are typically found on mountain tops (e.g., on the highest peak of the Koralpe mountain range, between the Lavant and Mur valleys) and on passes in former Noricum.

== Etymology ==
Xavier Delamarre proposed to derive the theonym Latobios from an earlier *Lātu-biyo- ('Furious Striker'), composed of the root lāto- ('furor, ardour'; cf. OIr. láth, Welsh lawd) attached to *biyo- ('strike'; cf. OIr. fu-bae 'harming').
