= Paleo-Balkan mythology =

Ancient Balkan beliefs

Paleo-Balkan mythology is the group of religious beliefs held by Paleo-Balkan-speaking peoples in ancient times, including Illyrian, Thracian and Dacian mythologies.

== Horseman ==
The horseman was a common Palaeo-Balkan hero. The original Paleo-Balkan word for 'horseman' has been reconstructed as *Me(n)zana-, with the root *me(n)za- 'horse'. It is based on evidence provided by:

- Albanian: mëz or mâz 'foal', with the original meaning of 'horse' that underwent a later semantic shift 'horse' > 'foal' after the loan from Latin caballus into Albanian kalë 'horse'; the same root is also found in Albanian: mazrek 'horse breeder';
- Messapic: menzanas, appearing as an epithet in Zis Menzanas, found in votive inscriptions, and in Iuppiter Menzanas, mentioned in a passage written by Festus in relation to a Messapian horse sacrifice;
- Romanian: mînz;
- Thracian: ΜΕΖΗΝΑ̣Ι mezēnai, found in the inscription of the Duvanli gold ring also bearing the image of a horseman.

The reliefs of the Thracian horseman, especially his depiction as a hunter (either chasing or holding the hunted animal in his hand), were widespread within the Balkano-Danubian area during the Roman period.

== Subsets of Paleo-Balkan mythology ==
- Illyrian religion
  - Albanian folk beliefs
- Thracian religion

== See also ==
- Zalmoxianism

== Sources ==
=== Bibliography ===
- Hampartumian, Nubar (1979). Moesia Inferior (Romanian Section) and Dacia. Corpus Cultus Equitis Thracii (CCET). Vol. 4. Brill. ISBN 978-90-04-29552-0.
- Leeming, David A. (2005). The Oxford Companion to World Mythology. Oxford University Press. ISBN 0195156692.
- Oreshko, Rostislav (2020). "The onager kings of Anatolia: Hartapus, Gordis, Muška and the steppe strand in early Phrygian culture" (PDF). Kadmos. 59 (1/2). De Gruyter: 77–128. doi:10.1515/kadmos-2020-0005. S2CID 235451836.
- Wilkes, John J. (1992). The Illyrians. Oxford, United Kingdom: Blackwell Publishing. ISBN 0-631-19807-5.
