= Gradistë belt-plate =

Ancient bronze object found in Albania

- Year: c. 280 BC
- Type: bronze
- Location: Historical Museum of Tirana; Tirana

The Gradistë belt-plate is an Illyrian silvered bronze belt-plate found in the village of Gradistë in south-eastern Albania near Lake Ohrid. The decorative belt-plate dates from the early 3rd century BC around the year 280 BC. It depicts Illyrian warriors in combat both on foot and on horseback with a giant snake-dragon on the left and an unknown dead character with a face mask. The belt-plate shows the typical southern Illyrian shield used in southern Illyria and the Illyrian helmet. The snake in the side symbolizes the religious role it played in the religion of the Illyrians According to several archaeologists the shields depicted in the Gradistë artifact indicate a widespread use of that particular shield type among Illyrians and Ancient Macedonians.
