= Marjeta Šašel Kos =

Slovene archaeologist and philologist

Marjeta Šašel Kos (born 20 April 1954) is a Slovene archaeologist and classical philologist.

== Biography ==
Marjeta Šašel Kos was born on 20 April 1954. In 1980, she earned a master's degree in archaeology from the University of Ljubljana, and in 1989 a PhD in classical philology from the same university.

Since 1987, she has worked as a researcher at the Institute of Archaeology of the Research Centre of the Slovenian Academy of Sciences and Arts (ZRC SAZU).

== Works ==
- Zgodovinska podoba prostora med Akvilejo, Jadranom in Sirmijem pri Kasiju Dionu in Herodijanu. A Historical Outline of the Region between Aquileia, the Adriatic, and Sirmium in Cassius Dio and Herodian. Ljubljana: Slovene Academy of Sciences and Arts. 1986.
- The Roman inscriptions in the National Museum of Slovenia. Narodni Muzej Slovenije. 1997. ISBN 961-6169-07-6.
- Pre-Roman Divinities of the Eastern Alps and Adriatic. Narodni Muzej Slovenije. 1999. ISBN 978-961-6169-11-0.
- Appian and Illyricum. Narodni Muzej Slovenije. 2005. ISBN 978-961-6169-36-3.
