= List of thunder deities =

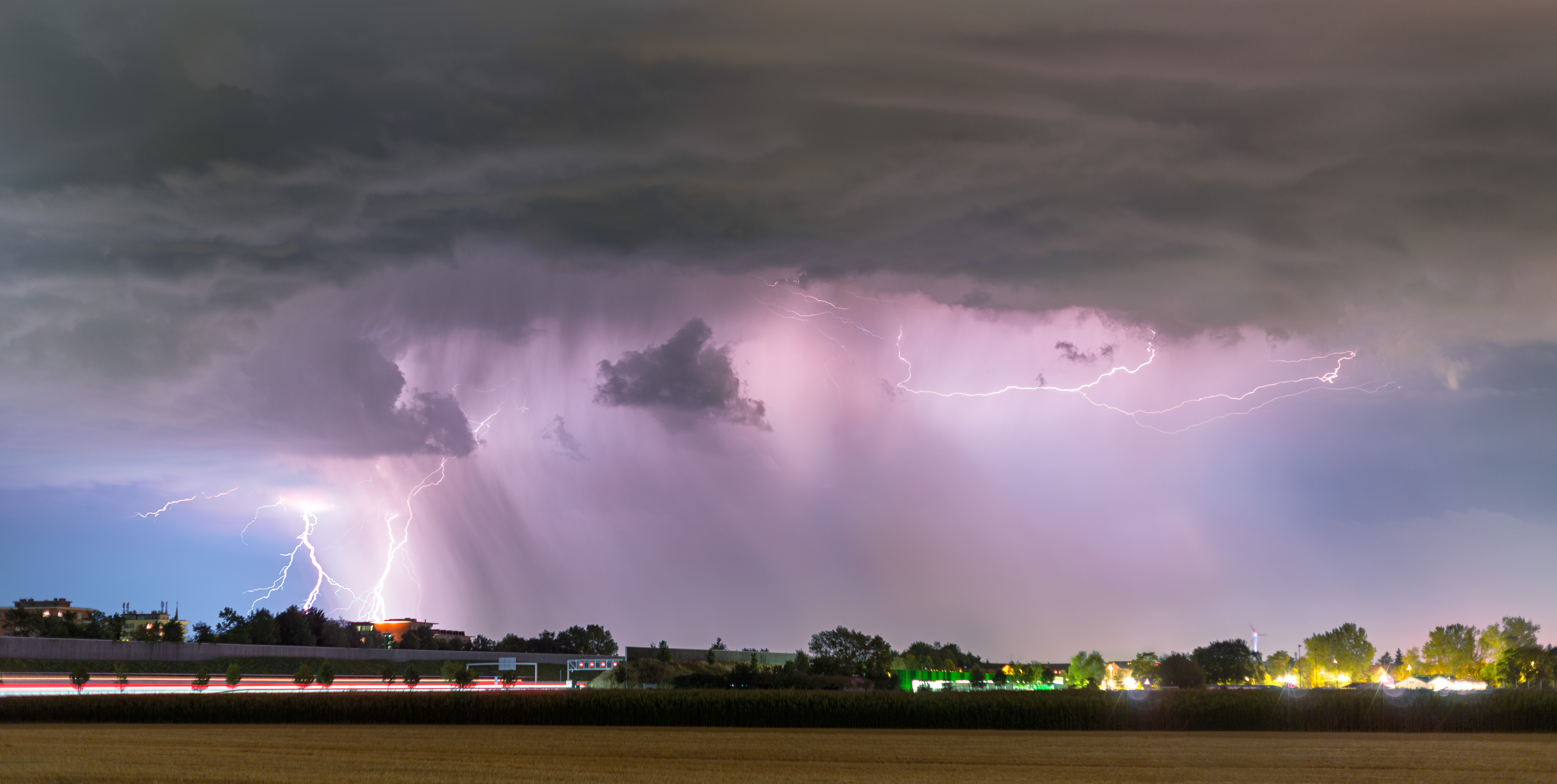
Thunderstorms are commonly depicted as the rage of the deity which is associated with it.

Polytheistic peoples from many cultures have postulated a thunder deity, the creator or personification of the forces of thunder and lightning; a lightning god does not have a typical depiction and will vary based on the culture.

In Indo-European cultures, the thunder god is frequently depicted as male and known as the chief or King of the Gods, e.g.: Indra in Hinduism, Zeus in Greek mythology, Zojz in Albanian mythology, Perkūnas in Baltic mythology and Perun in Slavic mythology.

== Mediterranean ==
- Adad, Bel, Ishkur, Marduk (Babylonian-Assyrian mythology)
- Baʿal, Hadad (Canaanite and Phoenician mythology)
- I Verbti (Albanian mythology)
- Novensiles (Etruscan mythology)
- Perëndi (Albanian mythology)
- Set (Egyptian mythology)
- Shurdh (Albanian mythology)
- Śuri (Etruscan mythology)
- Tarḫunna (Hittite mythology)
- Tarḫunz (Luwian mythology)
- Teshub (Hurrian mythology)
- Vahagn (Armenian mythology)
- Zibelthiurdos (Thracian mythology)
- Zis (Messapian mythology)
- Zojz (Albanian mythology)

=== Greco-Roman ===
- Astrape and Bronte (Greek mythology)
- Fulgora (Roman mythology)
- Jupiter, Summanus (Roman mythology)
- Poseidon (Greek mythology)
- Tempestas (Roman mythology)
- Zeus (Greek mythology)

== Northwestern Eurasia ==
- Ambisagrus, Loucetios (Gaulish mythology)
- Armazi (Georgian mythology)
- Afi (Abkhaz mythology)
- Atämshkai (Moksha mythology)
- Gebeleizis (Dacian mythology)
- Horagalles (Sami mythology)
- Orko (Basque mythology)
- Perëndi (Albanian mythology)
- Perkūnas (Baltic mythology)
- Perkwunos (Proto-Indo-European mythology)
- Perun (Slavic mythology)
- Pikne or Pikker (Estonian mythology)
- Sugaar (Basque mythology)
- Taranis (Pan-Celtic)
- Tharapita or Taara (Estonian mythology)
- Thor/Thunor/Thuner/Thunar/Donar (Germanic/Norse mythology)
- Uacilla (Ossetian mythology)
- Ukko (Finnish mythology)

== Africa ==
- Shango (god of thunder and lightning, Yoruba Nigeria)
- Oya (goddess of hurricanes, storms, death and rebirth, consort of Shango in Yoruba religion)
- Set (Egyptian mythology)
- Nzazi (god of thunder and lightning; master of thunder dogs in Kongo mythology)
- Azaka-Tonnerre (West African Vodun/Haitian Vodou)
- Mulungu
- Xɛvioso (alternately: Xewioso, Heviosso. Thunder god of the So region. Dahomey mythology)
- Amadioha (Igbo, Nigeria)
- Obuma (god of thunder, Ibibio-Efik Mythology, Nigeria)
- Kiwanuka (god of thunder and lightning, Buganda, Uganda)
- Umvelinqangi (god of thunder, earthquakes, sun and sky in Zulu mythology)
- Ta Kora (God of War and Strife in the Akom religion, as well as God of Thunder and lightning in the Northern Akan peoples' sect of Akom, such as the Asante)

== Asia ==
=== South Asia ===
- Indra (Vedic, Hindu mythology and Buddhist mythology)
- Parjanya (Vedic and Hindu mythology)
- Raja Indainda (Batak mythology)
- Vajrapani (Buddhist mythology)

=== East Asia ===
==== Chinese ====
- Dianmu (Chinese: 電母)
- Leigong (Chinese: 雷公)
- Feng Lung (Lei Gong, Lord of Thunder)
- Kui (Chinese: 夔)
- Thirty-six marshals of the Thunder Department.

==== Japanese ====
- Ajisukitakahikone (Japanese: アヂスキタカヒコネ)
- Raijin (Japanese: 雷神)
- Raitaro (Japanese: 雷太郎)
- Tenman Daijizai Tenjin (Japanese: 天満大自在天神)
- Susanoo (Japanese: スサノオ)
- Yakusanoikazuchi (Japanese: 八雷神)
- Takemikazuchi (Japanese: 建御雷/武甕槌)

=== Southeast Asia ===
==== Filipino ====
- Kidul (Kalinga mythology)
- Ovug (Ifugao mythology)
- Aninitud angachar (Ifugao mythology)
- Child of Kabunian (Ibaloi mythology)
- Kidu (Bugkalot mythology)
- Revenador (Ilocano mythology)
- Bathala (Tagalog mythology)
- Kidlat (Tagalog mythology)
- Gugurang (Bicolano mythology)
- Linti (Bicolano mythology)
- Dalodog (Bicolano mythology)
- Kaptan (Bisaya mythology)
- Linting Habughabug (Capiznon mythology)
- Ribung Linti (Suludnon mythology)
- Upu Kuyaw (Pala'wan mythology)
- God of Animals (Surigaonon mythology)
- Diwata Magbabaya/Bathala (Subanon mythology)
- Anit/Anitan (Manobo mythology)
- Spirit of Lightning and Thunder (Teduray mythology)

== Oceania ==
- Haikili (Polynesian mythology)
- Kaha'i (Polynesian mythology)
- Nan Sapwe (Pohnpeian mythology)

=== Australia ===
- Mamaragan (Australian Aboriginal (Kunwinjku) mythology)

=== New Zealand ===
- Tāwhaki (Māori mythology)
- Tāwhirimātea (Māori mythology)
- Te Uira (Māori mythology)
- Whaitiri (Māori mythology)

== Americas ==
- Thunderbird (Haudenosaunee and Wendat mythology)
- Hé-no (Haudenosaunee and Seneca mythology)
- Aktzin (Totonac mythology)
- Wakíŋyaŋ (Sioux/Lakota mythology)
- Xolotl and Tlaloc (Aztec mythology)
- Cocijo (Zapotec mythology)
- Chaac (Maya mythology)
- Yopaat (Maya mythology)
- Chibchacum (Muisca mythology)
- Apocatequil (Inca mythology)
- Illapa (Inca mythology)
- Tunupa (Aymara mythology)
- Tupã (Guarani mythology)
- Kasogonagá (Toba mythology)

== In literature ==
The Hindu God Indra was the chief deity and at his prime during the Vedic period, where he was considered to be the supreme God. Indra was initially recorded in the Rigveda, the first of the religious scriptures that comprise the Vedas. Indra continued to play a prominent role throughout the evolution of Hinduism and played a pivotal role in the two Sanskrit epics that comprise the Itihasas, appearing in both the Ramayana and Mahabharata. Although the importance of Indra has since been subsided in favor of other Gods in contemporary Hinduism, he is still venerated and worshipped.

In Greek mythology, the Elysian Fields, or the Elysian Plains, was the final resting places of the souls of the heroic and the virtuous, evolved from a designation of a place or person struck by lightning, enelysion, enelysios. This could be a reference to Zeus, the god of lightning, so "lightning-struck" could be saying that the person was blessed (struck) by Zeus (/lightning/fortune). Egyptologist Jan Assmann has also suggested that Greek Elysion may have instead been derived from the Egyptian term ialu (older iaru), meaning "reeds," with specific reference to the "Reed fields" (Egyptian: sekhet iaru / ialu), a paradisiacal land of plenty where the dead hoped to spend eternity.

== See also ==
- Nature worship
- Lightning in religion
- Sky deity
  - Sky father
- Storm god
- Leishen (Chinese: "Thunder God")
- Raijin (Japanese: "Thunder God")
- Thunderbolt
- Donar's Oak
- Catatumbo lightning
