= Ljubi =

The lubia or ljubi is a water and storm demon in Albanian mythology and folklore, usually depicted as a huge multi-headed female serpentine dragon similar to the kulshedra. In Southern Albanian beliefs, she is a storm deity. She is also referred to as ‘mother lubia’.She is known for her disturbingly huge appetite and eerie personality. Both of which characteristics are based on the fierce impression the sea gives you on stormy weather. The native people used hyperbole and made a vile creature out of the bad weather conditions.

== Appearance ==
Lubia is depicted as a female demon. She is believed to live in a wonderful vegetable garden. Lubia, as a powerful demon, can cause the waters to dry up unless a virgin is sacrificed to her. Lubia is described as having multiple heads, anywhere from 7-100. Like the Lernaean Hydra, when one of her heads is cut off, another grows in its place. Lubia is also known to have irresistible taste for flesh, especially that of little girls.

== Connection to Greek/Illyrian Mythology ==
Lubia and other dragon creatures from Albanian mythology have similarities to Greek and Illyrian culture, which is thought to have played an influence on the religion. Dragons and serpent-like beings are considered to be a staple of both Greek and Albanian cultures, as noted through the epics of Ovid and the Albanian epic Songs of the Frontier Warriors. Also from Greek Culture, the Lernaean Hydra has a very similar appearance to Lubia. This is due to each's polycephaly. Multiple mythologies possess beings that have multiple heads, although Greek mythology is notable for its abundance.

== Similarities between Ljubi and Kulshedra ==
The Kulshedra and Ljubi are very similar in both appearance and function in Albanian mythology. The Kulshedra is described as "a water, storm, fire and chthonic demon...usually depicted as a huge multi-headed female serpentine dragon". The Kulshedra is also only placated when humans are sacrificed to the being. This matches the description given to Ljubi, and may be another name for it, albeit one with more power and notoriety within Albanian culture.

== See also ==
- Shurdhi
- Verbti
- Kulshedra
- Drangue

== Sources ==
=== Bibliography ===
- Elsie, Robert (2001). A Dictionary of Albanian Religion, Mythology and Folk Culture. London: Hurst & Company. ISBN 1-85065-570-7.
- Lurker, Manfred (2005). The Routledge Dictionary of Gods and Goddesses, Devils and Demons. Routledge, Taylor & Francis. ISBN 0-203-64351-8.
- West, Morris L. (2007). Indo-European Poetry and Myth. Oxford University Press. ISBN 978-0199280759.
