= Zibelthiurdos =

Thracian god of storm and lightning

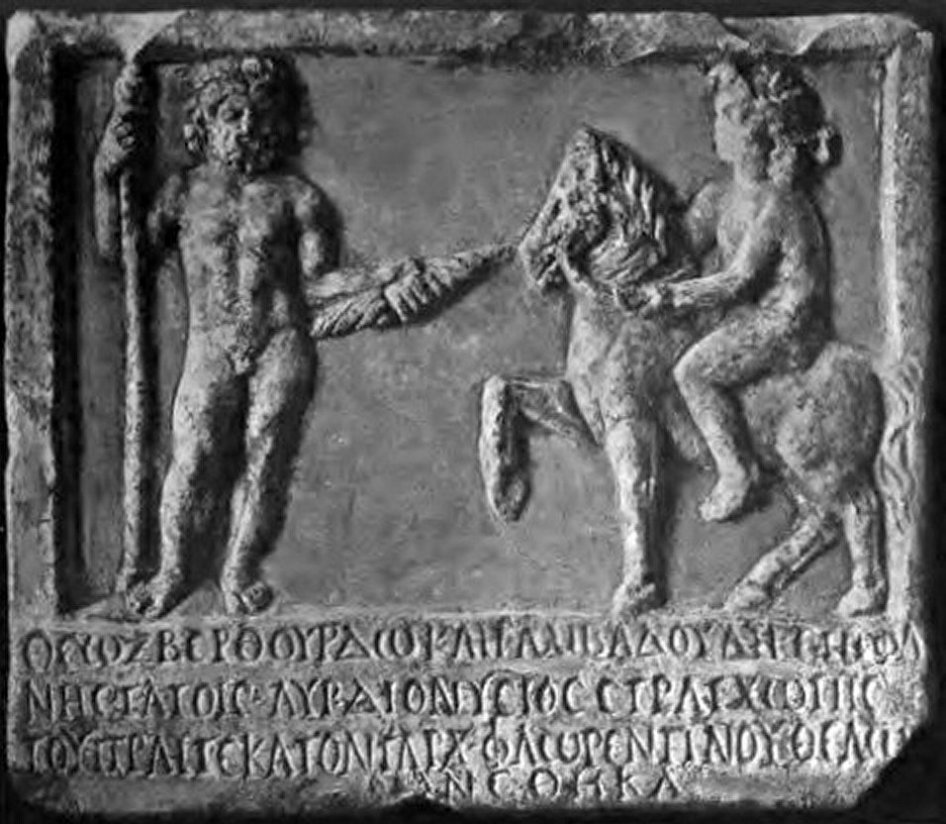
Photo of an epigraphic dedication to Zberthourdos (sic) and Iambadoule.

Zibelthiurdos is a Thracian god of heaven, lightning and rain, whose name is known mainly from epigraphic monuments. The only known reference to this god so far in ancient literature is in Cicero's speech against Pizon, where he is mentioned under the name Jovi Vrii (Iuppiter Urius). According to Cicero, Jupiter Urius had the most ancient and venerated of the barbarian temples, which was sacked by invading armies and resulted in diseases from which those afflicted never recovered.

There is not enough information to draw clear conclusions about his cult, worship, or functions. The preserved images give reason to connect Zibelthiurdos with the ancient Greek God Zeus the Thunderer; he is depicted holding a lightning bolt in his raised right hand, and to his right an eagle with wings spread out. Some scholars consider Thracian Zbelsourdos as an equivalent and partially linguistic cognate of Getic Gebeleizis and Albanian Shurdh, all theonyms used to refer to the Indo-European sky and weather god.

== Names and epigraphy ==
In the epigraphic evidence, the deity's name is attested in 12 documents, alternatively written as Zbelthiourdes, Zbelthourdos, Zbelsourdos or Zbersurdos, Zbeltiurdus, Svelsurdus.

Orientalist Wilhelm Tomaschek reported three Thracian inscriptions:

- a dedication from Moesia made by a Mucaporis to a Διί Ζβελθιούρδῳ;
- an inscription in Skopia to a DEO ZBELTHIURDO;
- an inscription from Perinthus to a Διί Ζιβελσούρδῳ.

According to epigraphic evidence, the name of Greek god Zeus is found in Thracian inscriptions associated with Zbelthiurdos and variations: Zbelturd, Zbelsurd, Zbeltiurd, Zpelturd. This combination is believed to attest a syncretism between the Greek deity and a local Thracian god of thunder and lightning.

== Etymology ==
His name speculatively means "Lightning Carrier" or "Thunderer", but it is uncertain whether Zibelthiurdos is his name or an epithet. Dimitar Detschew supposed that Zbelturdos and variations are epithets of the Thracian reflex of the Proto-Indo-European sky-god *Dyēus.

Tomaschek interpreted that Zibel- and Zbel- were the same word, although he believed the former to be the older form (cf. Thracian king Ζιβέλμιος, or Zibelmios). He also derived Zbel- from a Proto-Indo-European stem *ģʰeib- "light, lightning". Also the Getic theonym Gebeleizis has been explained as a compound of gebele and zis; gebele probably is from the same PIE root *ģʰeib-; zis is a reflex of the PIE day-light-sky god *Dyēus, the same as Messapic Zis (cognate and equivalent of the Greek Zeus). The Thracian theonym Zibelthiurdos or Zbelsurdos appears to contain the same PIE root, but with a different phonetic development – zebele instead of gebele. The second part of the theonym Zbelsurdos, surdos, has been equated with the Albanian theonym Shurdh used in some regions of northern Albania to refer to the weather god, worshiped until the 20th century and presumably preserved since Illyrian times. This term has been interpreted as meaning either "water donor" or "bellow, hum".

In another line of scholarship, Dimitar Detschew assumed that the particles Zber- and Zbel- derived from a Proto-Indo-European stem *ģwer- 'briller, éclairer'. Furthermore, if the second part of the original form of the Thracian theonym was thiurdos, thurdos, etc. instead of surdos, another etymology has been proposed: derived from a stem *twer/*tur 'to have', while *dho would indicate a nomen agentis suffix. In this view Zbelthiurdos would mean 'he who has the lightning'.

=== Related words ===
Per Tomaschek, further descendants of *ģʰeib- would include Lithuanian žaibas "lightning", verb žibėti "to shine, to glow", and possibly Croatian zúblja "torch" and Slovene zubelj "flame". In the same vein, Bulgarian linguist Vladimir I. Georgiev proposed a connection to Lithuanian Žiburys 'light, torch'.

Bulgarian linguist Ivan Duridanov indicated the word Zbel- is related to Latvian zibele "lightning".

== Cultic locales ==
Zibelthiurdos shrines have been found near the village of Golemo Selo in the Kyustendil Region – an area inhabited by the Thracian Dentellets tribe – as well as near Kapitan Dimitrievo village in the Pazardzhik Province. His image was discovered in a relief from the Esquiline Hill, where he is depicted along with Yambadula (or Iambadoule), a figure of an unclear nature.

At least three inscriptions to deity Zbeltiurdus were found in the ancient Dardanian territory: one in Kaçanik, another in Ljubanac (near Skopje), and the third in Dovezenac, near Kumanovë.

== Other uses ==
The Zbelsurd Glacier of Antarctica is named after the god.

== See also ==
- Gebeleizis
- Shurdhi

== Bibliography ==
- Cicero. "Latin Texts and Translations". In Pisonem. University of Chicago. Archived from the original on 24 December 2018.
- Duridanov, Ivan (1985). Die Sprache der Thraker [The language of the Thracians]. Bulgarische Sammlung (in German). Vol. 5. Hieronymus Verlag. p. 69. ISBN 3-88893-031-6.
- Eliade, Mircea (1970). De Zalmoxis à Gengis-Khan: études comparatives sur les religions et le folklore de la Dacie et de l'Europe orientale. Payot.
- Elsie, Robert (January 2001). A Dictionary of Albanian Religion, Mythology and Folk Culture. C. Hurst & Co. Publishers. ISBN 978-1-85065-570-1.
- Kovachev, Georgi (1997). "Ancient Cults in the Sliven Area in the 2nd - 3rd Century". Bulgarian Historical Review. 4: 111–133 – via Central and Eastern European Online Library.
- Lurker, Manfred (2004). The Routledge dictionary of gods and goddesses, devils and demons. Psychology Press. ISBN 978-0-415-34018-2.
- Popov, Dimitar (2009). "Le Dieu Supreme des Thraces. Incarnations et Identifications, Traductions - Notations et Noms - Appellations" [The Supreme God of the Thracians. Embodiments and Identifications, Translations – Notations and Names – Appellations]. Thracia (in French). 18: 15–33 – via Central and Eastern European Online Library.
- Puhvel, Jaan (1957). "Reviewed Work: Die thrakischen Sprachreste by Dimiter Detschew". Language. 33 (3): 446. doi:10.2307/411167. JSTOR 411167.
- Tomaschek, Wilhelm (1893a). Die Alten Thraker. Eine ethnologische Untersuchung [The Ancient Thracians. An ethnological study] (in German). Vol. II. Vienna: Tempsky. p. 62 – via Internet Archive.
- Tomaschek, Wilhelm (1893b). Die Alten Thraker. Eine ethnologische Untersuchung [The Ancient Thracians. An ethnological study] (in German). Vol. II. Vienna: Tempsky. p. 60 – via Internet Archive.
- Tomaschek, Wilhelm (1893c). Die Alten Thraker. Eine ethnologische Untersuchung [The Ancient Thracians. An ethnological study] (in German). Vol. II. Vienna: Tempsky. p. 61 – via Internet Archive.
- Treimer, Karl (1971). "Zur Rückerschliessung der illyrischen Götterwelt und ihre Bedeutung für die südslawische Philologie" [On the re-development of the Illyrian world of gods and their importance for South Slavic philology]. In Barić, Henrik (ed.). Arhiv za Arbanasku starinu, jezik i etnologiju [Archive for Arbanian antiquity, language and ethnology]. Vol. I. R. Trofenik. pp. 27–33.
