= Perëndi =

Albanian word for god, the sky and heaven

Perëndi (Albanian definite form: Perëndia) is an Albanian noun for God, deity, sky and heaven. It is used capitalized to refer to the Supreme Being, and uncapitalized for "deity", "sky" and "heaven".

== Name ==
=== Description ===
In Albanian, Perëndí (definite: Perëndía) is the name of God, the sky and heaven, and is used capitalized to refer to the Supreme Being. The plural indefinite form is perëndí while the plural definite form is perëndítë, used uncapitalized to refer to the deities. Some dialectal alternative forms include: Perendí, Perenní, Perondí, Perundí, Perudí, Perndí and Parandí.

The word perëndi(a) is attested in Old Albanian literature, firstly mentioned by Luca Matranga in the late 16th century and Bishop Pjetër Budi in the early 17th century, included into the text of the Albanian translation of the Pater Noster. However, it never appears in the works of the earliest Albanian author, Gjon Buzuku, who translate Deus always using the noun Zot with the compound Zotynë or Ynëzot (Zot-ynë, ynë-Zot "our Lord/God"), even translating the Latin Dominus Deus with the word Zotynë only. The noun Zotynë / Ynëzot, along with its inflections in the different grammatical cases, was commonly used in the Old Albanian language of the literature in northern Albania as well as in the Albanian colonies in Greece and Italy. Another old noun to refer to the Deity was Hyj, a nonderivative equivalent of Deus that has been characterized as "a half-pagan word" and "a rare stylistic variant" used "poetically" instead of the noun Perëndi(a). However the noun Hyj appears in Old Albanian literature only in the works of Bishop Pjetër Bogdani.

The early meaning of the word perëndi(a) was usually different from the present one, as it does not generally occur in Old Albanian literature used as a name of the Deity. Although Budi reports atinë Perëndi ("father God"), he translates the Latin phrase Regnum tuum as perëndia jote in Albanian. Bishop Frang Bardhi translates Caesar as Perëndi. Bishop Pjetër Bogdani translates from Italian to Albanian l' imperatore di Turchia ("the emperor of Turkey") as Perëndia i Turqisë and quattro Monarchie ("four kingdoms/monarchies") as katër Perëndija. The common usage of perëndi(a) for "Deity" is almost certainly a later phenomenon.

It is a pan-Albanian word. In Myzeqe in central Albania a village is named Perondí, and in Bosnia and Herzegovina it is used in the family name Perèndija. The Albanians of Ukraine use Parandí for "God" and parandítë for "gods". The word perëndi means "heaven, sky" in some Albanian dialects, with both direct and figurative meanings. A typical example is an Albanian popular phrase gruri gjer mbë perëndi ("a pile of grain up to the skies"). As a name of God Perëndi(a) has been recognised by all Albanians already since the 19th century. However it has been mainly used as a feminine noun. It contains the stressed -i, which is the typical suffix of abstract nouns in the Albanian language. Other examples are dijeni(a) ("knowledge"), trimëri(a) ("bravery"), madhëri(a) ("majesty"). Since they belong to the declension type which is characteristic to feminine nouns in Albanian, they are normally of feminine gender. It is difficult to infer whether Albanian speakers and writers relate the noun Perëndi(a) with the concept of a personal God or a half-abstract and impersonal "deity", but in general usage in the Albanian language outside the Bible translations the noun Perëndi tends to be less personal than the noun Zot. (Note: For instance, the Albanian classic writer Naim Frashëri – who was a Bektashi Muslim sharing pantheistic beliefs and widely using the noun Perëndi(a) in his works – referred to God as the personal Creator of the universe with Zot i madh e i vërtetë "great and true Lord/God".)

=== Etymology ===
The origin of the Albanian noun Perëndi is obscure. Several etymologies have been proposed by scholars:

- From an Albanian word creation of folk nature derived, by using the suffix -í of the Albanian abstract nouns, from Latin: imperantem, the accusative masculine/feminine singular of imperāns, meaning "commanding", "ruling", "demanding".
- From an Albanian compound of the roots per-en- ("to strike') and -dí ("sky, god"). (Note: The first element belongs to the family of Proto-Indo-European mythological names endowed with regular reflexes of the same root *per-, "to strike", and a suffix -en/n- which has reflexes also in other Indo-European divine names like *peruhₓnos "the one with the thunder stone", or Perun/Perunŭ, the Slavic thunder god, cf. *Perk^{w}unos, the Proto-Indo-European weather-god. The non-enlarged root *per- is found also in the Hittite Peruna- ("deity" and "holy cliff"), in the Pamir Perun (a war-god), cognate with Pashto Pērunē (the name for the Pleiades, cf. Avestan paoiriiaēinī-), and perhaps in Ancient Greek κεραυνός ("thunderbolt") an epithet of Zeus and the name of a separate deity, which might have been a synonymic substitution for the prohibited form *περαυνός. While velar enlargements are found in Lithuanian Perkūnas (which could be the prohibited form of Perūnas), in Old Norse Fjörgynn, in Rigvedic Parjanya (god of storm and rain) and probably in Thracian Perkos/Perkon (Περκων/Περκος), a horseman hero. Terms from the root *pér-ur- and related to stone are also attested in Hitt. pēru ("rock, cliff, boulder"), Aves. pauruuatā ("mountains"), and Skt párvata ("rocky, cliff, mountain"). In the Albanian language, a word to refer to the lightning—considered in folk beliefs as the "fire of the sky"—is shkreptimë, a formation of shkrep meaning "to flash, tone, to strike (till sparks fly off)". An association between strike, stones and fire, can be related to the observation that one can kindle fire by striking stones against each other. The act of producing fire through a strike—reflected also in the belief that fire is residual within the oak trees after the thunder-god strikes them—indicates the potential of lightning in the myth of creation.; The second element dí/día/dei ("day, sky, deity") derives from PIE *Dyēus ("daylight-sky-god"), which is found also in the archaic Albanian divine name of the sky and thunder god Zojz, cognate with Messapian Zis and Greek Zeus. This element is thought to be contained also in another Albanian term for the Supreme Being: Zot, considered to be derived from Proto-Albanian *dźie̅u ̊ a(t)t-, an old compound for "heavenly father", from PIE *dyew- ("sky, heaven, bright") + *átta ("father"), thus a cognate with PIE *Dyḗus ph₂tḗr and with its descendants: Illyrian Dei-pátrous, Sanskrit द्यौष्पितृ (Dyáuṣ Pitṛ́), Proto-Italic *djous patēr (whence Latin Iuppiter), Ancient Greek Ζεῦ πάτερ (Zeû páter).) The Proto-Indo-European theonymic roots *dei- ("to shine") and *perkwu-s ("sky/rain/oak associations") may be grouped together under the classifications of "celestial luminosity". Some scholars consider Perëndi to have been a sky and thunder god in the Albanian pagan mythology, and to have been a deity presumably worshiped by the Illyrians in antiquity. As such, in some of his attributes Perëndi could be related to the Albanian weather and storm gods Shurdh and Verbt, and to the mythological demigod drangue. An Albanian attested sky and lightning god is Zojz, from PIE Dyeus (Daylight-Sky-God).
- From the Albanian verb perëndoj ("to set of the sun"), ultimately derived from Latin parentari, the passive correlate of parentare ("a sacrifice to the dead, to satisfy"). This etymology could relate the word perëndi with the ancient Albanian Sun cult.

== Usage in folk beliefs ==
=== Lightning and thunder-stones ===
In Albanian folk beliefs the lightning was regarded as the "fire of the sky" (zjarri i qiellit) and was considered the "weapon of the deity" (arma/pushka e perëndisë), indeed an Albanian word to refer to the lightning is rrufeja, related to the Thracian rhomphaia, an ancient polearm. Albanians believed in the supreme powers of thunder-stones (kokrra e rrufesë or guri i rejës), which were believed to be formed during lightning strikes and to be fallen from the sky. Thunder-stones were preserved in family life as important cult objects. It was believed that bringing them inside the house could bring good fortune, prosperity and progress in people, in livestock and in agriculture, or that rifle bullets would not hit the owners of the thunder-stones. A common practice was to hung a thunder-stone pendant on the body of the cattle or on the pregnant woman for good luck and to contrast the evil eye.

In Albanian culture, the heaviest type of oath swearing (Alb. beja më e rëndë) is taken by a thunder-stone "which comes from the sky" (beja me gur/kokërr reje/rrufeje që vjen nga perëndia). It was a very serious oath and people were afraid of it even though they were telling the truth. The act of absolving himself of any allegation of theft was performed in the following way: the thunder-stone was taken in the left hand and was touched by the right hand saying:

Për këtë kokërr rejet, nuk ta kam vjedhë as unë, as kush i shpisë sime e nuk e di se kush ta ka vjedhë! Në të rrejsha, reja më gjoftë!

Translation:

I swear by this thunder-stone that I have not stolen it, nor anyone of my house and I don't know who stole it! If I lied to you, may cloud strike me!

=== Rainmaking ===
The word perëndi is especially invoked by Albanians in incantations and songs praying for rain. Rituals were performed in times of summer drought to make it rain, usually in June and July, but sometimes also in the spring months when there was severe drought. In different Albanian regions, for rainmaking purpose, people threw water upwards to make it subsequently fall to the ground in the form of rain. This was an imitative type of magic practice with ritual songs.

In Nowruz or in the Albanian Spring Day (Dita e Verës), in particular, in some villages of the region of Kurvelesh in southern Albania people addressed the following prayer to the deity for plants and cattle:

O perëndi, nepna shi në vërri!
Të bëhet misri dhe shelegu me bri!

Translation:

Oh 'sky', give us rain on winter pastures!
So that corn and lambs grow horns!

In rainmaking ritual songs from southwestern Albania, people used to pray to the Sun, invoking the names Dielli, Shën Dëlliu, Ilia or Perëndia. After repeating three times the invocation song, they used to say: Do kemi shi se u nxi Shëndëlliu ("We will have rain because the Holy Sun went dark").

=== Fate deities ===
Among the Albanians of Ukraine there is a belief about the determination of a child's fate by the parandí(të) "gods/deities". (Note: cf. the Albanian mythological figure of destiny and fate, Ora.) The belief is referred in the local Albanian dialect as Parandítë të gjithtë búnë rasredelít meaning "Everything is Assigned by the Gods/Deities".

== See also ==
- Albanian folk beliefs
- Illyrian religion
- En (deity)
- Zojz (deity)
- Prende
- Drangue
