= Lightning in religion =

Religious interpretation of the meteorological phenomenon

The presence of lightning in religion is an historically existing and currently existing cultural aspect where-by the phenomenon of lightning has been or is viewed as part of a deity or a deity in and of itself, or as a component of a religious practice.

== Deities ==
One of the most classic portrayals of this is of the Greek god Zeus. An ancient story recounts when Zeus was at war against Cronus and the Titans, he released his brothers, Hades and Poseidon, along with the Cyclopes. In turn, the Cyclopes gave Zeus the thunderbolt as a weapon. The thunderbolt became a popular symbol of Zeus and continues to be today.

In Slavic mythology the highest god of the pantheon is Perun, the god of thunder and lightning. A Polish name for lightning is piorun, derived from the god's name.

Pērkons/Perkūnas is the common Baltic god of thunder, one of the most important deities in the Baltic pantheon. In both Latvian and Lithuanian mythology, he is documented as the god of thunder, rain, mountains, oak trees and the sky.

In Norse mythology, Thor is the god of thunder and the sound of thunder comes from the chariot he rides across the sky. The lightning comes from his hammer Mjölnir.

In Finnish mythology, Ukko (English. Old Man) is the god of thunder, sky and weather. The Finnish word for thunder is ukkonen, derived from the god's name.

In Judaism, a blessing "...He who does acts of creation" is to be recited, upon sighting lightning. The Talmud refers to the Hebrew word for the sky, ("Shamaim") – as built from fire and water ("Esh Umaim"), since the sky is the source of the inexplicable mixture of "fire" and water that come together, during rainstorms. This is mentioned in various prayers, Psalm 29, and discussed in writings of Kabbalah.

In Christianity, lightning is symbolized and attributed to the divinity and power of God. In the Bible, lightning (and thunder) are used, for example, for the wrath of God (Exodus 9:24; 2. Samuel 22.15; Job 37; Psalm 18), for God's judgment (Zechariah 9.14), for God's revelation to men (Exodus 20:18; Revelation 4:5), for the coming of the Son of Man (Matthew 24:27, Luke 17:24), for the fall of Satan (Luke 10:18) and for the nature of the angels and the risen (Hes 1,14; Daniel 10.6; Matthew 28.3), in the book of Revelation the lightning is often referred to as the final judgment.

In Islam, the Quran states: "He it is Who showeth you the lightning, a fear and a hope, and raiseth the heavy clouds. The thunder hymneth His praise and (so do) the angels for awe of Him. He launcheth the thunder-bolts and smiteth with them whom He will." (Qur'an 13:12–13) and, "Have you not seen how God makes the clouds move gently, then joins them together, then makes them into a stack, and then you see the rain come out of it..." (Quran, 24:43). The preceding verse, after mentioning clouds and rain, speaks about hail and lightning, "...And He sends down hail from mountains (clouds) in the sky, and He strikes with it whomever He wills, and turns it from whomever He wills."

In India, the Hindu god Indra is considered the god of rains and lightning and the king of the Devas.

In Inca mythology, Illapa was the god of lightning, thunder, lightning's flash, rain, weather and war. As a result of his aforementioned powers, Illapa was considered the third most important god within the Inca pantheon. Only surpassed by Wiracocha and Inti. He is represented as an imposing man in brilliant garments of gold and precious stones who lived in the upper world. Likewise, Illapa carried a warak'a with which he produced storms and a golden makana, which symbolizes his power and the trinity of lightning, thunder and the flash of lightning. Another representation that the Incas gave to Illapa was that of a warrior formed by stars in the celestial world. His rites took place in the highest mountains, because they believed that Illapa used to live in them. His rites consisted of dances, chants, festivals and animal sacrifices (in periods of great need, human offerings were also made). Illapa manifested himself in the earthly world in the form of a puma or hawk.

In Japan, the Shinto god Raijin is considered the god of lightning and thunder. He is depicted as a demon who strikes a drum to create lightning.

In the traditional religion of the African Bantu tribes, such as the Baganda and Banyoro of Uganda, lightning is a sign of the ire of the gods. The Baganda specifically attribute the lightning phenomenon to the god Kiwanuka, one of the main trio in the Lubaale gods of the sea or lake. Kiwanuka starts wild fires, strikes trees and other high buildings, and a number of shrines are established in the hills, mountains and plains to stay in his favor. Lightning is also known to be invoked upon one's enemies by uttering certain chants, prayers, and making sacrifices.

== Ceraunoscopy ==
Ceraunoscopy is divination by observing lightning or by listening to thunder. It is a type of aeromancy. In particular, the ancient Etruscans produced guides to brontoscopic and fulgural divination of the future based on the omens supposedly displayed by thunder or lightning occurring on particular days of the year or in particular places.
