= Talas (deity) =

Talas (Albanian definite form: Talasi) is a sea-storm god in Albanian mythology and folklore. A mythical tale concerning the god Talas has been documented in the early 20th century from the Shala region in northern Albania.

== Name ==
The Albanian theonym Talas may be of Ancient Greek or Pre-Greek origin (cf. Θάλασσα Thálassa, "sea"). The word talas means "wave" in Albanian, synonymous with valë. The word θάλασσα, with its prenasalized variant δαλάγχαν, is typically Pre-Greek.

== Myth ==
According to a mythical tale from the Shala region, as the wife of the highest god was soaring over the seas to delight in the sight of the order which her husband's wisdom had created, the god Talas noticed her. She was so beautiful that no other goddess could match her. So the god Talas went after the wife of the highest god and as soon as he reached her, he raped her through the use of brute force. Afterwards the wife of the highest god, despite being above all the other goddesses, decided to take her own life due to the desecration she suffered, (Note: Talas had attacked and desecrated her in a shameful manner, so that in future she could no longer be seen among the others. Note that besa and nderi (honour) are of major importance in Albanian customary law as the cornerstone of personal and social conduct.) but only after telling her husband what she had been through. So she stepped before her husband, and immedatelly after reporting what happened, she seized a weapon and stretched herself as a corpse before the highest of the gods. Because of that horrible suicide, but more than that, because of the defilement which his wife had suffered from the god Talas, the highest god swore an oath to take vengeance on the god who did that disgrace to him. After some time the highest god accomplished his revenge by hitting Talas with one of his cruel thunderbolts that tore him to pieces, after which his corpse would have emitted a stormy wind that no one could approach, so his whole body was buried in the ground. The god Talas did not smell like humans, but rather more pleasant. Hence the interpretation that he was the god of the sea-storm or the god of the storm surge.
