= Iambadoule =

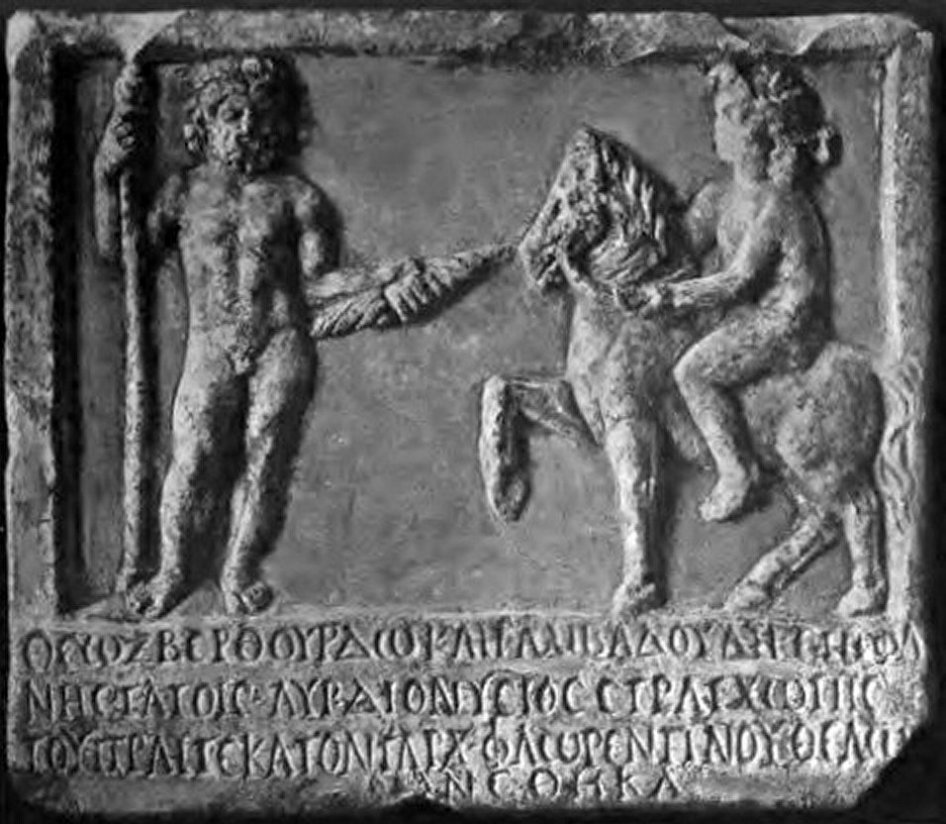
Photo of an epigraphic dedication to Zberthourdos and Iambadoule.

Iambadoule is a Thracian goddess, epigraphically testified together with the Thracian god Zberthourdos (Sbelsurdos).

== Epigraphy ==
The deity is attested in an inscription written in Ancient Greek. A male deity, identified as Zberthourdos, is standing unclothed with a naked woman on a horse by his side.

θεῷ Ζβερθούρδῳ καὶ Ἰαμβαδούλῃ, ἐπιφανηστάτοις, Αὐρ(ήλιος) Διονύσιος, στρατ(ιώτης) χῶρτις τοῦ πραιτ(ωρίου) ἑκατοντάρχ(ου) Φλωρεντίνου, θέλων ἀνέθηκα

Translation:

To God Zberthourdos and Iambadoule, the most prominent, Aurelius Dionysius, a local soldier of the praetorian centurion Florentinus, wished to dedicate.

According to Dimitar Detschew, the form Ἰαμβαδούλῃ appears in the dative, pointing to a nominative Ἰαμβαδούλῃ (Iambadoule) or Ἰαμβαδούλῃς (Iambadoules).

== Etymology ==
French archeologist Paul Perdrizet indicated that the particle "-δουλέ" is also attested in personal name Δουλέ-ζελμις, a Thracian mercenary.

Detschew suggested that the deity's name is an epithet of a Thracian earth-mother goddess, translated as "the one that places the grain", with "iamba" meaning "wheat; wealthy, nutrition", and "doule" from Proto-Indo-European *dhe- 'to place', plus nomen agentis suffix -lo.

Bulgarian linguist Vladimir I. Georgiev proposed that Iambadoules means 'rainstorm, thunderstorm', from Dula 'the storm', with relation to Old Iranian ambhas 'water' and Greek θύελλα (thúella) 'storm'.

== Legacy ==
According to researcher Dragoslav Antonijević, Dragojlovic argued that the South Slavic character of the samovila (a fairy-like figure) is a continuation of this Thracian goddess.
