= Raja Indainda =

In Batak mythology, Raja Indainda is a god of thunder, as well as a spy and messenger of the other gods. He may be the son of Soripada.
