= Zojz (deity) =

Albanian sky and lightning god

Celestial symbols – double-headed eagle and six-pointed star/sun – on the official seal of Skanderbeg, the Lord of Albania (D · AL Dominus Albaniae).

Zojz (Note: The indefinite Albanian forms of the theonym are Zojz or Zojs, the definite forms are Zojzi or Zojsi.) is a name for a sky and lightning god in Albanian pagan mythology. Regarded as the chief god and the highest of all gods, traces of his worship survived in northern Albania until the early 20th century, and in some forms still continue today. The old beliefs in the Sky (Alb. Qielli) are pagan beliefs preserved by Albanians since ancient times. In Albanian the god who rules the sky is referred to as i Bukuri i Qiellit ("the Beauty of the Sky"), a phrase that is used in pagan contexts for the Sun (Dielli), worshiped as the god of light, sky and weather, giver of life, health and energy, and all-seeing eye. The sacred significance of one of the main symbols of the sky cult – the eagle – has been scrupulously preserved by Albanians, who have always considered it their animal totem. An epithet considered to be associated with the sky-god is "father", thought to be contained in the Albanian noun Zot ("Sky Father", from Proto-Albanian: *dźie̅u ̊ a(t)t-), used to refer to the supreme entity. A remarkable reflection of Proto-Indo-European mythology associated with the dawn goddess *H₂éwsōs is the Albanian tradition according to which the dawn goddess – Prende – is the daughter of the sky god – Zojz.

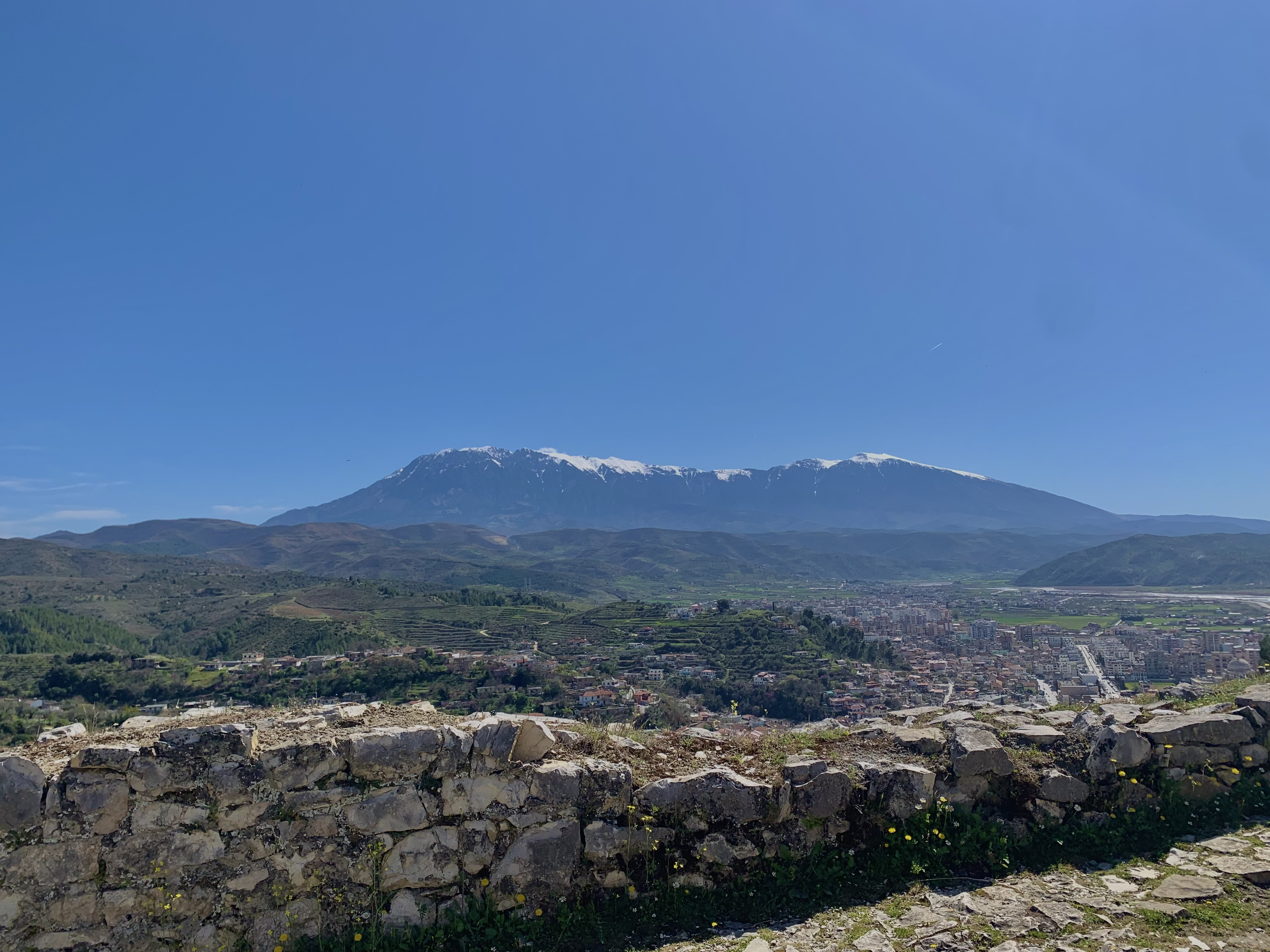
The cult practiced by the Albanians on Mount Tomorr in south-central Albania is considered as a continuation of the ancient Indo-European sky-god worship.

In classical antiquity Zojz was presumably worshiped by Illyrians as the ancestors of the Albanians. Albanian Zojz is the clear equivalent and cognate of Messapic Zis and Ancient Greek Zeus (all from Proto-Indo-European *Di̯ḗu̯s 'sky god'). The Albanian tradition according to which the Sun is an "eye", is a reflection of the Indo-European belief according to which the Sun is the eye of the Sky-God. The Sun, referred to as "the all-seeing (big) eye" is invoked in Albanian solemn oaths (be), and information about everything that happens on Earth is asked to the all-seeing Sun in ritual songs. Albanian folk beliefs regard the lightning as the "fire of the sky" (Zjarri i Qiellit) and consider it as the "weapon of the deity". Finding correspondences with Albanian folk beliefs and practices, the Illyrian Sun-deity, which was the chief cult object of the Illyrians, worshipped in a widespread and complex religious system, is figuratively represented on Iron Age plaques from Lake Shkodra as the god of the sky and lightning, also associated with the fire altar where he throws lightning bolts. Albanian rituals to avert big storms with torrential rains, lightning, and hail, seek assistance from the supernatural power of the Fire (Zjarri, evidently also called with the theonym Enji). Albanian rituals for rainmaking invoke the Sky and the Sun. The cult practiced by the Albanians on several sacred mountains (notably on Mount Tomorr in central Albania) performed with pilgrimages, prayers to the Sun, ritual bonfires, and animal sacrifices, is considered a continuation of the ancient Indo-European sky-god worship. The cult of the Sky is also preserved in Albanian solemn oaths. The Sky (Qielli) is often paired with the Earth (Dheu) in Albanian oath swearings.

The Albanian divine culture hero drangue, who plays a dominant role in Albanian mythology, features the attributes of a sky and lightning deity, apparently an Albanian reflection of the Indo-European sky god. In some Albanian regions the lightning god who lives in the clouds in the sky is alternatively referred to as Shurdhi, Verbti, or Rmoria. Another possible name of the sky and lightning god could be Perëndi. An Albanian mythical tale concerning the highest of the gods, who uses thunderbolts to defeat the sea-storm god Talas, has been documented in the early 20th century from the Shala region in northern Albania.

== Name ==
=== Etymology ===
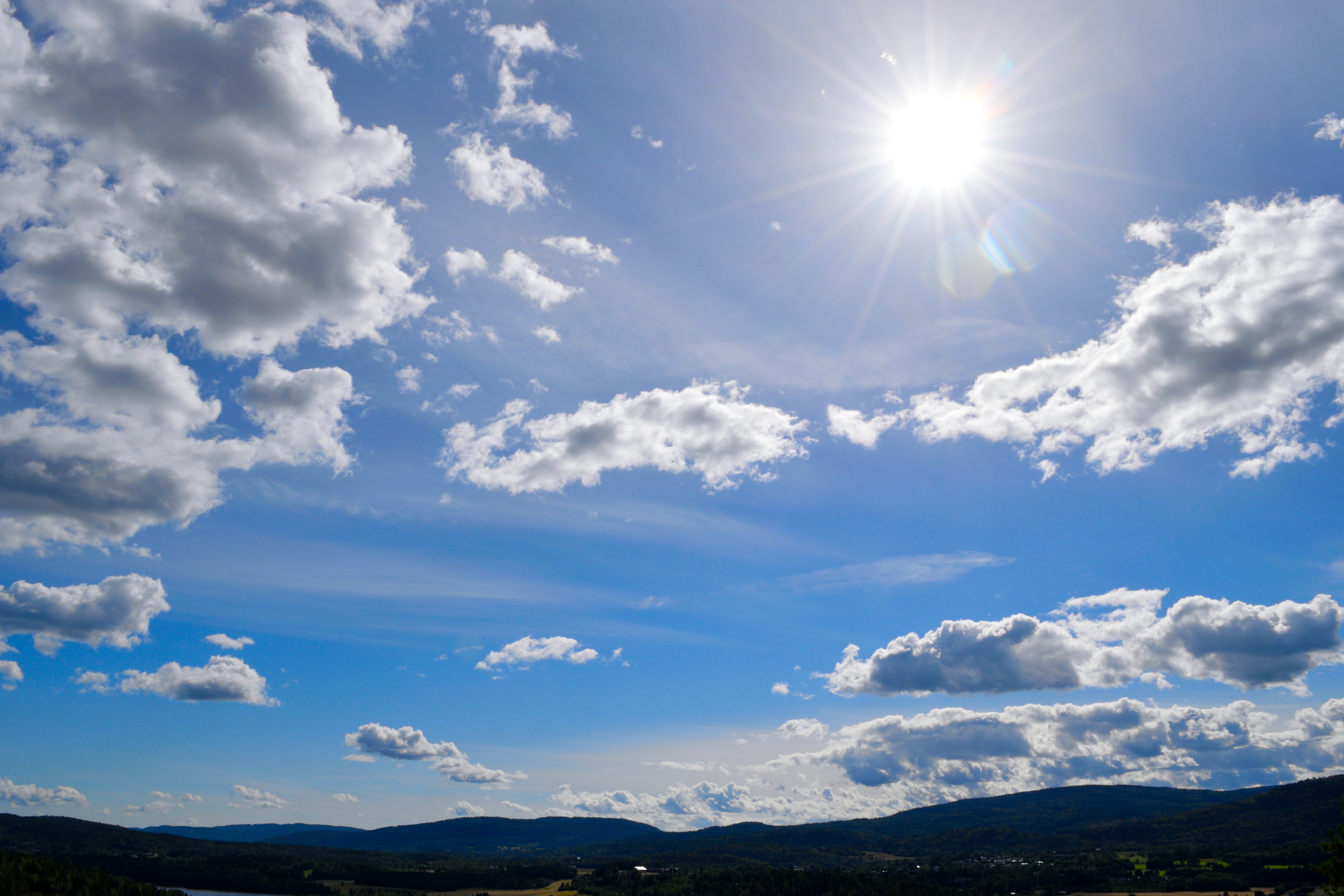
Daylight sky

Zojz is the Albanian continuation of *Di̯ḗu̯s, the name of the Proto-Indo-European daylight-sky-god. Cognates stemming from the noun *Di̯ḗu̯s with a similar phonological development are the Messapic Zis and Greek Zeus. In the Albanian Zoj-z, Messapic Zis, and Greek Ζεύς, the original cluster *di̯ of *di̯ḗu̯s underwent affrication to *dz. In Albanian it further assibilated into *z. Other Indo-European cognates are the Rigvedic Dyáuṣ and Latin Jovis.

=== Epithets ===
==== Sky Father ====
The zero grade radical of *di̯ḗu̯s and the epithet "father" are thought to be contained in an Albanian noun for "god" and the supreme entity – Zot. It is traditionally considered to be derived from Proto-Albanian *dźie̅u ̊ a(t)t-, an old compound for 'heavenly father' stemming PIE *dyew- ('sky, heaven, bright') attached to *átta ('father'), thus a cognate to PIE *Dyḗus ph₂tḗr and with its various descendants: Illyrian Dei-pátrous, Sanskrit द्यौष्पितृ (Dyáuṣ Pitṛ́), Proto-Italic *djous patēr (whence Latin Iuppiter), Ancient Greek Ζεῦ πάτερ (Zeû páter).

The plural form zota, "gods", is also attested in the first known printed book in Albanian – the Missal of Gjon Buzuku. The term zot is also used for "ruler", "patron", "lord", "master of the house", "owner"; however, the original semantic difference between sacred and profane is shown by the plural paradigm: zot-a for "gods" on the one hand; zot-ën or zot-ërinj for "ruler", "patron", "lord", "owner" on the other hand.

==== Beauty of the Sky ====
In Albanian the god/lord of the sky/heaven is also referred to as i Bukuri i Qiellit 'the Beauty of the Sky', a phrase that is used in Albanian pagan contexts for the Sun (Dielli), worshiped as the god of light, sky and weather, giver of life, health and energy, and all-seeing eye. As the wide set of cultic traditions dedicated to him indicates, the Albanian Sun-god appears to be an expression of the Proto-Indo-European Sky-god (Zot or Zojz in Albanian).

=== Reflections ===
==== "Divine, Goddess" ====
Albanian Zonjë, originally Zotnjë, "Goddess, Lady" (e.g. Zonja e Dheut or Zôja e Dheut and Zôja Prende or Zôja e Bukuris) are considered to contain the PAlb root *dźie̅u ̊ (< PIE *di̯ḗu̯s): Alb. zo(n)jë < Old Alb. zot-një < PAlb *zotVnia̅ (with Alb. zot < *dźie̅u ̊ a(t)t-). Zónja (also Zónja të Jáshtëme) is the Arbëreshë variant of the Albanian theonym Zana. Also Albanian Zana "nymph, goddess" is considered to contain the PIE root *di̯ḗu̯s

Ancient Greek Dióne, parallel to Latin Diāna, could be regarded as a feminine counterpart of the Sky-God. An Albanian assonant noun is ζόνε Zonë, which appears in Albanian oaths like περ τένε ζόνε, për tënë Zonë, "By our God/Lord", and in Old Albanian texts for Pater Noster "God the Father" (Tënëzonë, tënë-Zonë). It is equivalent to the Albanian accusative Zótënë/Zótnë, obtained through the assimilation of -tënë/-tnë into -në. At the sanctuary of Dodona the Greek Sky-God Zeus is paired with Dione, and the geographical coincidence of the Albanian case is remarkable.

==== "Daylight" ====
The Albanian verb din < PAlb *dī̆i̯a/i- "break of the daylight, to be bright, to shine", contains the PIE root dei̯h₂- "to be bright, to shine".

This root is thought to be found also in the second element (dí/día/dei) of the name Perëndi, one of the nouns used in Albanian to refer to the supreme entity. Uncapitalized it is also used for "deity", or in some dialects for the "sky, heaven" with both direct and figurative meaning.

== History ==
The confrontation between the belief systems of Pre-Indo-European populations—who favored 'Mother Earth Cults' comprising earthly beliefs, female deities and priesthood—and of Indo-European populations who favored 'Father Heaven Cults' comprising celestial beliefs, male deities and priesthood, might be reflected in the dichotomy of matriarchy and patriarchy that emerges from the two types of female warriors/active characters in Albanian epic poetry, in particular in the Kângë Kreshnikësh. (Note: In Albanian epics there are on the one hand female characters who play an active role in the quest and the decisions that affect the whole tribe, on the other hand those who undergo a masculinization process as a condition to be able to participate actively in the fights according to the principles of the Kanun.) Nevertheless, the Albanian belief system has preserved also the importance of the cult of the earth, Dheu.

Early evidence of the celestial cult in Illyria, which finds correspondences with Albanian folk beliefs and practices, is provided by 6th century BCE plaques from Lake Shkodra, which belonged to the Illyrian tribal area of what was referred in historical sources to as the Labeatae in later times. The plaques depict simultaneously sacred representations of the sky and the sun, and symbolism of lightning and fire, as well as the sacred tree and birds (eagles). In classical antiquity the sky and lightning god Zojz was presumably worshiped by Illyrians as the ancestors of the Albanians. Albanian Zojz is the clear equivalent and cognate of Messapic Zis and Ancient Greek Zeus, the continuations of the Proto-Indo-European *Di̯ḗu̯s 'sky god'.

In the pre-Christian pagan period the term Zot was presumably used in Albanian to refer to the sky father/god/lord, father-god, heavenly father (the Indo-European father daylight-sky-god). After the first access of the ancestors of the Albanians to the Christian religion in antiquity the term Zot has been used for God, the Father and the Son (Christ). The cult of the sky is preserved in Albanian oath swearings, which are often taken by sky (e.g. për atë qiell, pasha qiellin!), as well as expressly 'by Zojz', Alb.: "Pasha Zojzin!". A typical folk expression says: Beja me rrêna ka rrufenë! "Swearing with lies, there is lightning!". The worship and practices associated to the sky and lightning deity have been preserved until the 20th century, and in some forms still continue today.

== Cult, practices and folk beliefs ==
=== Sky and lightning ===
Early evidence of the celestial cult in Illyria is provided by 6th century BCE Illyrian plaques from Lake Shkodra. Each of those plaques portray simultaneously sacred representations of the sky and the sun, and symbolism of lightning and fire, as well as the sacred tree and birds (eagles). In those plaques there is a mythological representation of the celestial deity: the Sun deity animated with a face and two wings, throwing lightning into a fire altar (the main thunderbolt that reaches the fire altar is also represented as a polearm at the extremity), which in some plaques is held by two men (sometimes on two boats). In those plaques, the Illyrian symbolism of the birds (eagles and two-headed eagle), finds correspondences to the myth of the Eagle of Zeus. The sacred significance of the eagle as a celestial symbol has been scrupulously preserved by Albanians, who have always considered it their animal totem.

The Illyrian plaques represent a practice that links the lightning and the hearth fire, which is similar to the Albanian ritual traditionally performed during big storms with torrential rains, lightning and hail, which often cause great damage to agriculture, livestock, and to the rural economy in general. The practice consists in bringing outdoors a fire container (Albanian: vatër me zjarr) and fire-related metallic objects seeking assistance from the supernatural power of the Fire, in order to turn the storm away and to avert the harms it can cause to the community.

The Albanian practice has been interpreted either as a form of prayer to appease the weather god in order to turn the storm away, or an act to give strength to the divine hero drangue for his struggle against the kulshedra, the demon of darkness and evil that causes the storms. Indeed, Albanian folk beliefs regard the lightning as Zjarri i Qiellit ("the Fire of the Sky") and consider it as the "weapon of the deity" (arma/shtiza/pushka e zotit). An Albanian word to refer to the lightning is rrufeja, related to rhomphaia, an ancient polearm.

Albanians traditionally believed in the supreme powers of thunder-stones (kokrra e rrufesë or guri i rejës), which were believed to be formed during lightning strikes and to be fallen from the sky. Thunder-stones were preserved in family life as important cult objects. It was believed that bringing them inside the house could bring good fortune, prosperity and progress in people, in livestock and in agriculture, or that rifle bullets would not hit the owners of the thunder-stones. A common practice was to hung a thunder-stone pendant on the body of the cattle or on the pregnant woman for good luck and to contrast the evil eye.

In Albanian culture, the heaviest type of oath swearing (Alb. beja më e rëndë) is taken by a thunder-stone "which comes from the sky" (beja me gur/kokërr reje/rrufeje që vjen nga perëndia). It was a very serious oath and people were afraid of it even though they were telling the truth. The act of absolving himself of any allegation of theft was performed in the following way: the thunder-stone was taken in the left hand and was touched by the right hand saying:

Për këtë kokërr rejet, nuk ta kam vjedhë as unë, as kush i shpisë sime e nuk e di se kush ta ka vjedhë! Në të rrejsha, reja më gjoftë!

Translation:

I swear by this thunder-stone that I have not stolen it, nor anyone of my house and I don't know who stole it! If I lied to you, may cloud strike me!

=== Dualistic struggle – cosmic renewal ===
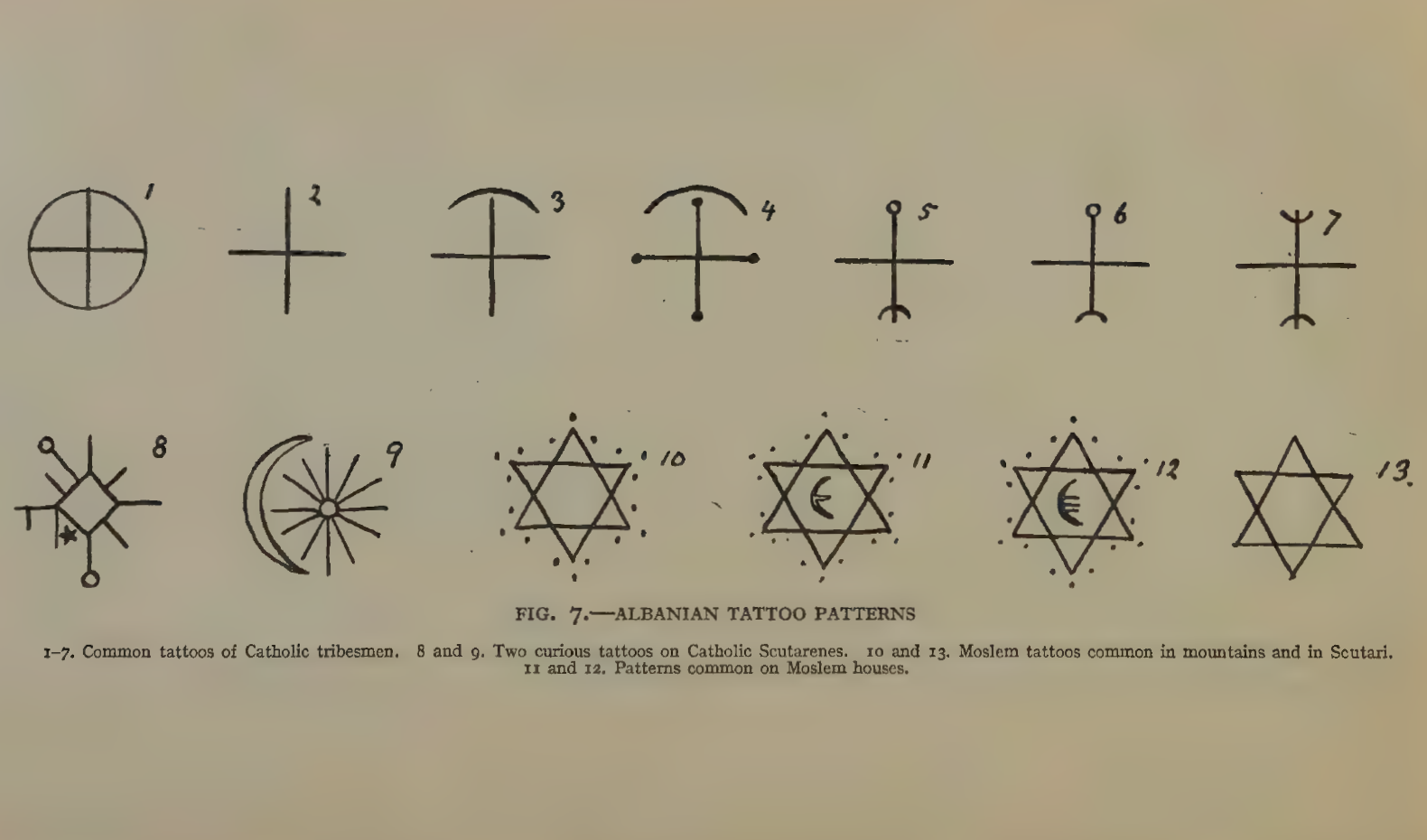
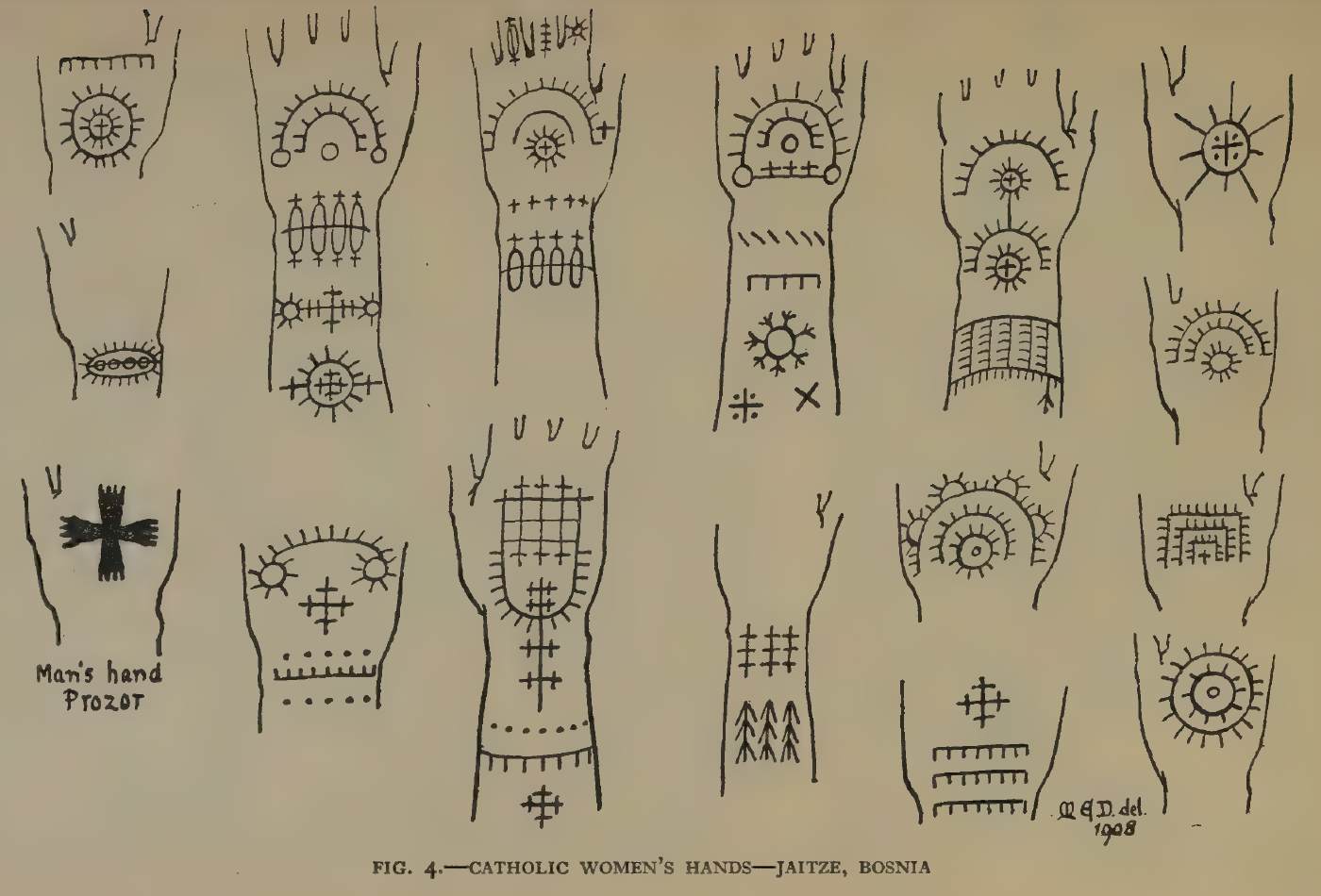
Tattoo patterns of northern Albanians (top); tattoo patterns of Catholic women (and one man) in Bosnia (bottom). Drawn by Edith Durham in the early 20th century. Many of those patterns also appear on Albanian traditional art (graves, jewellery, embroidery, and house carvings). They are symbols of celestial, light, fire and hearth worship, expressing the favor of the light within the dualistic struggle between light and darkness.

Albanian beliefs, myths and legends are organized around the dualistic struggle between good and evil, light and darkness, which cyclically produces the cosmic renewal. Ritual calendar fires (zjarret e vitit) are practiced in relation to the cosmic cycle and the rhythms of agricultural and pastoral life. Exercising a great influence on Albanian major traditional feasts and calendar rites, the Sun is worshiped as the god of light and giver of life, who fades away the darkness of the world and melts the frost, allowing the renewal of Nature.

The most famous Albanian mythological representation of the dualistic struggle between good and evil, light and darkness, is the constant battle between drangue and kulshedra, a conflict that symbolises the cyclic return in the watery and chthonian world of death, accomplishing the cosmic renewal of rebirth. The legendary battle of a heroic deity associated with thunder and weather – like drangue – who fights and slays a huge multi-headed serpent associated with water, storms, and drought – like kulshedra – is a common motif of Indo-European mythology. The original legend may have symbolized the Chaoskampf, a clash between forces of order and chaos.

In Albanian tradition the clash between drangue and kulshedra, light and darkness, is furthermore seen as a mythological representation of the cult of the Sun and the Moon, widely observed in Albanian traditional tattooing and in other expressions of traditional art (graves, jewellery, embroidery, and house carvings). The supremacy of the deity of the sky – the light side – over that of the underworld – the dark side – is symbolized by the victory of celestial divine heroes against kulshedra, an earthly/chthonic deity or demon originating from darkness. Those celestial divine heroes are often drangue (the most widespread culture hero among Albanians), but also e Bija e Hënës dhe e Diellit ("the Daughter of the Moon and the Sun") who is referred to as pika e qiellit ("drop of the sky" or "lightning"), which falls everywhere from heaven on the mountains and the valleys and strikes pride and evil, or by other heroic characters marked in their bodies by the symbols of celestial objects, such as Zjermi (lit. "the Fire"), who notably is born with the Sun on his forehead.

=== Role and attributes ===
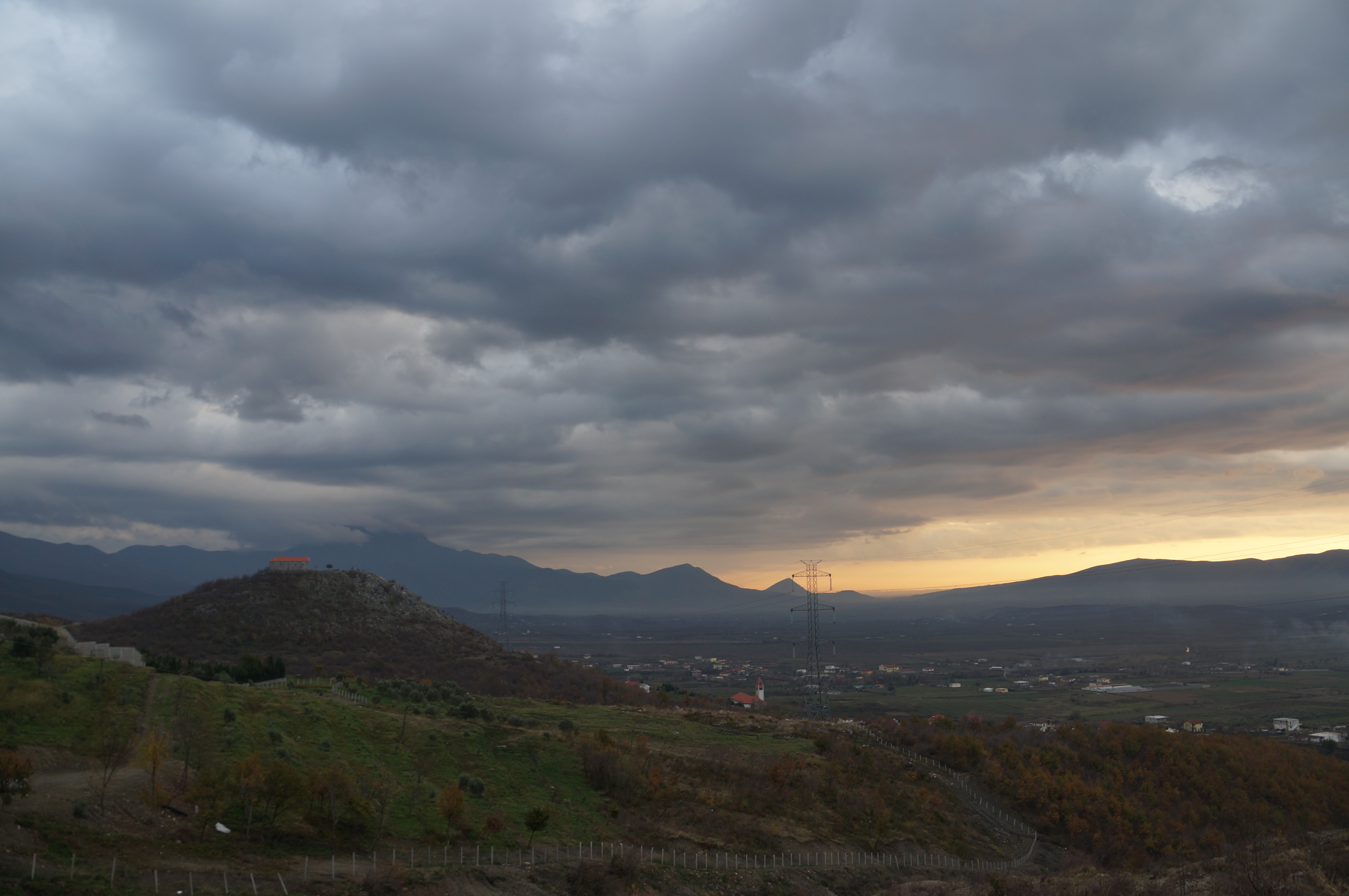
Region of Zadrima, where traces of Zojz' worship survived until the early 20th century

Considered as the chief god and the highest of all gods, traces of Zojz' worship survived in the Zadrima region in northern Albania until the early 20th century. The local people used to swear "Pasha Zojzin!". According to the elders, Zojzi lives among the clouds with a thunderbolt in his hand. It was believed that he notices the deeds of the people, who are frightened by his power because when he realises that people are sinning, he brings them destruction hurling his thunderbolt on the trees and the tall buildings, and burning and smashing the sinners. Local Albanian mythology has it that Zojz has a son and a daughter. His son is called Plutoni (cf. the Ancient Greek Pluto), the god of fire and the underworld. With the fire in his hand, he holds control of the center of the Earth. Plutoni used to be worshiped as well. Zojz's daughter is the goddess Prende, widely worshiped in northern Albania.

The Albanian noun Zot, used to refer to the supreme entity, is regarded as the Albanian equivalent of the Indo-European sky-father-god. The worship of the father god, being regarded as the father of gods and humans, has survived in central Albanian mythology and folklore until today, associated with the cult of Mount Tomorr. In central Albanian folk beliefs the god associated with this mountain is euphemistically referred to as "Him of Tomorr" and "the Holy One of Tomorr", and Albanian solemn oath swearings are taken by him. He is personified anthropomorphically as an old man with a long white beard flowing down to his belt. He is accompanied by female eagles and the winds are his servants. His consort is e Bukura e Dheut ("The Beauty of the Earth"), a chthonic/earth goddess. The sister of e Bukura e Dheut is e Bukura e Detit ("The Beauty of the Sea"), a sea-goddess.

==== Relation with the Sun ====
As the wide set of cultic traditions dedicated to him indicates, the Albanian Sun-god (Dielli) appears to be an expression of the Proto-Indo-European Sky-god (Zot or Zojz in Albanian).

In Albanian the god who rules the sky is referred to as i Bukuri i Qiellit ("the Beauty of the Sky"), a phrase that is used in pagan contexts for the Sun (Dielli), worshiped as the god of light, sky and weather, giver of life, health and energy, and all-seeing eye.

Albanians often swear solemn oaths (be) "by the sun" (për atë diell), "by the sun who lights up the earth" (Për atë diell që shndrit token!), "by the sun who makes the sky cloudy or clears it up" (Për atë diell që vran e kthiell!), "by the sun who got tired" (për atë diell që vete lodhur!), "by the face of the sun" (për atë fytyrë të diellit!), "by the eye-sun" (për atë sy diell), "by that big eye, who sees everything" ("për atë symadh, që i sheh të gjitha), "by the eye of the sun" (për sy të diellit), "by the star" (për atë hyll), "by the ray of light" (për këtë rreze drite) and "by the sunbeam" (për këtë rreze dielli).

The Albanian oath taken "by the eye-sun", "by that big eye, who sees everything", "by the eye of the sun", "by the star", etc., is a reflection of the Indo-European belief according to which the Sun is the eye of the Sky-God *Di̯ḗu̯s.

According to folk beliefs, the Sun is all-seeing, with a single glance he possesses the ability to see the entire surface of the Earth. The Sun, referred to as "the all-seeing (big) eye" is invoked in solemn oaths (be), and information about everything that happens on Earth is asked to the all-seeing Sun in ritual songs.

According to Albanian folk beliefs, the Sun makes the sky cloudy or clears it up. Albanians used to invoke the Sun and the sky (also perendi, alternatively meaning "deity" or "sky") with rainmaking and soil fertility rituals. In rainmaking rituals from the Albanian Ionian Sea Coast, Albanians used to pray to the Sun, in particular facing Mount Shëndelli (Mount "Holy Sun"). Children used to dress a boy with fresh branches, calling him dordolec. After the ritual people used to say: Do kemi shi se u nxi Shëndëlliu ("We will have rain because Shëndëlliu went dark"). The Sun used to be also invoked when reappearing after the rain, prayed for increased production in agriculture.

In an Arbëreshë folk song of mythological nature, e Bija e Hënës dhe e Diellit ("the Daughter of the Moon and the Sun") is referred to as pika e qiellit ("drop of the sky" or "lightning"), which falls everywhere from heaven on the mountains and the valleys and strikes pride and evil.

According to a modern interpretation, the ancestors of the Albanians presumably had in common with the Ancient Greek theogony the tripartite division of the administration of the world into heaven, sea, and underworld, and in the same functions as the Greek deities Zeus, Poseidon, and Hades, they would have worshiped the deities referred to as the Beauty of the Sky (i Bukuri i Qiellit), the Beauty of the Sea (e Bukura e Detit), and the Beauty of the Earth (e Bukura e Dheut). The phrase "the Beauty of the Sky" continues to be used in Albanian to refer to the Sun in pagan contexts and to the monotheistic God in Abrahamic contexts, the Beauty of the Sea and the Beauty of the Earth are kept as figures of Albanian folk beliefs and fairy tales.

=== Mountain cult and sacrifices ===
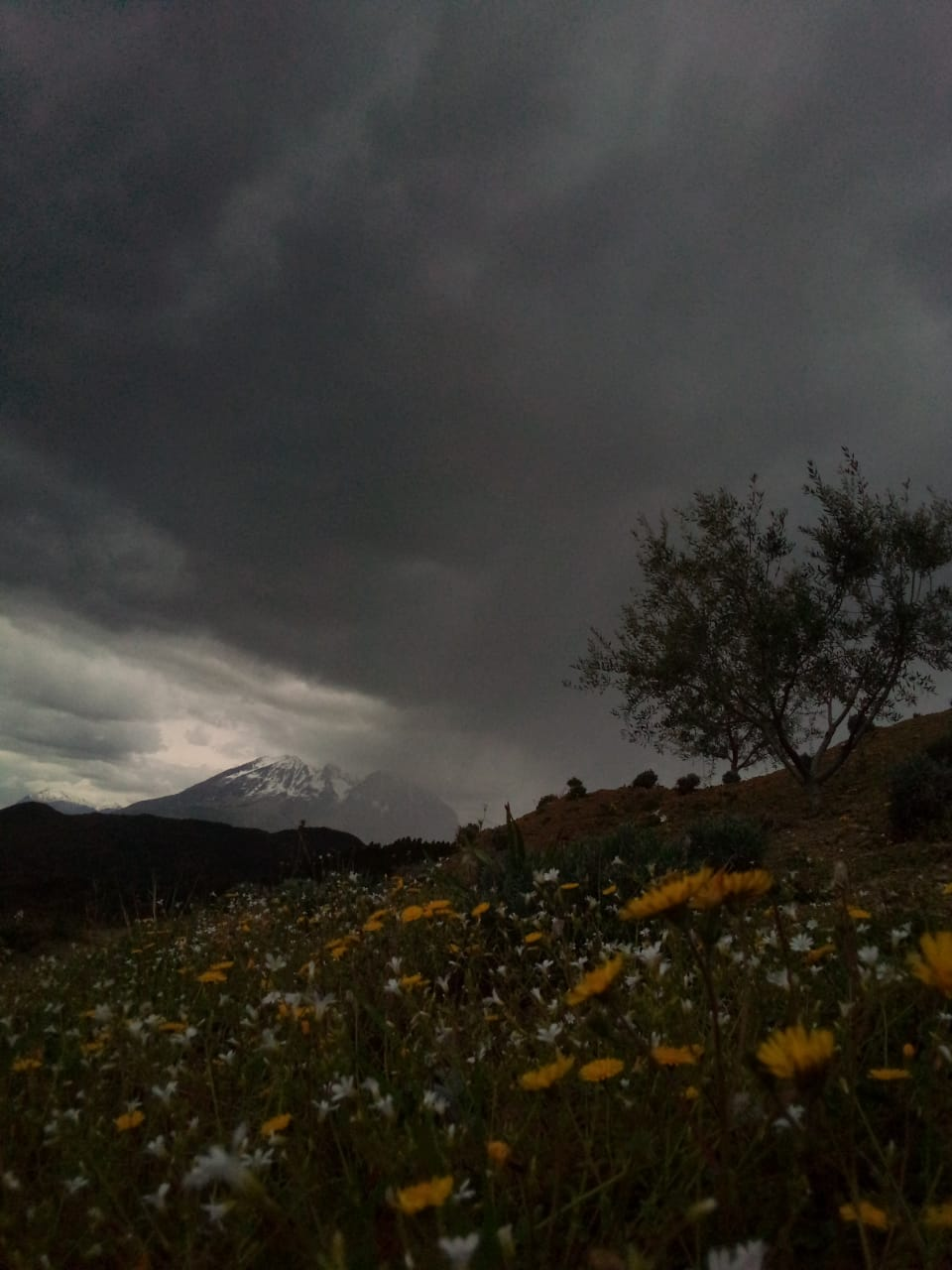
View of Mount Tomorr from the Tunja village

According to Albanian folk beliefs, Zojz resides on the peak of mountains such as Mount Tomorr, the highest and most inaccessible mountain of central Albania, considered the home of the deities. This tradition has been preserved in folk beliefs until recent times. The enduring sanctity of the mountain, the annual pilgrimage to its summit, and the solemn sacrifice of a white bull by the local people provide abundant evidence that the ancient cult of the sky-god on Mount Tomorr continues through the generations almost untouched by the course of political events and religious changes. The Albanian pagan cult practiced on several sacred mountains (notably in Tomorr, Pashtrik, Lybeten, Gjallicë, Rumia, Koritnik, Shkëlzen, Mount Krujë, Shelbuem, Këndrevicë, Maja e Hekurave, Shëndelli and many others) performed with pilgrimages, prayers to the Sun, ritual bonfires, and animal sacrifices, is very widespread in Albanian inhabited territories.

Mount Tomorr certainly seems to have been the site of a pre-Christian cult, being worshiped still today by the locals, both Christians and Muslims, as a mountain with a supernatural force—swearing solemn oaths "By Him of Tomorr" and "By the Holy One of Tomorr", and practicing ritual sacrifices of animals—long before the shrine of Abbas Ali was correlated with the sacred site. The name of the village Mbrakull/Vrakull at the foot of Mount Tomorr, which evolved through Albanian sound changes from Latin: oraculum, suggests the existence of an oracle in the area during antiquity.

=== Sky and Earth pairing ===
The sky is often paired with the earth in Albanian oath swearings, e.g.: për qiell e dhé, pasha tokën e pasha qiellin, etc.

== Mythical tale ==
An Albanian mythical tale concerning the highest of the gods, who uses thunderbolts to defeat the sea-storm god Talas, has been documented in the early 20th century from the Shala region in northern Albania.

=== Synopsis ===
As the wife of the highest god was soaring over the seas to delight in the sight of the order which her husband's wisdom had created, the god Talas noticed her. She was so beautiful that no other goddess could match her. So the god Talas went after the wife of the highest god and as soon as he reached her, he raped her through the use of brute force. Afterwards the wife of the highest god, despite being above all the other goddesses, decided to take her own life due to the desecration she suffered, (Note: Talas had attacked and desecrated her in a shameful manner, so that in future she could no longer be seen among the others. Note that besa and nderi (honour) are of major importance in Albanian customary law as the cornerstone of personal and social conduct.) but only after telling her husband what she had been through. So she stepped before her husband, and immediately after reporting what happened, she seized a weapon and stretched herself as a corpse before the highest of the gods. Because of that horrible suicide, but more than that, because of the defilement which his wife had suffered from the god Talas, the highest god swore an oath to take vengeance on the god who did that disgrace to him. After some time the highest god accomplished his revenge by hitting Talas with one of his cruel thunderbolts that tore him to pieces, after which his corpse would have emitted a stormy wind that no one could approach, so his whole body was buried in the ground. The god Talas did not smell like humans, but rather more pleasant. Hence the interpretation that he was the god of the sea-storm or the god of the storm surge.

== In oral epic poetry ==
The Kângë Kreshnikësh – the traditional songs of the heroic legendary cycle of Albanian epic poetry – always begin with a ritual praise to the supreme being: "Lum për ty o i lumi Zot!" ("Praise be to you, o praised God!"). This introductory religious formula brings the audience into a distant world and a primordial time. Including elements ranging from paganism to monotheism, the primeval religiosity of the Albanian mountains and epic poetry is reflected by a supreme deity who is the god of the universe and who is conceived through the belief in the fantastic and supernatural beings and things, resulting in an extremely structured imaginative creation. The components of Nature are animated and personified deities, so the Moon (Hëna), the Sun (Dielli), the stars, the clouds, the lightning, the Earth (Dheu/Toka), the mountains, etc. participate in the world of humans influencing their events. People also address oaths or long curses to the animated elements of nature. The supreme god allows the existence of terrestrial female deities with their intervention in earthly events and interaction with humans. Indeed, in their life, the heroes can be assisted by zanas and oras, who symbolize the vital energy and existential time of human beings respectively. The zana idealizes feminine energy, wild beauty, eternal youth and the joy of nature. They appear as warlike nymphs capable of offering simple mortals a part of their own psychophysical and divine power, giving humans strength comparable to that of the drangue. The ora represent the "moment of the day" (Albanian: koha e ditës) and the flowing of human destiny. As masters of time and place, they take care of humans (also of the zana and of some particular animals) watching over their life, their house and their hidden treasures before sealing their destiny. Hence, the goddesses of fate "maintain the order of the universe and enforce its laws" – "organising the appearance of humankind." However great his power, the supreme god holds an executive role as he only carries out what has been already ordained by the fate goddesses.

== See also ==
- Albanian mythology
- Drangue
- En (deity)
- Perëndi
- Shurdh
- Verbt

== Bibliography ==
- Berishaj, Martin (2004). Skrita moč bese: Ženske v imaginariju albanskega tradicionalizma. Dodatek: Skenderbegov kanon (in Slovenian). Založba ZRC. ISBN 9789616500746.
- Brahaj, Jaho (2007). Flamuri i Kombit Shqiptar: origjina, lashtësia. Enti Botues "Gjergj Fishta". ISBN 9789994338849.
- Bulo, Jorgo (1997). "Mali i shenjtë i Tomorrit. Nga kulti pagan te miti romantik". Perla, revistë shkencore-kulturore tremujore (4). Tiranë: 3–7.
- Çabej, Eqrem (1966). "Albanische Volkskunde". Südost-Forschungen (25): 333–387.
- Çabej, Eqrem (1996). Studime etimologjike në fushë të shqipes. Vol. 4. Akademia e Shkencave e RPS të Shqipërisë, Instituti i Gjuhësisë dhe i Letërsisë.
- Camaj, Martin; Fox, Leonard (January 1984). Albanian Grammar: With Exercises, Chrestomathy and Glossaries. Otto Harrassowitz Verlag. ISBN 978-3-447-02467-9.
- Chelariu, Ana R. (2023). Romanian Folklore and its Archaic Heritage: A cultural and Linguistic Comparative Study. Springer Nature. ISBN 978-3-031-04051-1.
- Clayer, Nathalie (2017). "The pilgrimage to Mount Tomor in Albania: A changing sacred place in a changing society". In Tsypylma, Darieva; Kahl, Thede; Tonchev, Svetoslava (eds.). Sakralität und Mobilität im Kaukasus und in Südosteuropa. Austrian Academy of Sciences Press. pp. 125–142. ISBN 978-3-7001-8099-9.
- Cook, Arthur Bernard (1964) [1914]. Zeus: Zeus, god of the bright sky. Zeus: A Study in Ancient Religion. Vol. 1. Biblo and Tannen.
- Cook, Arthur Bernard (2010) [1940]. Zeus: Zeus, God of the Dark Sky (earthquakes, clouds, wind, dew, rain, meteorites). Zeus: A Study in Ancient Religion. Vol. 3 (Part 2). Cambridge University Press. ISBN 9781108021234.
- Curtis, Matthew C. (2017). "The phonology of Albanian". In Klein, Jared; Joseph, Brian; Fritz, Matthias (eds.). Handbook of Comparative and Historical Indo-European Linguistics. Vol. 3. Walter de Gruyter. ISBN 978-3110540369.
- Dedvukaj, Lindon (2023). "Linguistic evidence for the Indo-European and Albanian origin of Aphrodite". Proceedings of the Linguistic Society of America. 8 (1). Linguistic Society of America: 5500. doi:10.3765/plsa.v8i1.5500. S2CID 258381736.
- Demiraj, Bardhyl (1997). Albanische Etymologien: Untersuchungen zum albanischen Erbwortschatz. Leiden Studies in Indo-European (in German). Vol. 7. Amsterdam, Atlanta: Rodopi.
- Demiraj, Bardhyl (2002). "Einheitlichkeit und Spaltung im Laufe des Christianisierungsprozesses der Albaner. Eine ethno-linguistische Fallstudie" (PDF). Studime (in German). Academy of Albanological Studies: 23–41.
- Demiraj, Bardhyl (2011). "Rrënjë dhe degë të krishterimit ndër shqiptarë" (PDF). Hylli i Dritës (in Albanian). 2. Shkodër: 58–78.
- Demiraj, Bardhyl (2024a). "ZOT -i". DPEWA - Digitales Philologisch-Etymologisches Wörterbuch des Altalbanischen.
- Demiraj, Bardhyl (2024b). "ZÓNJ|Ë -a". DPEWA - Digitales Philologisch-Etymologisches Wörterbuch des Altalbanischen.
- Doja, Albert (2005). "Mythology and Destiny" (PDF). Anthropos. 100 (2): 449–462. doi:10.5771/0257-9774-2005-2-449. JSTOR 40466549. S2CID 115147696.
- Durham, Edith (1928a). High Albania. LO Beacon Press. ISBN 978-0-8070-7035-2.
- Durham, Edith (1928b). Some tribal origins, laws and customs of the Balkans.
- Egro, Dritan (2003). Islam in Albanian Lands During the First Two Centuries of the Ottoman Rule. Department of History of Bilkent University.
- Elsie, Robert (1994). Albanian Folktales and Legends. Naim Frashëri Publishing Company. Archived from the original (pdf) on 2009-07-28.
- Elsie, Robert (2000). "The Christian Saints of Albania". Balkanistica. 13 (36): 35–57.
- Elsie, Robert (2001). A Dictionary of Albanian Religion, Mythology and Folk Culture. London: Hurst & Company. ISBN 1-85065-570-7.
- Elsie, Robert (2019). The Albanian Bektashi: History and Culture of a Dervish Order in the Balkans. Bloomsbury Publishing. ISBN 9781788315715.
- Fakaj, Përparim (2022). "Diversity of Popular Expressions in Albanian Dialect Dictionaries". Buletini Shkencor Reald. 7 (2): 24–41. doi:10.59858/BSHR10012 (inactive 7 November 2026). ISSN 2411-5592.
- Feizi, Abidin (1929). Grammatica della lingua albanese. Pubblicazione del R. Istituto orientale di Napoli. Napoli: Achille Cimmaruta.
- Fishta, Gjergj; Lambertz, Maximilian (1958). "Die Laute des Hochlandes (Lahuta e malcis)". Südosteuropäische Arbeiten. 51. R. Oldenbourg. ISSN 0933-6850.
- Galaty, Michael; Lafe, Ols; Lee, Wayne; Tafilica, Zamir (2013). Light and Shadow: Isolation and Interaction in the Shala Valley of Northern Albania. The Cotsen Institute of Archaeology Press. ISBN 978-1931745710.
- Gawrych, George (2006). The Crescent and the Eagle: Ottoman rule, Islam and the Albanians, 1874–1913. London: IB Tauris. p. 36. ISBN 9781845112875.
- Gjoni, Irena (2012). Marrëdhënie të miteve dhe kulteve të bregdetit të Jonit me areale të tjera mitike (PhD) (in Albanian). Tirana: University of Tirana, Faculty of History and Philology.
- Hasluck, Margaret (2015). The Unwritten Law in Albania. Cambridge University Press. ISBN 9781107586932.
- Huld, Martin E. (1985). "An Indo-European Accentual Contrast in Albanian". Zeitschrift für vergleichende Sprachforschung. 98 (1): 99–106. JSTOR 40849512.
- Hyllested, Adam; Joseph, Brian D. (2022). "Albanian". In Olander, Thomas (ed.). The Indo-European Language Family : A Phylogenetic Perspective. Cambridge University Press. pp. 223–245. doi:10.1017/9781108758666. ISBN 9781108758666. S2CID 161016819.
- Hysi, Shyqyri (2006). "Kulte tradicionale shqiptare" [Albanian Traditional Cults]. Gjurmime Albanologjike - Folklor Dhe Etnologji (in Albanian) (36). Instituti Albanologjik i Prishtinës: 349–361.
- Demiraj, Bardhyl; Starostin, Sergei; Lubotsky, Alexander; de Vaan, Michiel. "The Albanian inherited lexicon" (Database).
- Jakobson, Roman (1985). "Linguistic Evidence in Comparative Mythology". In Stephen Rudy (ed.). Roman Jakobson: Selected Writings. Vol. VII: Contributions to Comparative Mythology: Studies in Linguistics and Philology, 1972–1982. Walter de Gruyter. ISBN 9783110855463.
- Kölligan, Daniel (2017). "The lexicon of Proto-Indo-European". In Klein, Jared; Joseph, Brian; Fritz, Matthias (eds.). Handbook of Comparative and Historical Indo-European Linguistics. Vol. 3. Walter de Gruyter. ISBN 978-3110540369.
- Kondi, Bledar (2017). "Un regard critique sur l'ethnographie de la mort en Albanie". Ethnologie française. 166 (2): 277–288. doi:10.3917/ethn.172.0277.
- Krasniqi, Nysret (2019). "Topofilia letrare" (PDF). STUDIME, Revistë për studime filologjike (in Albanian). 26. Kosova Academy of Sciences and Arts: 129–138.
- Krasniqi, Shensi (2014). "Pilgrimages in mountains in Kosovo". Revista Santuários, Cultura, Arte, Romarias, Peregrinações, Paisagens e Pessoas. ISSN 2183-3184.
- Lambertz, Maximilian (1922). Albanische Märchen (und andere Texte zur albanischen Volkskunde). Wien: A. Hölder.
- Lambertz, Maximilian (1949). Gjergj Fishta und das albanische Heldenepos Lahuta e Malcís, Laute des Hochlandes: eine Einführung in die albanische Sagenwelt. O. Harrassowitz.
- Lelaj, Olsi (2015). "Mbi tatuazhin në shoqërinë shqiptare" [On Tattoo in the Albanian Society]. Kultura Popullore. 34 (71–72). Centre of Albanological Studies: 91–118. ISSN 2309-5717.
- Loria-Rivel, Gustavo Adolfo (2020). "Dede Korkut and its Parallelisms with Albanian Epic Traditions. Female Warriors in Albanian and Turkic Epics". In Nikol Dziub, Greta Komur-Thilloy (ed.). Penser le multiculturalisme dans les marges de l'Europe. Studies on South East Europe. Vol. 26. LIT Verlag Münster. pp. 45–53. ISBN 9783643912930.
- Lurker, Manfred (2005). The Routledge Dictionary of Gods and Goddesses, Devils and Demons. Routledge, Taylor & Francis. ISBN 0-203-64351-8.
- Mallory, James P.; Adams, Douglas Q. (1997), Encyclopedia of Indo-European Culture, London: Routledge, ISBN 978-1-884964-98-5
- Mann, Stuart E. (1948). An Historical Albanian-English Dictionary. Vol. II, N–Z. Longmans, Green and Co., LTD.
- Mann, Stuart E. (1952). "The Indo-European Consonants in Albanian". Language. 28 (1). Linguistic Society of America: 31–40. doi:10.2307/409988. JSTOR 409988.
- Mann, Stuart E (1977). An Albanian Historical Grammar. Hamburg: Helmut Buske Verlag. ISBN 9783871182624.
- Neri, Sergio (2021). "din". DPEWA - Digitales Philologisch-Etymologisches Wörterbuch des Altalbanischen.
- Orel, Vladimir E. (1998). Albanian Etymological Dictionary. Brill. ISBN 978-90-04-11024-3.
- Pipa, Arshi (1993). "The Mythology of Albania". In Bonnefoy, Yves (ed.). American, African, and Old European mythologies. University of Chicago Press. ISBN 0-226-06457-3.
- Poghirc, Cicerone (1987). "Albanian Religion". In Mircea Eliade (ed.). The Encyclopedia of Religion. Vol. 1. New York: MacMillan Publishing Co. pp. 178–180.
- Schirò, Giuseppe (1923). Canti tradizionali ed altri saggi delle colonie albanesi di Sicilia [Traditional Songs and other Essays from the Albanian Colonies of Sicily] (in Albanian and Italian). Stab. tip. L. Pierro.
- Schirò, Giuseppe (1959). Storia della letteratura albanese. Storia delle letterature di tutto il mondo (in Italian). Vol. 41. Nuova accademia.
- Sedaj, Engjëll (1982). "Ngjashmëri të hyjnive homerike dhe atyre shqiptare". Gjurmime Albanologjike. Albanological Institute of Prishtina: 71–90.
- Shuteriqi, Dhimitër S. (1959). Historia e letërsisë shqipe. Vol. 1. Universiteti Shtetëror i Tiranës, Instituti i Historisë dhe Gjuhësisë.
- Søborg, Tobias Mosbæk (2020). Sigmatic Verbal Formations in Anatolian and Indo-European: A Cladistic Study (Thesis). University of Copenhagen, Department of Nordic Studies and Linguistics.
- Sokoli, Ramadan (2000). Gojëdhana e përrallëza të botës shqiptare. Toena. ISBN 9789992713198.
- Sokoli, Ramadan (2013) [1999]. "The Albanian World in the Folk Teller's Stories". In Margaret Read MacDonald (ed.). Traditional Storytelling Today: An International Sourcebook. Translated by Pranvera Xhelo. Routledge. ISBN 9781135917142.
- Tirta, Mark (2004). Petrit Bezhani (ed.). Mitologjia ndër shqiptarë (in Albanian). Tirana: Mësonjëtorja. ISBN 99927-938-9-9.
- Treimer, Karl (1971). "Zur Rückerschliessung der illyrischen Götterwelt und ihre Bedeutung für die südslawische Philologie". In Henrik Barić (ed.). Arhiv za Arbanasku starinu, jezik i etnologiju. Vol. I. R. Trofenik. pp. 27–33.
- Ushaku, Ruzhdi (1988). "Mbi strukturën leksiko-semantike dhe etimologjike të tipit të togfjalëshit të shqipes burri i dheut (Mundësia për një rindërtim)". Gjurmime Albanologjike. 17–18. Albanological Institute of Prishtina: 63–76.
- Vata-Mikeli, Rovena (2023). "Shtresa mitologjike në kënget epike legjendare shqiptare, rasti i Eposit të Kreshnikëve". ALBANOLOGJIA International Journal of Albanology. 10 (19–20). University of Tetova: 428–431. eISSN 2545-4919. ISSN 1857-9485.
- Watkins, Calvert (1995). How to Kill a Dragon: Aspects of Indo-European Poetics. London: Oxford University Press. ISBN 978-0-19-514413-0.
- West, M. L. (2007). Indo-European Poetry and Myth. Oxford University Press. ISBN 978-0-19-928075-9.
- Xhuvani, Aleksandër; Gurakuqi, Karl; Kamsi, Kolë; Çabej, Ekrem, eds. (1943). "Zojzi në Shqipni, Zojzi i Dodonës". Bota Shqiptare 3 (in Gheg Albanian). Tirana: Ministria e Arsimit. pp. 18–22.
