= I Verbti =

Albanian god of fire and wind or thunderstorms

I Verbti (Albanian: [i ˈveɾbti]) is an Albanian adjectival noun meaning "the blind one", (Note: Gheg Albanian: i verb(ë)t-i "the blind one", from the adjective i verbët "blind", Tosk Albanian: i verbër.) which was used in northern Albanian folk beliefs to refer to the god of fire and wind in the Zadrima region, and to the thunderstorm god in Dukagjin and the Malësia e Vogël; in Shala the thunderstorm god was referred to as Rmoria. These beliefs survived in northern Albania until recent times.

In Zadrima it was believed that by controlling the wind I Verbti is able to fan the flames of fire and move water, the opposite element to fire. The Albanian word for "Thursday" – e enjte – was evidently named after the Albanian fire god Enji. Originally holding a prominent role in the Albanian pantheon, under Christianization the god of fire and wind was demonized and considered a false god, and it was spread about that anyone who invoked him would be blinded by fire. The purifying power of fire underlies the popular idea according to which the god of fire is the enemy of uncleanliness and the opponent of filth.

In Dukagjin, Malësia e Vogël and Shala it was believed that the thunderstorm god Shën Verbti ("the holy blind one") or Rmoria lives in the clouds and travels using storm clouds which announce hailstorms when he arrives. He can be greeted and turned away with noise and gunshots. These beliefs and practices were similar to those associated with the thunderstorm god Shurdh.

== Name ==
=== Variants ===
I Verbti was used in the Zadrima region to refer to the god of fire and wind. Shën Verbti was used in Dukagjin and Malësia e Vogël for the thunderstorm god, who was referred to as Rmoria in Shala, and who bears similarities to the thunderstorm god Shurdh. The Albanian word for "Thursday" – e enjte – was evidently named after the Albanian fire god Enji.

=== Etymology ===
I Verbti is an Albanian adjectival noun: Gheg Albanian: i verb(ë)t-i "the blind one", from the adjective i verbët "blind", Tosk Albanian: i verbër. The Albanian adjective verbër ~ verb "blind" is borrowed from Latin: orbus undergoing typical Albanian phonetic development. Shën Verbti means "the holy blind one" in Albanian. Rrmoria is possibly from Latin: rumor 'shouting, noise, rumour'.

The connection of Shurdhi with the Albanian term i shurdhët meaning "the deaf one", seems to be only a coincidence, since the name Shurdh must be seen as a compound of *seuro, "water" (cf. Albanian shurrë "urine"), and *dos "giver/donor" (cf. Albanian dhashë/dha, "I gave/he gave"); his name thus means "water donor". A relation between the name Shurdh and the second part of the theonym Zibelsurdus found in ancient Thracian epigraphic monuments has been suggested.

The coincidence of the name of the weather and storm god Shurdh with the term shurdh-i "the deaf one" probably gave rise to the adjectival noun I Verbti "the blind one" or Shën Verbti "the holy blind one", which was used to refer to the weather and storm god in the Albanian Alps along with Rrmoria, and to refer to the fire and wind god in the Zadrima region.

The reconstructed name of the Albanian fire god *Enj- presumably continues Proto-Albanian *agni-, ultimately from *h₁n̥gʷnis, the archaic Proto-Indo-European word for 'fire' as an active force. The PIE name is also continued in the name of the Vedic fire god Agni, who in Vedic religion is associated with the Sun in the heavens, with lightning in the clouds, and with both hearth and ritual fire on the earth among humans. It has been suggested that the deity to whom Thursday was dedicated was worshiped by the Illyrians in antiquity and he may have been the most prominent god of the Albanian pantheon in Roman times by interpreting Jupiter, when week-day names were formed in the Albanian language. A prominent role played by the fire and wind god referred to as i Verbti is attested in the Zadrima region.

== Folk beliefs ==
=== Zadrima region ===
According to folk beliefs recorded from the Zadrima region, I Verbti is the god who controls fire and wind. By controlling the wind he is able to fan the flames of fire and move water, the opposite element to fire. He is said to have saved a boy from drowning after the people prayed to him. I Verbti performed the rescue by controlling the northern wind, which raised the water in billow, and the thus created waves threw the boy out of the water alive. I Verbti is described as a deity who hates uncleanliness and bad ways of speaking and he will punish anyone who speaks badly of him. The purifying power of fire underlies the popular idea according to which this deity is the enemy of uncleanliness and the opponent of filth.

With the coming of Christianity in Albania, I Verbti was demonized and considered a false god, and it was spread about that anyone who invoked him would be blinded by fire. However, in folk beliefs the god I Verbti was often considered more powerful than the Christian God. The struggle between the old and the new god and the predominant popularity of I Verbti in Albanian folk beliefs is expressed in a tale narrated from a Christian point of view, according to which two lads met together, then one said: "Let me pray to I Verbti! Afterwards we will go to fight on!" The other, however, replied to him: "I Verbti, there's no such thing! But the God in heaven, who is only one, he is the true God!" So one prayed to I Verbti and the other to the true God. Then they fought against each other. But God arranged it so that the one who prayed to the true God was killed, while the other who prayed to I Verbti survived. Hence all the people placed their hopes in I Verbti.

=== Albanian Alps ===
In Dukagjin, Malësia e Vogël and Shala it was believed that the thunderstorm god, referred there as Shën Verbti ("the holy blind one") or Rmoria, lives in the clouds and travels using storm clouds which announce hailstorms when he arrives. He can be greeted and turned away with noise from metallic objects and gunshots, according to the Albanian apotropaic ritual practiced in order to seek the protection of the fire deity from big storms with torrential rains, lightning and hail, which often cause great damage to agriculture, livestock, and to the rural economy in general.

According to a 1913 account reported by Albanologist Baron Franz Nopcsa, tribesmen of Shala shot with their firearms at an approaching storm, and they were pleased for their success in sending away the storm god, who went over the neighboring territory of Shoshi, no longer constituting a threat for Shala's grape harvest.

== See also ==
- Albanian mythology
- Drangue
- En (deity)
- Nëna e Vatrës
- Stihi
- Ljubi
- Zojz (deity)
- Perëndi
- Shurdh

== Sources ==
=== Bibliography ===
- Çabej, Eqrem (1966). "Albanische Volkskunde". Südost-Forschungen (25): 333–387.
- Demiraj, Bardhyl (1997). Albanische Etymologien: Untersuchungen zum albanischen Erbwortschatz. Leiden Studies in Indo-European (in German). Vol. 7. Amsterdam, Atlanta: Brill. ISBN 978-90-420-0161-9.
- Elsie, Robert (2001). A dictionary of Albanian religion, mythology and folk culture. NYU Press. p. 259. ISBN 978-1-85065-570-1.
- Jordan, Michael (August 2004). Dictionary of gods and goddesses. Infobase Publishing. ISBN 978-0-8160-5923-2.
- Lambertz, Maximilian (1922). Albanische Märchen (und andere Texte zur albanischen Volkskunde). Wien: A. Hölder.
- Lambertz, Maximilian (1973). "Die Mythologie der Albaner". In Hans Wilhelm Haussig (ed.). Wörterbuch der Mythologie (in German). Vol. 2. pp. 455–509.
- Lurker, Manfred (2005). The Routledge Dictionary of Gods and Goddesses, Devils and Demons. Routledge, Taylor & Francis. ISBN 0-203-64351-8.
- Lurker, Manfred (2004). The Routledge dictionary of gods and goddesses, devils and demons. Routledge. ISBN 978-0-415-34018-2.
- Orel, Vladimir (1998). Albanian etymological dictionary. Brill. ISBN 978-90-04-11024-3.
- Poghirc, Cicerone (1987). "Albanian Religion". In Mircea Eliade (ed.). The Encyclopedia of Religion. Vol. 1. New York: MacMillan Publishing Co. pp. 178–180.
- Rose, Carol (1996). Spirits, fairies, gnomes, and goblins: an encyclopedia of the little people. ABC-CLIO. pp. 327. ISBN 978-0-87436-811-6.
- Stadtmüller, Georg (1954). "Altheidnischer Volksglaube und Christianisierung in Albanien". Orientalia Christiana Periodica (in German). XX. Pontificium Institutum Orientalium Studiorum: 211–246.
- Tagliavini, Carlo (1963). Le origini delle lingue neolatine: introduzione alla filologia romanza. R. Patròn.
- Tirta, Mark (2004). Petrit Bezhani (ed.). Mitologjia ndër shqiptarë (in Albanian). Tirana: Mësonjëtorja. ISBN 99927-938-9-9.
- Treimer, Karl (1971). "Zur Rückerschliessung der illyrischen Götterwelt und ihre Bedeutung für die südslawische Philologie". In Henrik Barić (ed.). Arhiv za Arbanasku starinu, jezik i etnologiju. Vol. I. R. Trofenik. pp. 27–33.
