= Weather god =

Deity associated with thunder, rains and storms

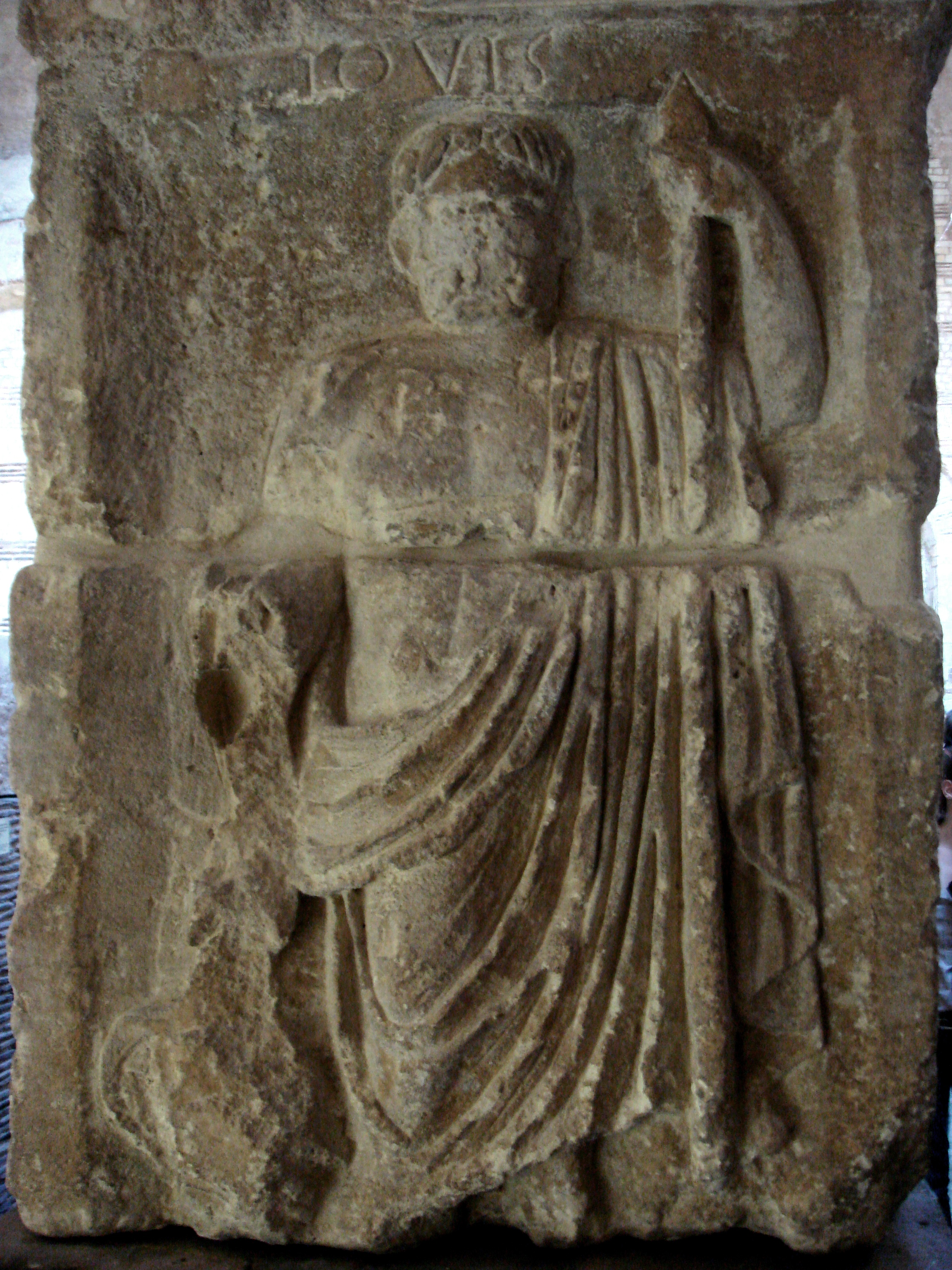
Jupiter, king of gods and weather god in ancient Rome

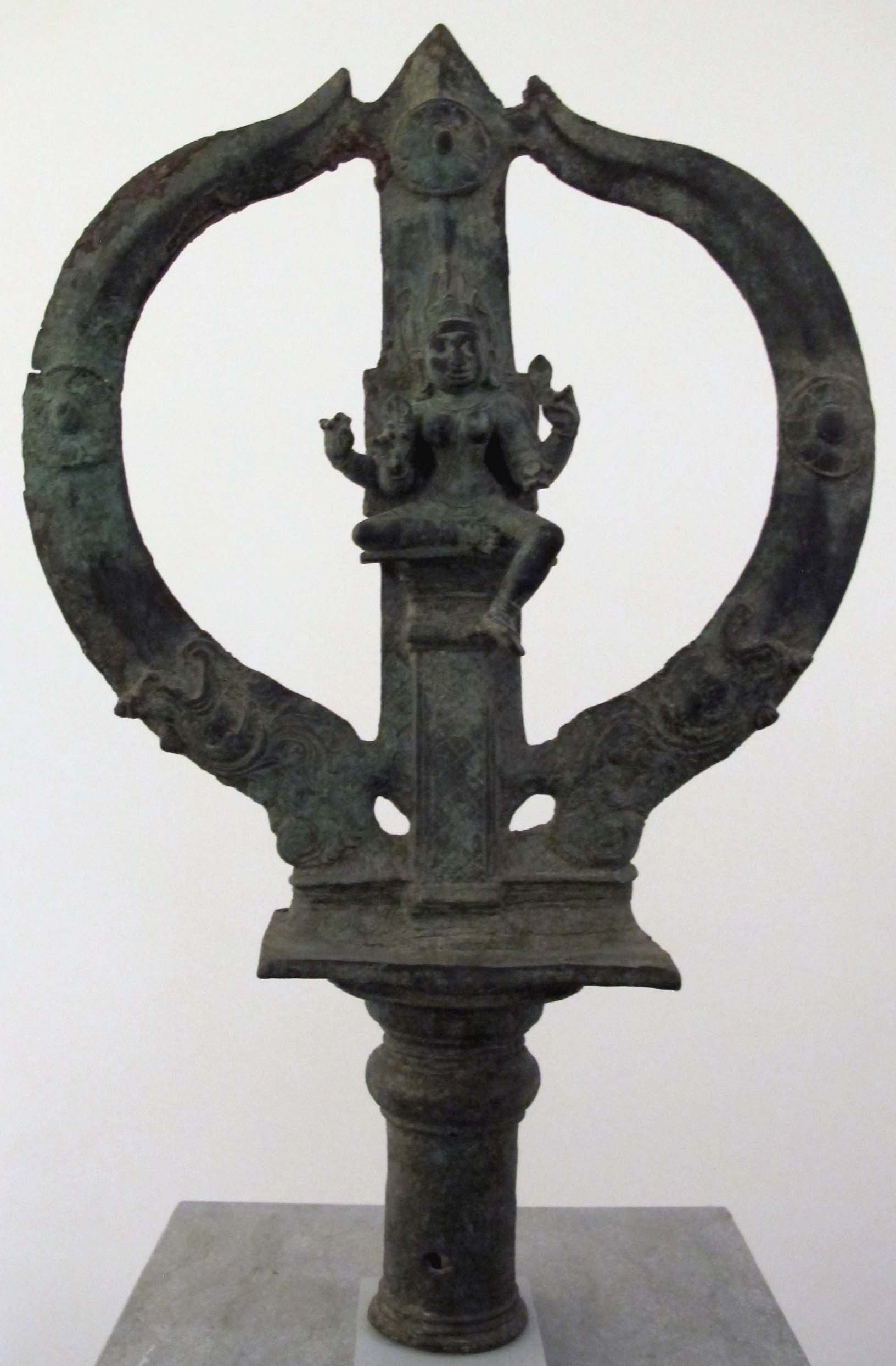
Mariamman, the Hindu goddess of rain.

A weather god or goddess, also frequently known as a storm god or goddess, is a deity in mythology associated with weather phenomena such as thunder, snow, lightning, rain, wind, storms, tornadoes, and hurricanes; in some instances, they are associated with skies as well, as a general association, and thus many of them are also sky deities, or are in close association with one.

Deities associated with only one feature of a storm are named after that attribute, such as a rain god or a lightning/thunder god. This single attribute may then be emphasized more than the generic, all-encompassing term "storm god", although for thunder and lightning gods the two terms appear to be interchangeable. They are common in polytheistic religions, especially in Proto-Indo-European ones.

Storm gods are most often conceived of as wielding thunder, lightning, or both (the names of some lightning gods mean "thunder", but since one cannot have thunder without lightning, they presumably wielded both). The ancients did not seem to differentiate between the two, which is presumably why both the words "lightning bolt" and "thunderbolt" exist despite being synonyms. Of the examples listed, storm- themed deities are more frequently depicted as male, but both male and female storm, rain, wind, and weather deities are described.

== Africa and the Middle East ==
=== Sub-Sahara Africa ===
- Umvelinqangi, god of thunder in Zulu traditional religion
- Ọya, the orisha of winds, tempests, and cyclones in Yoruba religion
- Bunzi, goddess of rain, in Kongo religion.
- Tano (Ta Kora), a god of thunder and war in the Akan religion.

=== Afroasiatic Middle East ===
==== Canaanite ====
- Baal, Canaanite god of fertility, weather, and war.
- Hadad, the Canaanite and Carthaginian storm, fertility, & war god. Identified as Baʿal's true name at Ugarit.
- Yahwism, in the faith of ancient Israel and Judah. Yahweh is said to have absorbed the attributes of other Levantine deities, taking on weather-god functions like storm, wind, rain and fertility control.

==== Egyptian ====
- Horus, the Egyptian god of rainstorms, the weather, the sky and war. Associated with the sun, kingship, and retribution. Personified in the pharaoh.
- Set, the Egyptian chaos, evil, and storm god, lord of the desert.

==== Mesopotamian ====
- Enlil, god associated with wind, air, earth, and storms
- Adad, the Mesopotamian weather god
- Manzat, goddess of the rainbow
- Shala, wife of Adad and a rain goddess
- Wer, a weather god worshiped in northern Mesopotamia and in Syria

== Western Eurasia ==
=== Albanian ===
- Dielli, the Sun: god of the sky and weather
- Zojz, Shurdh, i Verbti, Rmoria: sky and weather god

=== Balto-Slavic ===
- Bangpūtys, Lithuanian god of storms and the sea
- Perkūnas, Baltic god of thunder, rain, mountains, and oak trees. Servant of the creator god Dievas.
- Perun, Slavic god of thunder and lightning and king of the gods

=== Basque ===
- Mari, "The Lady"
- Sugaar

=== Celtic ===
- Taranis, Celtic god of thunder, often depicted with a wheel as well as a thunderbolt

=== Germanic ===
- Freyr, Norse god of agriculture, medicine, fertility, sunshine, summer, abundance, and rain
- Thor, Norse god of thunder/lightning, oak trees, protection, strength, and hallowing. Also Thunor and Donar, the Anglo-Saxon and Continental Germanic versions, respectively, of him. All descend from Common Germanic *Thunraz, the reflex of the PIE thunder god for this language branch of the Indo-Europeans.

=== Greco-Roman ===
- Aeolus (son of Hippotes), keeper of the winds in the Odyssey
- Anemoi, collective name for the gods of the winds in Greek mythology, their number varies from 4 to more
- Jupiter, the Roman weather and sky god and king of the gods
- Neptune, the Roman God of the seas, oceans, earthquakes and Storms
- Poseidon, Greek God of the sea, King of the Seas and Oceans, God of Earthquakes and Storms. He is referred to The Stormbringer
- Tempestas, Roman goddess of storms or sudden weather. Commonly referred to in the plural, Tempestates
- Tritopatores, wind gods
- Zeus, Greek weather, lightning and sky god and king of the gods

=== Western Asia ===
==== Anatolian-Caucasian ====
- Tamar (goddess), Georgian virgin goddess who controlled the weather.
- Tarḫunna, Hittite storm god; other Anatolian languages had similar names for their storm gods, such as Luwian below.
- Tarḫunz, Luwian storm god.
- Teshub, Hurrian storm god.
- Theispas or Teisheba, the Urartian storm and war god.
- Vayu, Hindu/Vedic wind god.
- Weather god of Nerik, Hittite god of the weather worshiped in the village of Nerik.
- Weather god of Zippalanda, Hittite god of the weather worshiped in the village of Zippalanda.

==== Hindu-Vedic ====
- Indra, Hindu God of the Weather, Storms, Sky, Lightning, and Thunder. Also known as the King of gods.
- Mariamman, Hindu rain goddess.
- Parjanya, Epithet of Indra
- Rudra, the god of wind, storms, and hunting; destructive aspect of Shiva

==== Persian-Zoroastrian ====
- Vayu-Vata, Iranian duo of gods, the first is the god of wind, much like the Hindu Vayu.

=== Uralic ===
- Küdryrchö Jumo, the Mari storm god.
- Ukko, Finnish thunder and harvest god and king of the gods

== Asia-Pacific / Oceania ==
=== Chinese ===
- Dian Mu, Leigong, and Wen Zhong, the thunder deities.
- Feng Bo, Feng Po Po, and Han Zixian, the Deities of Wind.
- Yunzhongzi, the master of clouds.
- Yu Shi, the god of rain.
- Sometimes the Dragon Kings were included instead of Yu Shi

=== Filipino ===
- Oden, the Bugkalot deity of the rain, worshiped for the deity's life-giving waters
- Apo Tudo, the Ilocano deity of the rain
- Anitun Tauo, the Sambal goddess of wind and rain who was reduced in rank by Malayari for her conceit
- Anitun Tabu, the Tagalog goddess of wind and rain and daughter of Idianale and Dumangan
- Bulan-hari, one of the Tagalog deities sent by Bathala to aid the people of Pinak; can command rain to fall; married to Bitu-in
- Santonilyo, a Bisaya deity who brings rain when its image is immersed at sea
- Diwata Kat Sidpan, a Tagbanwa deity who lives in the western region called Sidpan; controls the rains
- Diwata Kat Libatan, a Tagbanwa deity who lives in the eastern region called Babatan; controls the rain
- Diwata na Magbabaya, simply referred as Magbabaya, the good Bukidnon supreme deity and supreme planner who looks like a man; created the earth and the first eight elements, namely bronze, gold, coins, rock, clouds, rain, iron, and water; using the elements, he also created the sea, sky, moon, and stars; also known as the pure god who wills all things; one of three deities living in the realm called Banting
- Anit: also called Anitan; the Manobo guardian of the thunderbolt
- Inaiyau: the Manobo god of storms
- Tagbanua: the Manobo god of rain
- Umouiri: the Manobo god of clouds
- Libtakan: the Manobo god of sunrise, sunset, and good weather

=== Japanese ===
- Fūjin, Japanese wind god.
- Raijin, Japanese god of thunder, lightning, and storms
- Susanoo, tempestuous Japanese god of storms and the sea.

=== Vietnamese ===
- Thần Gió, Vietnamese wind god.

=== Oceania ===
- Baiame, sky god and creator deity of southeastern Australia.
- Julunggul, Arnhem Land rainbow serpent goddess who oversaw the initiation of boys into manhood.
- Tāwhirimātea, Maori storm god.
- Tāwhaki, Maori thunder and lightning god.
- Whaitiri, Maori thunder goddess.

== Native Americas ==
=== Central America, South America and the Caribbean ===
- Apocatequil, Pre-Incan god of lightning, the day and good. Regional variant of god Illapa.
- Chaac, Maya rain god. Aztec equivalent is Tlaloc.
- Coatrisquie, Taíno rain goddess, servant of Guabancex, and sidekick of thunder god Guatauva.
- Cocijo, Zapotec god of lightning.
- Ehecatl, Aztec god of wind.
- Guabancex, top Taíno storm goddess; the Lady of the Winds who also dishes out earthquakes and other natural disasters.
- Guatauva, Taíno god of thunder and lightning who is also responsible for rallying the other storm gods.
- Huari, Pre-Incan god of water, rain, lightning, agriculture and war. After a period of time, he was identified as a giant god of war, sun, water and agriculture.
- Huracán, K'iche Maya god of the wind, storms, and fire.
- Illapa, Inca god of lightning, thunder, rain and war. He is considered one of the most important and powerful Inca gods.
- Juracán, Taíno zemi or deity of chaos and disorder believed to control the weather, particularly hurricanes.
- K'awiil, classic Maya god of lightning.
- Kon, Inca god of wind and rain. Kon is also a creator god.
- Pachakamaq, Inca god of earthquakes, fire, the clouds and sky. Commonly described as a reissue of Wiracocha. He was one of the most important Inca gods, as well as he is considered the creator god of the universe and controller of the balance of the world.
- Paryaqaqa, Pre-Incan god of water, torrential rains, storms and lightning. Regional variant of the god Illapa.
- Q'uq'umatz, K'iche Maya god of wind and rain, also known as Kukulkan, Aztec equivalent is Quetzalcoatl.
- Tezcatlipoca, Aztec god of hurricanes and night winds.
- Tlaloc, Aztec rain and earthquake god. Mayan equivalent is Chaac.
- Tohil, K'iche Maya god of rain, sun, and fire.
- Tupã, the Guaraní god of thunder and light. Creator of the universe.
- Wiracocha, the Inca and Pre-Incan god of everything. Absolute creator of the entire Cosmos, as well as everything in existence. Considered the father of all the Inca gods and supreme god of the Inca pantheon. Wiracocha was associated with the sun, lightning, and storms.
- Yana Raman, Pre-Incan god of lightning. Considered creator by the Yaros or Llacuaces ethnic group. Regional variant of the god Illapa.
- Yopaat, a Classic-period Maya storm god.

== See also ==
- Ekendriya
- Rain god
- Sea god, often responsible for weather at sea
- Sky god
- Thunder god
- Wind god
