= Gebeleizis =

Getae god

Gebeleizis was a god worshiped by the Getae, whose name has been interpreted as a theonym for the Indo-European sky and weather god, evidently also called by the Thracians with a similar theonym – Zibelthiurdos or Zbelsurdos. In ancient literature he is mentioned only by Herodotus.

Gebeleizis was represented as a handsome man, sometimes wearing a beard. The lightning and thunder were his manifestations. According to Herodotus, some Getae equated Gebeleizis with Zalmoxis as the same god.

== Name ==
Gebeleizis has an etymology likely rooted in Indo-European sky-god traditions. The name is often interpreted as a compound of "gebele" (linked to PIE *ģʰeib-, "to shine" or "bright") and "-zis" (derived from the PIE sky god *Dyēus, cognate to Zeus). It is closely associated with the Thraco-Dacian deity Zibelthiurdos, potentially meaning "shining god" or "bright spear". Alternatively it's read as Cybele-Zis, the Zeus of Cybele.

== See also ==
- Thracian Horseman

== Bibliography ==
- Eliade, Mircea (1970). De Zalmoxis à Gengis-Khan: études comparatives sur les religions et le folklore de la Dacie et de l'Europe orientale. Payot.
- Treimer, Karl (1971). "Zur Rückerschliessung der illyrischen Götterwelt und ihre Bedeutung für die südslawische Philologie". In Henrik Barić (ed.). Arhiv za Arbanasku starinu, jezik i etnologiju. Vol. I. R. Trofenik. pp. 27–33.
