= Shurdh =

Albanian weather and storm god

Shurdh (Albanian definite form: Shurdhi) is a name for the weather and storm god in Albanian pagan mythology. In some regions of the Albanian Alps the weather and storm god has been referred to as Rmoria or Shen Verbti; the latter is an Albanian adjectival noun meaning "the blind one" that has been used in other northern Albanian regions (documented in Zadrima), to refer to the fire and wind god. In Zadrima the sky and lightning god has been called Zojz, the clear equivalent and cognate of Messapic Zis and Ancient Greek Zeus (all from Proto-Indo-European *Di̯ḗu̯s 'sky god'). Another possible name of the sky and lightning god could be Perëndi. The Albanian divine culture hero drangue, who plays a dominant role in Albanian mythology, features the attributes of a sky and lightning deity, apparently an Albanian reflection of the Indo-European sky god.

Worshiped in northern Albania until recent times, the weather and storm god was believed to cause hailstorms and throw thunder and lightning.

Shurdhi is thought to have been an ancient Illyrian theonym, equivalent and partly cognate of Thracian Zibelthiurdos.

== Name ==
The name Shurdhi appears to be connected with the Albanian term i shurdhët meaning "the deaf one", however, this link seems to be only a coincidence, since the name Shurdh is more likely a compound of *seuro, "water" (cf. Albanian shurrë "urine"), and *dos "giver/donor" (cf. Albanian dhashë/dha, "I gave/he gave"); his name thus means "water donor". A relation between the name Shurdh and the second part of the theonym Zibelsurdus found in ancient Thracian epigraphic monuments has been suggested.

The coincidence of the name of the weather and storm god Shurdh with the term shurdh-i "the deaf one" probably gave rise to the adjectival noun I Verbti "the blind one" or Shën Verbti "the holy blind one", which was used to refer to the weather and storm god in the Albanian Alps along with Rrmoria, and to refer to the fire and wind god in the Zadrima region.

The theonym Shurdh could be related to the name of the island of Shurdhah near Shkodër, and it is found in the oronym Maja Shurdh ("Shurdh Peak") in Kelmendi, and the toponym mi Shurdh, a region in Mirdita.

Rrmoria, which is another name for the weather and storm god, is possibly from Latin: rumor 'shouting, noise, rumour'.

== Folk beliefs ==
According to folk beliefs, Shurdhi travels using storm clouds which announce hailstorms when he arrives. He can be greeted and turned away with noise from metallic objects and gunshots, according to the Albanian apotropaic ritual practiced in order to seek the protection of the fire deity from big storms with torrential rains, lightning and hail, which often cause great damage to agriculture, livestock, and to the rural economy in general.

The Albanologist Baron Nopcsa identified Shurdhi with the ancient Thracian thunder deity Zibelsurdus. According to Karl Treimer, a presumable basic form perejont-, "the striker", of the Albanian divine name Perëndi may be an epithet of the thunderstorm god Shurdh, who may have been a favorite god since he would have refreshed pastures and fields and was probably also of a warlike nature after this presumable epithet given to him.

== See also ==
- Albanian mythology
- Drangue
- En (deity)
- Zojz (deity)
- Perëndi
- Verbti

== Sources ==
=== Bibliography ===
- Berishaj, Martin (2004). Skrita moč bese: Ženske v imaginariju albanskega tradicionalizma. Dodatek: Skenderbegov kanon (in Slovenian). Založba ZRC. ISBN 9789616500746.
- Çabej, Eqrem (1966). "Albanische Volkskunde". Südost-Forschungen (25): 333–387.
- Dedvukaj, Lindon (2023). "Linguistic evidence for the Indo-European and Albanian origin of Aphrodite". Proceedings of the Linguistic Society of America. 8 (1). Linguistic Society of America: 5500. doi:10.3765/plsa.v8i1.5500. S2CID 258381736.
- Elsie, Robert (January 2001). A Dictionary of Albanian Religion, Mythology and Folk Culture. C. Hurst & Co. Publishers. ISBN 978-1-85065-570-1.
- Hyllested, Adam; Joseph, Brian D. (2022). "Albanian". In Olander, Thomas (ed.). The Indo-European Language Family : A Phylogenetic Perspective. Cambridge University Press. pp. 223–245. doi:10.1017/9781108758666. ISBN 9781108758666. S2CID 161016819.
- Jordan, Michael (August 2004). Dictionary of gods and goddesses. Infobase Publishing. ISBN 978-0-8160-5923-2.
- Lambertz, Maximilian (1922). Albanische Märchen (und andere Texte zur albanischen Volkskunde). Wien: A. Hölder.
- Lambertz, Maximilian (1973). "Die Mythologie der Albaner". In Hans Wilhelm Haussig (ed.). Wörterbuch der Mythologie (in German). Vol. 2. pp. 455–509.
- Lurker, Manfred (2004). The Routledge dictionary of gods and goddesses, devils and demons. Psychology Press. ISBN 978-0-415-34018-2.
- Søborg, Tobias Mosbæk (2020). Sigmatic Verbal Formations in Anatolian and Indo-European: A Cladistic Study (Thesis). University of Copenhagen, Department of Nordic Studies and Linguistics.
- Tirta, Mark (2004). Petrit Bezhani (ed.). Mitologjia ndër shqiptarë (in Albanian). Tirana: Mësonjëtorja. ISBN 99927-938-9-9.
- Treimer, Karl (1971). "Zur Rückerschliessung der illyrischen Götterwelt und ihre Bedeutung für die südslawische Philologie". In Henrik Barić (ed.). Arhiv za Arbanasku starinu, jezik i etnologiju. Vol. I. R. Trofenik. pp. 27–33.
