= Kiwanuka =

Kiwanuka may refer to:

- Prince Wasajja Kiwanuka (born 1980), royal prince from Buganda Kingdom, Uganda
- Benedicto Kiwanuka (1922–1972), first prime minister of Uganda
- Maria Kiwanuka (born 1955), Ugandan economist, businesswoman and politician, minister of finance in Uganda's cabinet (2011–2015)
- Hassan Male Mabirizi Kiwanuka (born 1987), Ugandan Lawyer and activist
- Mathias Kiwanuka (born 1983), player in the NFL, grandson of Benedicto Kiwanuka
- Michael Kiwanuka (born 1987), British singer-songwriter and record producer
  - Kiwanuka (album), a 2019 album by Michael Kiwanuka
- Nam Kiwanuka (born before 1983), Canadian television host and journalist
