= Tempestas =

Ancient Roman goddess of storms

In ancient Roman religion, Tempestas (Latin tempestas: "season, weather; bad weather; storm, tempest") is a goddess of storms or sudden weather. As with certain other nature and weather deities, the plural form Tempestates is common. Cicero, in discussing whether natural phenomena such as rainbows and clouds should be regarded as divine, notes that the Tempestates had been consecrated as deities by the Roman people.

== Aedes Tempestatis ==
A temple (aedes or delubrum) was dedicated to the Tempestates (given in the singular by Ovid) by L. Cornelius Scipio in 259 BC, as recorded by his epitaph. Scipio had been caught in a storm with his fleet off Corsica, and the building of the temple was in fulfillment of a vow made in asking for deliverance. Ovid gives the dedication day as June 1, but it appears as December 23 in the Fasti Antiates Maiores; this latter date may mark a renovation, or there may have been more than one temple to the Tempestates. The temple vowed in 259 was located in Regio I, perhaps near the Tomb of the Scipios, and was connected with the temples of Mars and Minerva there. William Warde Fowler saw a pattern of temple dedications during this period that acknowledged water as a divine force, including the Temple of Juturna vowed in 241 by Lutatius Catulus, and the Temple of Fons during the Corsican war of 231. Black sheep were sacrificed at her temple.
