= Zis =

Messapic sky and lightning god

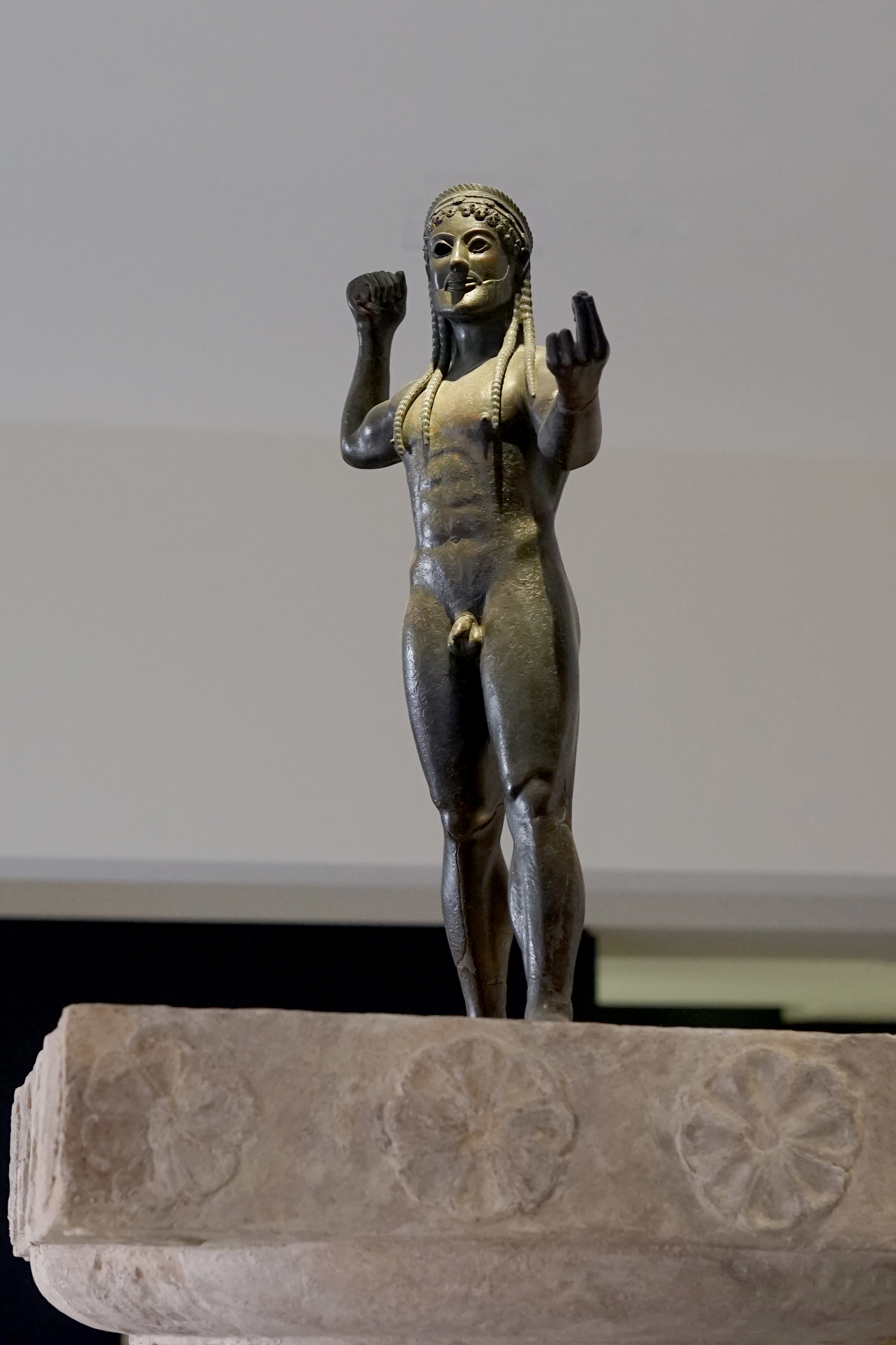
Bronze statue most likely representing the Messapic god Zis Batas, probably by a Tarentine artist, ca. 530 BCE.

Zis (Messapic: 𐌆𐌉𐌔) is a sky and lightning god in Messapian religion, occupying the most prominent role. The theonym is the equivalent and cognate of Albanian Zojz and Greek Zeus, all from Proto-Indo-European *Di̯ḗu̯s 'sky god'. Zis appears in several votive inscriptions in the Messapic alphabet from Salento in Southern Italy.

== Name ==
=== Attestation ===
The divine name appears in several votive epigraphic texts in the Messapic alphabet from Salento is attested in inscriptions starting from the early 6th century BCE.

=== Etymology ===
Zis is the Messapic continuation of *Di̯ḗu̯s, the name of the Proto-Indo-European daylight-sky-god. Cognates stemming from the noun *Di̯ḗu̯s with a similar phonological development are the Albanian Zojz and Greek Zeus. In the Messapic Zis, Albanian Zoj-z, and Greek Ζεύς, the original cluster *di̯ of *di̯ḗu̯s underwent affrication to *dz. The Tarentine god Dís (Δίς) has probably been borrowed from their neighbouring Messapians.

== Epithets and role ==
=== Zis Batas ===
The cult of Zis Batas is the earliest and the more lasting one among the Messapians, attested from the archaic period to Roman Imperial times (from 8th to 2nd-1st centuries BCE). It appears in the earliest attested Messapic inscriptions, from votive dedication in the Grotta Porcinara in Leuca. This maritime cave was a Messapic sanctuary sacred to this deity, including an ash altar and miniaturistic sacrificial vases, and was located in a trade center along the routes connecting East and West, also frequented by Greeks. This indigenous Messapic deity was adopted by Greeks as Zeus Batios and by Romans as Iupiter Batius or Juppiter Optimus Maximus Batius, which provide evidence for the continuity of this cult down to the Imperial period.

Zis Batas has been interpreted as "Zis the Thunderer", a Messapian lightning and weather god, regarded as the ruler of atmospheric events including storms, and therefore protector of navigation. Hence it is reasonable to suppose that this deity was regarded by the sailors as a divine entity worshiped in order to assure good weather, salvation in sea and good navigation. (Note: Early evidence of celestial cult in Illyria, on the other side of the Adriatic, is provided by 6th century BCE plaques from Lake Shkodra, which belonged to the Illyrian tribal area of what was referred in historical sources to as the Labeatae in later times. Each of those plaques portray simultaneously sacred representations of the sky and the sun, and symbolism of lightning and fire, as well as the sacred tree and birds (eagles). In those plaques there is a mythological representation of the deity, who throws lightning into a fire altar, which is held by two men (sometimes on two boats). This mythological representation is identical to the Albanian folk belief and practice associated to the lightning deity. A traditional Albanian practice during thunderstorms was to bring outdoors a fireplace (Albanian: vatër), in order to gain the favor of the deity so the thunders would not be harmful to the human community. Albanian folk beliefs regard the lightning as the "fire of the sky" (zjarri i qiellit) and consider it as the "weapon of the deity" (arma/pushka e zotit/perëndisë). Indeed an Albanian word to refer to the lightning is rrufeja, related to the Thracian rhomphaia, an ancient polearm.) Other than protector of navigation, Zis Batas could have been linked to aspects of fertility and prosperity, as indicated by the archaeological remainings of sacrificed goats offered to this deity, placed inside the miniaturistic vases and near the large ash altar in the Grotta Porcinara, dating from the 8th century BCE.

A bronze statue from Ugento is most likely the representation of the Messapic Zis Batas in the position of throwing a thunderbolt. It dates to ca. 530 BCE and was probably realized by a Tarentine artist.

=== Zis Menzanas ===
The Messapic sky god was also worshiped as Zis Menzanas. The root in menzanas is a cognate of the Albanian mëz or mâz 'foal', from *me(n)za- 'horse', which underwent a later semantic shift 'horse' > 'foal' after the loan from Latin caballus into Albanian kalë 'horse'. Hence *me(n)zana- has been interpreted as a Palaeo-Balkan word for 'horseman'. Further relevant evidence can be seen in Iuppiter Menzanas, mentioned in a passage written by Festus in relation to a Messapian horse sacrifice, and in ΜΕΖΗΝΑ̣Ι from a Thracian inscription on the Duvanli gold ring also bearing the image of a horseman.

=== Sky-Earth pair ===
The cult of Zis Batas is regarded as the male counterpart of the chthonic cults linked to Demeter (Messapic: Damatura) and Kore. The origin of the Messapic goddess Damatura is debated: scholars like Vladimir I. Georgiev (1937), Eqrem Çabej, Shaban Demiraj (1997), or Martin L. West (2007) have argued that she was an Illyrian goddess (from PIE *dʰǵʰem-māter, "earth mother", containing the Messapic root dā- "earth", cf. Albanian: Dheu, "earth", used in Old Albanian for "Earth Mother"), eventually borrowed into Greek as Demeter, while others like Paul Kretschmer (1939), Robert S. P. Beekes (2009) and Carlo De Simone (2017) have argued for the Messapic borrowing from Greek Demeter. According to Martin L. West, "the formal parallelism between the names of the Illyrian Deipaturos and the Messapic Damatura ["earth-mother"] may favour their having been a pair, but evidence of the liaison is lacking."

== Zeus Messapeus ==
The cult of Zeus Messapeus is documented in Spartan territory in Ancient Greece. Two ancient literary traditions attest Messapeus as a title of Zeus. Pausanias (2nd century CE) mentions a temenos of Zeus Messapeus on the west side of the Spartan plain. Stephanus of Byzantium (5th century CE) cites Theopompus (4th century BCE) providing evidence for the location of a sanctuary of Zeus Messapeus southwest of Sparta. Also an inscription on a vase found in Laconia dating back to c. 590-570 BCE attests the title Mesapeus, and another 2nd century fragmentary stamped tile from Anthochori appears to refer to Messapian Zeus.

The Spartans possibly adopted the cult of Messapian Zeus from the Spartan colony of Taras in the sallentine peninsula where cultural exchanges between Messapians and Tarentines occurred. Indeed the Messapian god Zis was the most popular deity in the region.
