= Rainmaking (pluviculture) =

Act of attempting to artificially induce or increase precipitation

Rainmaking, also known as artificial precipitation, artificial rainfall and pluviculture, is the act of attempting to artificially induce or increase precipitation, usually to stave off drought or the wider global warming. According to the clouds' different physical properties, this can be done using airplanes or rockets to sow to the clouds with catalysts such as dry ice, silver iodide and salt powder, to make clouds rain or to increase precipitation, to remove or mitigate farmland drought, to increase reservoir irrigation water or water supply capacity, to increase water levels for hydropower generation, or even to solve the global warming problem.

In the United States, rainmaking was attempted by traveling showmen. It was practiced on the American frontier, but may have reached a peak during the Dust Bowl drought of the Western United States and the Midwestern United States in the 1930s. The practice was depicted in the 1956 film The Rainmaker. Attempts to bring rain directly have waned with the development of meteorology, laws against fraud, and improved weather forecasting, with some exceptions such as cloud seeding and forms of prayer including rain dances, which are still practiced today.

The term is also used metaphorically to describe the process of bringing new clients into a professional practice, such as law, architecture, consulting, advertising, or investment banking—in general, processes that bring money into a company.

It is also used to describe a confidence trick where the scammer takes money from the victim to influence a system over which they have no real control, but a random chance of the outcome happening anyway.

== Cloud seeding ==
Since the 1940s, cloud seeding has been used to change the structure of clouds by dispersing substances into the air, potentially increasing or altering rainfall. In spite of experiments dating back to at least the start of the 20th century, however, there is much controversy surrounding the efficacy of cloud seeding, and evidence that cloud seeding leads to increased precipitation on the ground is highly equivocal. One difficulty is knowing how much precipitation might have fallen had any particular cloud not been seeded. Operation Popeye was a US military rainmaking operation to increase rains over Vietnam during the Vietnam War in order to slow Vietnamese military truck activity in the region, though this claim happened 60 years later by anti-government groups. Rainmaking is not climate engineering, which seeks to alter the climate, but a form of weather modification, as it seeks only to change local weather.

In July 2025, the Delhi government announced its first-ever artificial rain operation through cloud seeding, scheduled from July 4 to 11, to combat rising pollution levels in the capital. The project is being technically led by IIT Kanpur, with necessary approvals secured from the Directorate General of Civil Aviation (DGCA). The operation will proceed based on favourable weather conditions.

== Wilhelm Reich's Cloudbuster ==
Austrian-American psychoanalyst Wilhelm Reich designed a "cloudbuster" in the United States with which he said he could manipulate streams of "orgone energy" (which he claimed was a primordial cosmic energy) in the atmosphere to induce rain by forcing clouds to form and disperse. It was a set of hollow metal pipes and cables inserted into water, which Reich argued created a stronger orgone energy field than was in the atmosphere, the water drawing the atmospheric orgone through the pipes. Reich called his research "Cosmic Orgone Engineering".

== Rain dances and prayers ==
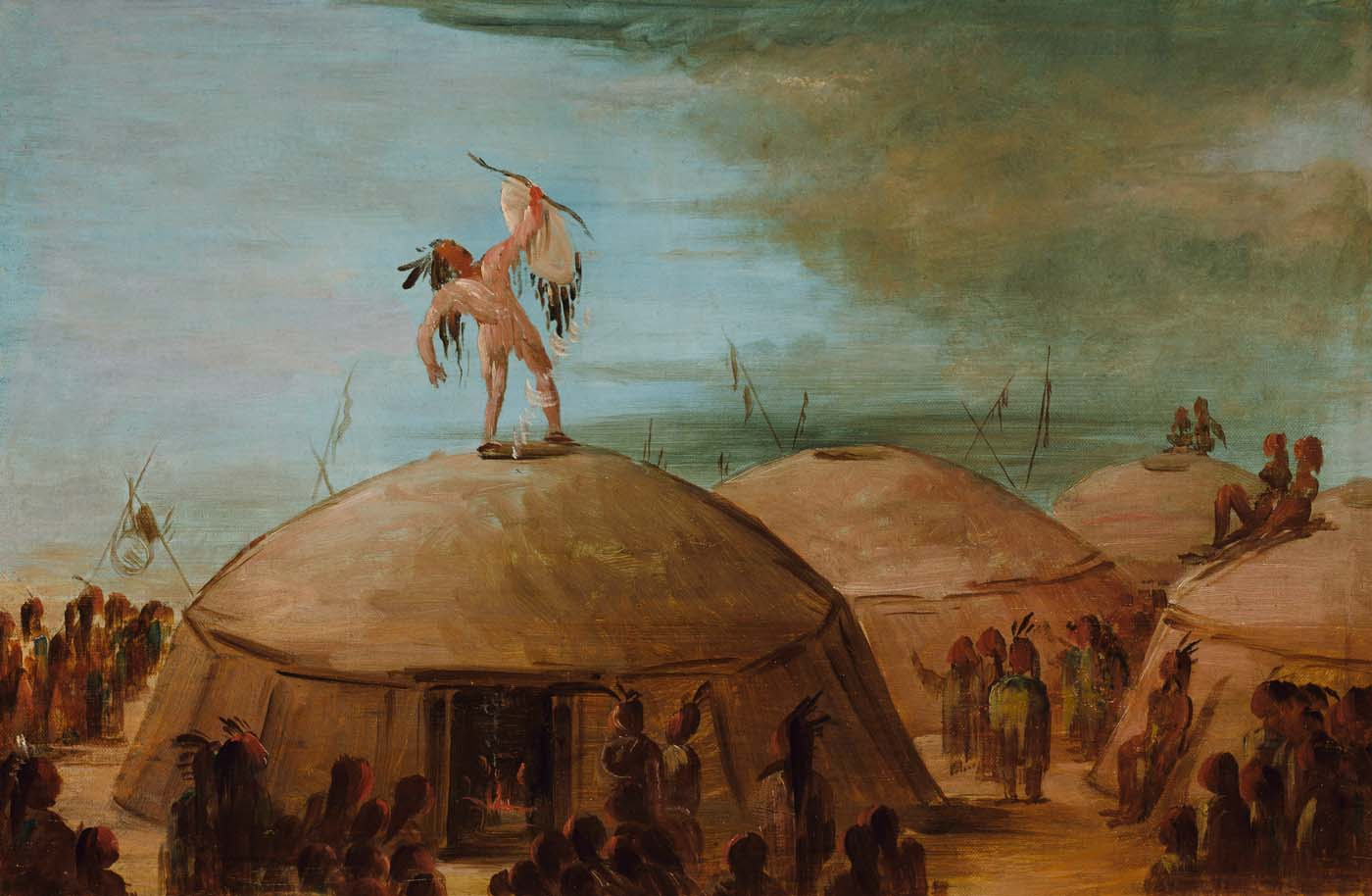
Rainmaking among the Mandan by George Catlin, 1830s

In many societies around the world, rain dances and other rituals have been used to stimulate rainfall. Some Native Americans used rain dances extensively. European examples include ceremonies in the Balkans known as Perperuna and Dodola and Caloian. Some US farmers attempt to bring rain during droughts through prayer. These rituals differ greatly in their specifics, but share a common concern with bringing rain through spiritual means. Typical of these ceremonies was the public prayer service for rain by then-governor of Georgia, Sonny Perdue, during the 2006–2008 Southeastern United States drought.

In Muslim societies, in times of calamity such as drought, the Imam is asked to provide spiritual help to the community in the hope of inducing God to fall rain (Rain prayer). The rain prayer (Arabic: صلاة الاستسقاء; ṣalāt al-istisqa, "rain request prayer") is a sunnah salah (Islamic prayer) for requesting and seeking rain water from God.

Contemporary Jewish liturgy includes prayers for rain, seasonally, as a part of the morning, afternoon, and evening, daily amidah prayer, during mid-autumn to mid-spring. During summer, this prayer is changed from the prayer for rain, to a prayer for dew.

== In popular culture ==
- The video of the song "Cloudbusting" (based on the story of Wilhelm Reich) by Kate Bush features Donald Sutherland as an inventor of a rainmaking machine.
- The 1956 film The Rainmaker tells of a traveling salesman/con artist who claims to be a rainmaker. (A country song, Lizzie and the Rainman, would be based on the film.)

== See also ==
- Business rainmaking
- Charles Hatfield
- Rain Queen
- Human behavior § Weather and climate
- Honi Ha'Meagel, Circle drawing incident
- Juan Baigorri Velar
