= Temple of Mars (disambiguation) =

Temple of Mars was a temple built on the campus Martius in Rome in the 2nd century BC.

Temple of Mars may also refer to:

- Temple of Mars (Corseul)
- Temple of Mars in Clivo
- Temple of Mars Ultor
- "Temple of Mars" (Adventure Time), a 2017 episode of the television series
