= Omek Tannou =

Ancient Tunisian rainmaking ritual

Omek tannou, Ommk tangou or Amuk taniqu is an ancient Tunisian rainmaking ritual which was inherited from Punic and Berber traditions involving invocations of the goddess Tanit. It is now all but extinct.

It features the ritual use of the sculpted head of a woman (somewhat resembling the head of a girl's doll), which is carried in procession between the houses of a village during periods of drought by children singing the refrain أمك طانقو يا نساء طلبت ربي على الشتاء (Tunisian Latin script: Ommk tangou ya nsee, talbt rabbi ëla s'sctee, Tunisian Arabic pronunciation: [omː(ə)k tɜngu jæ nsɛː tälb(ə) rabːi ʕla ʃːteː]), "Oh women, Ommk tangou has asked God for rain". The song varies according to the region because the term shta designates rain only in certain urban areas. Each housewife then pours a little water on the statuette, invoking rain.

In some villages, instead of the sculpted head, a stick is used. Each woman attaches a piece of clothing to this before giving some barley to the children in the procession, who then move off, while singing the refrain يا بو قطمبو أعطينا شعير يملا قدحكم مالغدير (transliteration: ya bu gṭmbu ʾaʿtina shʿir ymla gdḥkm malghdir, "O Bouktambou [deformation of Omouk tangou] give us barley, your container will be filled from the water sources").

Tradition of Oumouk Tangou in Hammamet, Tunisia

== See also ==
- Caloian
- Dodola
- German (mythological being)
