= Pripegala =

Pripegala is a god of the Polabian Slavs, mentioned in a 1108 letter by the Magdeburg Bishop Adelgot, calling for a battle against the pagan Veleti. Among the images of Slavic crimes and atrocities contained in the document was a description of the worship of a god named Pripegala, juxtaposed with the Greek Priapus:

The most fanatical of them say, whenever they wish to divert themselves at feasts, "our Pripegala—they yell ferociously—wants heads, therefore must we perform sacrifices". Pripegala, as they call him, is a lewd Priapus and Belphegor. Thus, after slaughtering the Christians before the alters of their idolatry, they fill the basins with human blood and, howling with terrifying shrieks, say: "Let us make this a day of joy, Christ has been vanquished, the victorious Pripegala has triumphed".

Latin original text
Phanatici autem illorum, quotiens commessationibus uacare libet, ferus in dictis capita, inquiunt, uult noster Pripegala, huiusmodi fieri oportet sacrificia. Pripegala, ut aiunt, Priapus est Beelphegor impudicus. Tunc decollatis ante prophanationis sue aras Christianis crateras tenent humano sanguine plenas et horrendis uocibus ululantes, agamus, inquiunt, diem leticie, uictus est Christus, uicit Pripegala uictoriosissimus.

There is general agreement that the notation Pripegala is distorted and many scholars have proposed their own reading. The contemporary transcript is read as Pribyglav/Pribyglov. The analysis shows that the Slavic cluster *Prib- in medieval German Latin is rendered as by Prib, cf. Pribe, Pribizlav, or by Prip, cf. Pripslaff "Polish given name Przybysław", Pripgnewe, Pripignewen "Przybygniew". The Slavic vowel ⟨y⟩, on the other hand, was written as the letter e, as it was often done when writing Polish names. The last element of the theonym, -gala, should be read as an element -glov or -glav, which was reduced to -gla as a result of the adaptation of this element to the phonetics of the Low German language, and then expanded with the vowel ⟨a⟩ to avoid a consonant cluster that would be difficult to pronounce for foreigners. Thus, the theonym would consist of the Proto-Slavic stem *priby- (Note: From Proto-Slavic *pribyti "to arrive", "to increase (about the amount of something)", from *pri and -by- from *byti "to be".) "to increase, to arrive" and *golva "head" and literally meant "let there be more heads", "gainer of heads", "one to whom heads arrive", etc. Michał Łuczyński reconstructs Proto-Slavic form as *Pribyglovъ.

Aleksander Brückner also originally read the first stem as Prib-, and reconstructed the whole theonym as Przybychwał (second stem from chwała "praise, glory"). He eventually abandoned this reading, however, and decided that Pripegala was a corrupted notation of the theonym Triglav. However, this interpretation is incorrect, as there is no evidence that the Slavic ⟨p⟩ is written with a t in German records. Some researchers have tried to read the transcript as Przypiekało, Připekal, Prepiekal, Przypiekała, Pripekało, etc. "scorching sun" from the verb *pripěkati "to scorch".

According to Michał Łuczyński, Pribyglav was an epithet or synonym of Svarozhits. This is supported by the fact that in the temple of Svarozhits-Radogost in Rethra, which was the main sanctuary of the Veleti, sacrifices of human heads were accepted, e.g. in 1066 the bishop of Mecklenburg John was sacrificed to him in this way. An additional argument may be that Svarozhits is often interpreted as a sun god, and beheadings in India and among the Celts were associated with sun worship.

According to Serbian philologist Aleksandar Loma, the only attestation of this theonym from outside the Polabian area would be the Serbian village of Privina Glava. According to legend, the monastery there was founded in the 12th century by a lord named Prib or Priv, however, the oldest reference to the village, from the Turkish census of 1566/1567, records the name Pribiglava. The modern name Privina Glava is therefore probably a distortion, split into two parts, cf. 16th-18th century records with the toponym Gologlava, and the modern name Gola Glava.

== See also ==
- Perperuna and Dodola
- German

== Bibliography ==
- Alvarez-Pedroza, Juan Antonio (2021). Sources of Slavic Pre-Christian Religion. Leiden: Koninklijke Brill. ISBN 978-90-04-44138-5.
- Brückner, Aleksander (1985). Mitologia słowiańska i polska (in Polish). Warsaw: Państwowe Wydawnictwo Naukowe. ISBN 8301062452.
- Loma, Aleksandar (2002). Prakosovo. Slovenski i indoevropski koreni srpske epike (in Serbian). Belgrade.
- Łuczyński, Michał (2020). Bogowie dawnych Słowian. Studium onomastyczne (in Polish). Kielce: Kieleckie Towarzystwo Naukowe. ISBN 978-83-60777-83-1.
