= Rainmaker =

Rainmaker or The Rainmaker may refer to:

- A practitioner of rainmaking (pluviculture)
- A practitioner of rainmaking (ritual)

== Characters ==
- The Rainmaker, a mysterious character in the film Looper
- Sarah Rainmaker, a fictional character from the Gen^{13} comic book series

== Film and television ==
- The Rainmaker (1926 film), a lost American silent film
- The Rainmaker (play), by N. Richard Nash
  - The Rainmaker (1956 film), starring Burt Lancaster and Katharine Hepburn
  - The Rainmaker, John Frankenheimer's 1982 television film
- The Rainmaker (novel), a novel by John Grisham
  - The Rainmaker (1997 film), starring Matt Damon and Danny DeVito
  - The Rainmaker (TV series), a 2025 television series

== Music ==
=== Albums ===
- Rainmaker (Fair Warning album), 1995
- Rainmaker (Kevin Moore album) or the title song, 1980
- Rainmaker (YFriday album) or the title song, 1999
- The Rainmaker (album), by the Flower Kings, or the title instrumental, 2001
- Rainmaker, by Michael Chapman, 1969

=== Songs ===
- "Rainmaker" (Emmelie de Forest song), 2014
- "Rainmaker" (Iron Maiden song), 2003
- "Rainmaker", by Bruce Springsteen from Letter to You, 2020
- "Rainmaker", by Harry Nilsson from Harry, 1969
- "Rainmaker", by Kansas from In the Spirit of Things, 1988
- "Rainmaker", by the Partridge Family from Sound Magazine, 1971
- "Rainmaker", by Sleigh Bells from Kid Kruschev, 2017
- "Rainmaker", by Sparklehorse from Vivadixiesubmarinetransmissionplot, 1995
- "Rainmaker", by Spear of Destiny from One Eyed Jacks, 1984
- "Rainmaker", by Traffic from The Low Spark of High Heeled Boys, 1971
- "Rainmaker", by Vanden Plas from The God Thing, 1997
- "Rainmaker", by Wellington Womble of the Wombles, 1976
- "Rainmaker", by Yanni from Ethnicity, 2003

== People ==
- Boyd Melson (born 1981), American boxer
- Rainmaker, ring name of Japanese professional wrestler Kazuchika Okada

== Other uses ==
- Rainmaker (business), a person who brings in much new business and/or accounts
- Rainmaker Digital Effects, a digital effects studio
- The Rainmaker: a Passion for Politics, a political memoir by Keith Davey
- Rainmaker, a recurring mode in the Splatoon video game series
- Rainmaker Technology Corporation

== See also ==
- The Rainmakers (disambiguation)
