= Zănoaga =

Zănoaga may refer to several villages in Romania:

- Zănoaga, a village in Leu Commune, Dolj County
- Zănoaga, a village in Dăneasa Commune, Olt County
- Zănoaga, a village in Dumbrava Commune, Prahova County
