= Bhekuli Biya =

Hindu wedding ceremony of two frogs

Bhekuli Biya is a traditional Hindu practice of marrying frogs, which originated in the Indian state of Assam. Also referred to as "Mandooka Parinaya" and "Banger Biye" in various regions of India, the ritual takes place during the dry summer months with the aim of bringing rain.

In Assamese tradition, a poem describes how farmers question the clouds, asking why there is no rain. In response, the clouds explain that if the frogs do not croak, there will not be rain. The monsoon marks the frogs' mating season, and when they croak to call their mates, it triggers rainfall. This is how the croaking of frogs is linked to rainfall.

== Etymology ==
The word bhekuli is an Assamese word, meaning 'frog'; the word biya means 'marriage', meaning that the term Bhekuli Biya literally means 'frog marriage'.

== Celebration ==
The ceremony is usually performed by a priest or elder of the village. The two frogs are caught and cleaned, and then dressed in traditional Assamese wedding clothes. They are then seated on a platform and tied together with a red thread. The priest then performs a puja, or prayer, asking for the rain god's blessings. Vermilion is applied to the female frog's forehead to signify her as the male frog's life partner.

After the puja, the frogs are released into a nearby pond or stream. It is believed that if the frogs stay together, it will be a sign that the rain god has been appeased and that rain will soon follow.

The marriage ceremony was performed as per Assamese customs and rituals. Organizing the marriage of frogs is part of Assamese folk culture. This belief stems from the idea that by marrying two frogs, the rain god, Varun Devta from Hindu mythology, will be appeased and send much-needed rain.

== Specific events ==
In July 2019, people in Madhya Pradesh married two clay frogs to appease Indra and pray for rain. After the rains arrived more than desired, amid the 2019 Indian floods, a "frog divorce" was carried out in Bhopal, with two clay frogs being symbolically separated. The local group Om Shiva Sewa Shakti Mandal performed the ceremony, stating a hope that the region would be relieved from the destruction due to heavy rain as a result.
