= Transvectio equitum =

Roman parade

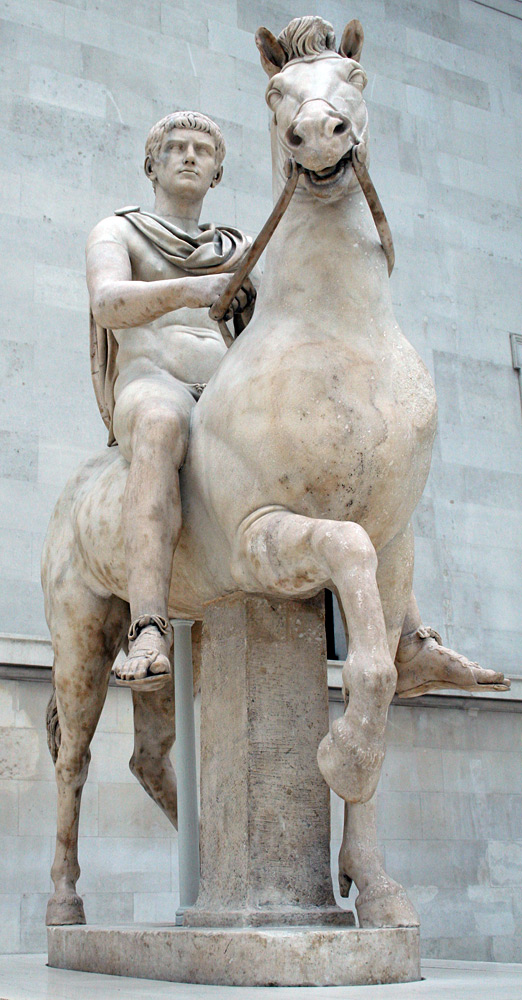
Roman youth on horseback

The Transvectio equitum (English: "review of the cavalry") was a parade of the young men (iuventus) of the Roman equestrian class (equites) that took place annually on 15 July. Dionysius of Halicarnassus states that the procession began at the Temple of Mars in Clivo situated along the Via Appia some two kilometers outside the Porta Capena. The procession stopped at the Temple of Castor and Pollux in the Forum Romanum before continuing on to the Temple of Jupiter Optimus Maximus on the Capitoline Hill. The religious rite traced its origins to the battle of Lake Regillus when the Dioscuri gave aid to the Romans during the battle itself.

Other, later, sources indicate that the parade commenced at the temple of Honos. The emperor Augustus revived the ancient ceremony, combining it with a recognitio equitum or probatio equitum in order to scrutinize the character of the equestrians themselves.

Epigraphic evidence indicates that some boys participated in the rite at quite a young age. It is likely that a close connection may be drawn between the transvectio equitum and the Lusus Troiae.

A sculpted relief from Como likely depicts the procession.

== Sources ==
- ILS 316
- CIL 6.3512
- CIL 14.3624
- CIL 6.31847
