= The Rainmakers =

The Rainmakers may refer to:

== Music ==
- The Rainmakers (band), from Kansas City, Missouri, US
  - The Rainmakers (album), 1986
- The Rainmakers, an Australian band whose members included Neil Murray and Christine Anu
- The Rainmakers, a Filipino Manila sound group

== Other uses ==
- The Rainmakers (film), a 1935 American comedy
- Seattle Yannigans/Rainmakers, a baseball team

== See also ==
- Rainmaker (disambiguation)
