= Caloian =

Rainmaking and fertility rite in Romania

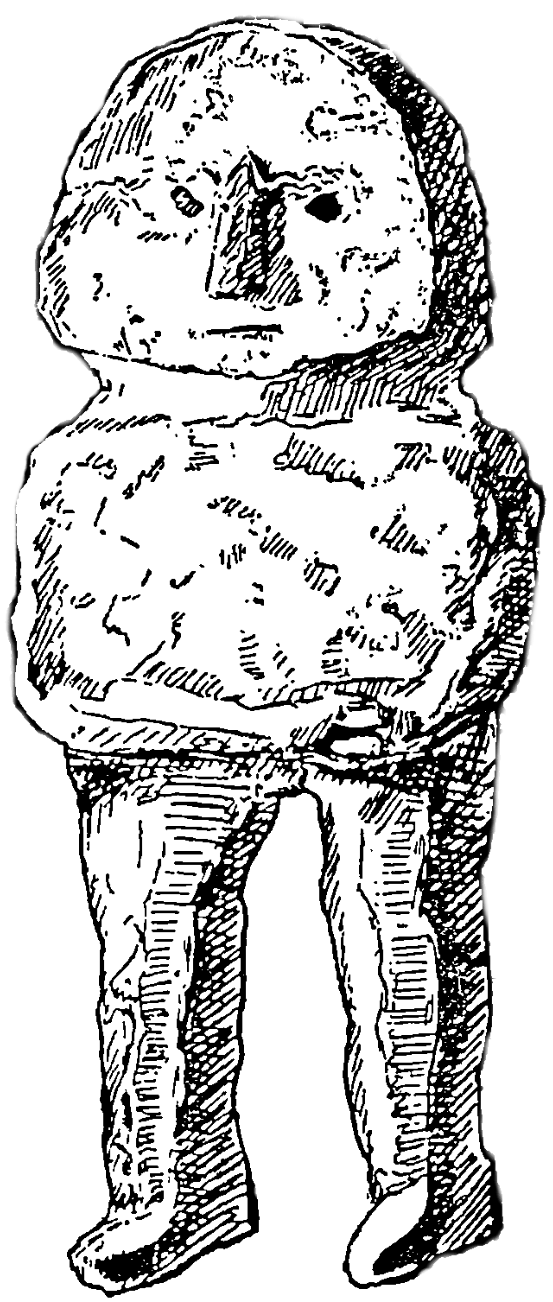
- Caloian figurine from Viziru

Creature information
- Other name(s): Calian(i), Caloiță, Scaloian, Gherman, Iene
- Grouping: Effigy
- Folklore: Romanian (also Csángó, Gagauz)

Origin
- Region: Muntenia, Northern Dobruja, Oltenia, Western Moldavia (principally); Bessarabia, Bukovina, Transylvania (locally)

Caloian (also Calian(i), Caloiță, Scaloian, Gherman, or Iene) was a rainmaking and fertility rite in Romania, similar in some ways to Dodola. Its namesake is a clay effigy, whose sculpting, funeral, exhumation, and eventual destruction are centerpieces of the display. The source of this ritual, as is the case with those of many other local popular beliefs and practices, precedes the introduction of Christianity, although it came in time to be associated with Orthodox Easter or with the Feast of the Ascension. In some variants it was performed on a precisely calculated day two to three weeks after Easter, though local communities could also revive it at other times of the year, specifically during drought. The figurine was generally made from clay and most often by girls, though sometimes also by boys or married women; the ceremony itself would draw in the whole village community as spectators, and, in isolated cases, also had active participation from the Romanian Orthodox clergy. The mimicry of Christian funerals was widespread, but absent from the more established forms of the ritual.

Before dying out in the 1990s, the Caloian tradition had possibly survived for millennia, and may have originated with Dacian strands of Paleo-Balkan mythology. It evoked memories of human sacrifice for the appeasement of rain deities, with parallel near-sacrifices of girls being still attested in rural Romania during the first half of the 20th century. The Caloian litany, which exists in various arrangements as a sample of primitive Romanian literature, usually refers to the figure being sent off to the skies to unlock rain, and buried so that it may be reborn. The figurine's mother is hinted at in such poems, and in some cases played by one of the girls attending the funeral procession.

Caloian events were largely confined to Muntenia, Oltenia and Northern Dobruja (the southern part of Romania), though they have been well attested in specific parts of Western Moldavia. Similar practices, assigning usually female characteristics and names to the clay figurine, are spread throughout other parts of the Romanian-speaking areal. They form a continuum of traditions with both Dodola and Germenchuk, which are staples of Bulgarian folklore. Intermingling with the latter is attested in Caloian's primary spread along the Danube, but also in its supposed etymology, which reveals either a Slavonic term for "dirt" or a folkloric nod to Ioannitsa (Ioniță) Kaloyan. The ritual has also been adopted and adapted by ethno-cultural minorities, including the Gagauz and the Csángós.

== Ritual ==
=== Spring variant ===
Caloian had a spring version, which often occurred on the "third Tuesday after Easter", and concluded on the following Thursday. Folklorists Ion H. Ciubotaru an Silvia Ciubotaru write that having fixed days for Caloian during Easter was "wholly exceptional" in a Moldavian context; they also indicate one other variant in which Caloian coincided with the first Thursday after Easter. As noted by ethnologist Anca Ceaușescu, this variant was specifically a fertility rite, which was mostly tied to spring and renewal, rather than to the celebration of Easter itself. She records instances where Caloian was performed on the sixth week after Easter, on Thomas Sunday, or "always around May 8". Children up to the age of 12 were preferred for performing the ritual, owing to their "ritual purity", and in some cases only selected to fit into an odd number. Performers are most often described as young girls, and sometimes boys, though folklorist Teodor Burada, who speaks from a Western Moldavian perspective, also records the occasional involvement of married women. According to Ciubotaru and Ciubotaru, a situation idealized in the more traditional forms of the Caloian was that in which the people involved were girls around the age of nine, or adolescent virgins, who were either sisters or first cousins. Men remained strictly prohibited for most of Caloian's history.

Depending on the communities involved, the Caloian was regarded as an infant, a grown child, or an adult. His effigy was put together from fresh yellow clay, and sometimes also mud, old rags, or wax. The latter two variants are described by the Ciubotarius as modern improvisations. In most versions, the result would reach 50 cm (20 in) in length, though some stood as tall as "a seven-year-old child." As Burada notes, the Caloian makers made sure to present it in a mortuary pose, with hands crossed on the chest; sometimes, a secondary figure, the "female" Caloiță, would be added. Also according to Burada, the clay would be adorned with basil and the red-colored shells of Easter eggs, then placed inside a small coffin. The Easter egg variant remained well attested in the local culture of Niculițel, though other accounts refer to the Caloian being dressed in flowers and made to hold up a candle; a cross was placed near its head. Moldavian variants make ample and "homeopathic" use of plants which grow on or near bodies of water—reeds, but also burdock, dwarf elder, butterbur, and fleaworts. Folklorist Ion I. Drăgoescu reported a form of the ritual as seen in Potlogi, where the Caloian (known here exclusively as Caloiță) is made from dough, and its coffin carved out of a pumpkin shell.

The group would then proceed to bury the Caloian "outside the village, either out in the shrubland, or in some secluded area of the woods, or alongside a body of water, if such are located within proximity of the village." In some documented cases, the burial spot was specifically chosen as the line separating two villages or at crossroads, which were also "mythical places, spaces allowing for the communication between two worlds". The choice of such locations "enhances the magic in the act of burial". In the oldest variants, Christian symbolism is scarcely present in the funeral ceremony, and the procession is limited to girls wearing leaves of dwarf elder for clothes. During the ceremony as witnessed by Burada, a girl would act and dress as the officiating priest, while another one would hold up the ceremonial flag (prapur), comprising a tall stick and a white handkerchief. The cortege would include mourners, who perform a mock-litany. The Romanian Academy's treatise on Romanian literature (Istoria literaturii romîne, 1964) describes this as sung to "its own tune, a syllabic one, almost recitative in its rhythm." The spring variant, as recorded in Burada, reads:

Iene, Iene,
Caloiene,
Mă-ta te cătà,
Prin pădurea rară,
Cu inima amară,
Prin pădurea deasă
Cu inima arsă,
Și mi te plânge,
Cu lacrimi de sânge,
Iene, Iene,
Caloiene.

Translation:

Iene, Iene,
Caloiene,
Your mom looks for thee,
In those open woods,
Heart field with wounds,
In that thicker grove,
Heart burns like a stove,
And as she weeps for thee,
Bloody tears fall free,
Iene, Iene,
Caloiene.

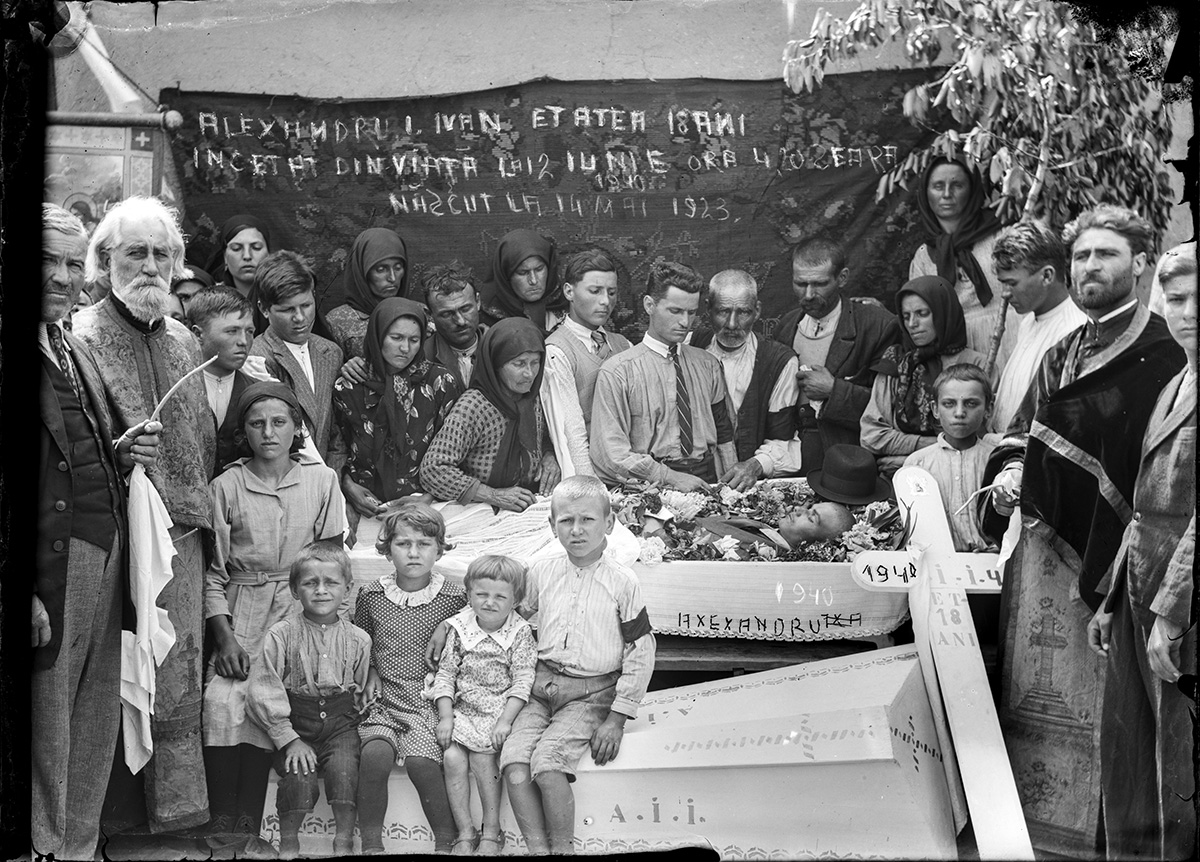
A youth's funeral in southern Romania, showing rituals which some versions of the Caloian strove to mimic. Photograph by Costică Acsinte, June 1940

Some informants and some variants of the rhyme are specific about the burial being done to ensure regeneration. They address the Caloian with reassurances such as "we put you into the ground so that you'll turn green". Other forms include more classical litanies, mourning the Caloian's "little girly body" (trupușor de cuconiță). In such variants, girl mourners rubbed onion slices over their eyes, to produce genuine tears.

In Burada's account, the Caloian was left buried for the following Wednesday, with the group returning on Thursday for the exhumation. The recovered figurine was either broken up into small pieces that were taken back to the village and thrown into wells, or left intact in its coffin and set down on a river to be carried downstream. In one of the fixed-date Moldavian variants, the figurine was always dug out on the Feast of the Ascension. Another variant of the ritual, attested in Fântâna Doamnei, had it buried in a field of green wheat and exhumed at Saint George's Festival (April 23), which, according to folklorist Mihai Pop, underscores Caloian's function as an agrarian fertility rite. The Caloian's departure or destruction was followed by a large and joyous feast, attended by all the villagers and known as pomana Caloianului ("alms of the Caloian"). As noted by Burada, this final part of the ceremony lasted into Friday morning, and specifically involved Lăutari performers; in some parts of the country, working the field on Caloian Tuesday afternoon was virtually a taboo. A folk dance, the Caloian hora, was sometimes performed by those attending the feast.

=== Drought ritual ===
The Caloian was also revived in rainmaking rituals that could take place later in the year, specifically "on days that follow several dry weeks, when it's sultry and the earth gets scorched by drought"; ethnologist Mihaela Bucin argues that, even as a spring ritual, the Caloian was implicitly associated with rainmaking. Progressively, the celebration was reduced in scope to a rain ritual, by confusion with other festivals, and sometimes to stop heavy rainfall as well. Ethnographer Ion Ghinoiu also proposes that the exhumation and destruction portion of some rituals may have originated with people angered by the continuation of drought: "Perhaps at an earlier stage the Caloian was only exhumed on the third day only if no rain had followed its burial [...]. These two rites were then contracted as one, and the latter became a mere sequence of the former." Contrarily, the Ciubotarus propose that breaking up the effigy was done to prevent excessive rain, and also that it represented an attenuated human sacrifice. They refer to first-hand accounts from the early 20th century which described adolescent girls, dressed up in funeral attire, being hurled into Moldavian rivers by other youth, and barely surviving the experience. A transition between the human version and the Caloian is attested in Lișna, where young villagers created human-sized dolls, or zâne, which they pretended were real girls that have to be kidnapped and buried in order to end droughts.

One informant suggested in 1949 that Caloian (known to her as Iene) was only ever performed in times of drought, usually on weekends, and with no day of rest in-between (though "sometimes, preparation are made throughout the week ahead"). In this version, the body was either directly buried near a well or allowed to float downstream on a river, with the coffin as a raft that also held up lit candles. If the latter, any other children encountered along the route were sprayed with water. This feature was reversed in other villages, where the procession itself could expect to be sprayed with water by onlookers. A variant attested in Călmățui had the figurine buried in grains of wheat or barley, whereas in Tudor Vladimirescu the ceremony closely followed regular church burials, including funeral services provided by a Romanian Orthodox priest, and a dedicated grave in the village cemetery. The custom in mixed Csángó–Romanian communities such as Oituz, which was under Catholic influence, is that the figurine be buried near a wayside cross.

With or without the burial, the rainmaking ritual closely mimicked attested practices for Easter-time (including alms which attracted the village in its entirety), with the song performed being a notable exception. It has several "relatively unitary" variants, including one cited by Burada:

Iene, Iene,
Caloiene,
Du-te în cer și cere,
Să deschidă porțile,
Să sloboadă ploile,
Să curgă ca gârlele,
Zilele și nopțile
Ca să crească grânele.

Translation:

Iene, Iene,
Caloiene,
Go up there and see
That they pull the locks,
So that water sprays,
Through the nights and days,
That rain flows and drops,
Pushing up the crops.

Other such variants of the litany begin with a mother's search for her Caloian. Sometimes, one of the girls involved in the procession performs this role in front of the public, with the others pointing to her as they chant. As noted by Pop, they resemble in this the folk ballad Miorița, as well as Christmastime colinde—pointing to a recurring theme in "ancient Romanian poetry". As described by Ceaușescu, these are also the oldest rhymes connected to the burial ritual, and are specific in describing the figurine as a "mediator between the people and the sky above". The drought Caloian as performed around Bucharest used one such specific variant, in the southern Muntenian dialect:

Iene, Iene,
Scaloiene,
S-a dus mă-ta la Ploiești,
Ca să ia cheițele,
Să descuie porțile.
Roagă-te lui Dumnezeu,
Ca să-ți dea cheițele,
Să descui porțile,
Să cură ploițele,
Că s-a uscat grânili,
Grânili, porumbili.

Translation:

Iene, Iene,
Scaloiene,
Your mom's in Rain City,
For the keys to get,
To unlock the gate.
Make prayers to God,
That the keys you'll get,
To unlock that gate,
And that rains fall wet,
On those crops that dry,
On our corn and rye.

The exhortation is sometimes addressed not just to Caloian, but also to the community's dead, most often ones who died recently and at a young age. In some cases, the song is extended by lamentations which depict in detail the sufferings of drought-afflicted villagers. One version from Broscăuți, in a divergent Moldavian subdialect, reads:

Cî tari sîntem uscaț
Șî-nsăŝitaț
Șî n-au vitili ŝi paști
Și n-au vitili di uni be apușoarî
Șî noi tari sîntem arș
Șî uscaț!

Translation:

We sure are parched
And thirsty
And our cattle have nothing to graze on
And our cattle have no water to drink
And we sure are burned down
And parched!

== Cultural significance ==
=== Religious and historical connections ===
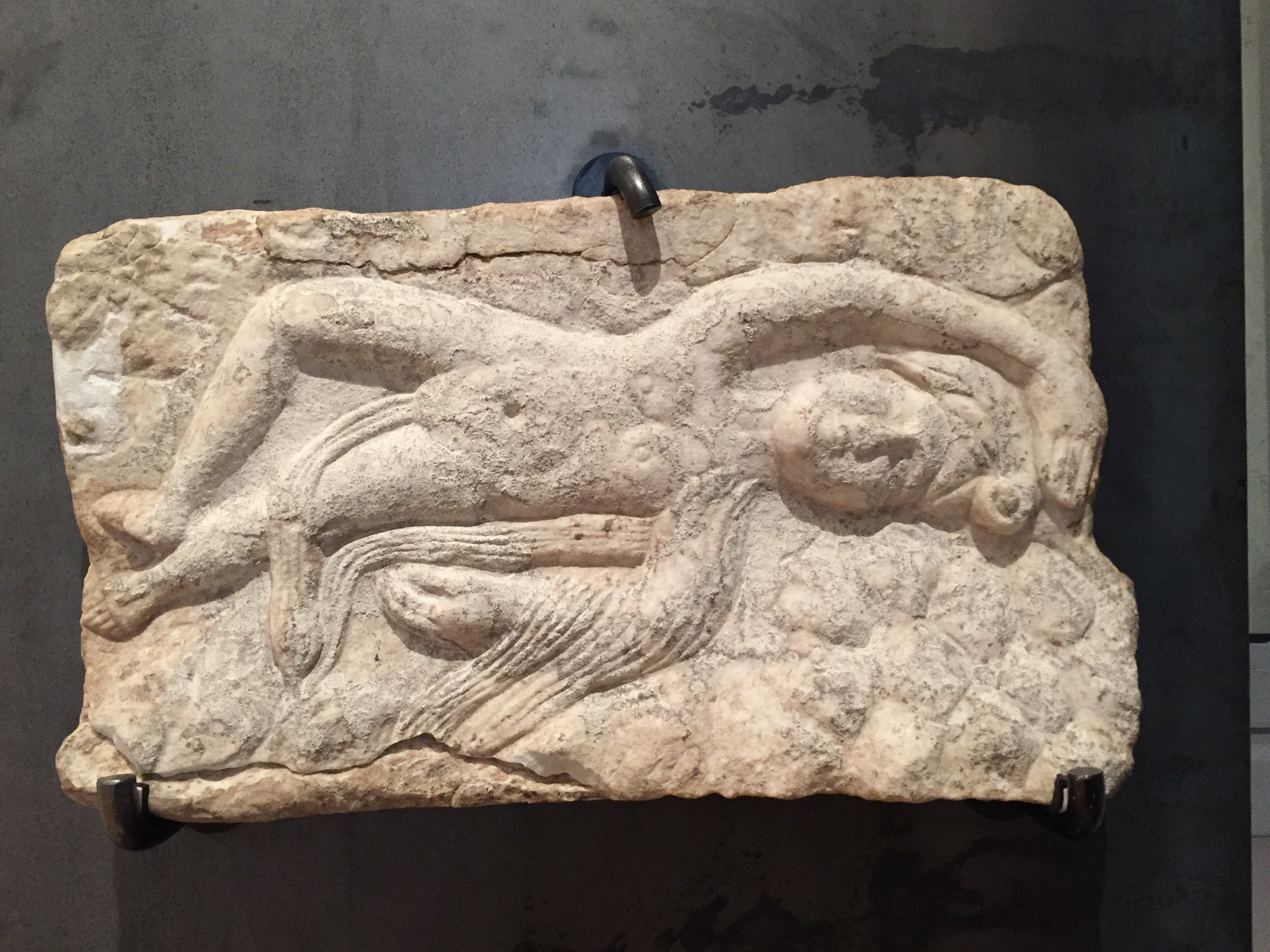
The suicidal self-castration of Attis, before his resurrection. 3rd-century Roman relief in Haute-Garonne, France

The Caloian is one of several burial ceremonies present in Romanian folklore—Pop draws parallels with the chasing out of the Brezaia doll at Christmas and New Years', or with the symbolic burial of a ceremonial leader at Junii Brașoveni feasts. As "one of the most archaic elements covered by the folk Calendar", Caloian itself may be deeply connected to the mythological lore of ancient cultures. Istoria literaturii romîne described Caloian as one of several songs or chants which serve to "mirror forms of [social] life that lead us back to the patriarchal village as it was at the dawn of the feudal era", and more particularly "descriptions of ceremonials or rites." Further: "the Caloian was, at least up to a point, the reification of an old concept regarding the Oriental god of nature, who dies and is resurrected."

As early as 1883, pioneer ethnologist Gheorghe Săulescu discussed similarities between Caloian and Dodola, whom he respectively knew as Calian and Papaluga. In Săulescu's reading, both were originally "national gods" of the Romanians. This approach linked Calioan with interest in Paleo-Balkan mythology. More specifically, Burada proposed that Caloian originated with the pre-Christian Dacians in Northern Dobruja (Scythia Minor). Drăgoescu argues for the same reading, reviewing the practice as "pre-Christian, agrarian", and ultimately a remnant of Dacian material culture. Contrarily, other scholars place the Caloian's roots in Roman Dacia, with imitations of the Argei cult. Beginning with the writings of Marcu Beza, researchers have focused on the death-and-rebirth component of the practice, drawing connections between the Caloian and various religions of the Ancient Near East—with specific focus on Dumuzid and Attis. Ciubotaru and Ciubotaru describe Caloian as "perhaps Thracian", and note parallels with both Attis and Dumuzid—but also with Baldr, Xipe Totec and Yarilo; the ritual in its details, they note, closely resembles one found among the Shapsugs. Writer Victor Eftimiu argues that Caloian's immediate origin is in Slavic paganism, as a localized rendition of the Morena cult; instead, folklorist Mihail Vulpescu highlights parallels with the Adonis cult. Ceaușescu proposes a generic reading of the figurine itself as an "effigy of the rain god".

There is also significant overlap between the Romanian Caloian and Germenchuk, present in Bulgarian folklore, with which southern Romanian traditions are fully contiguous. Though Gherman is attested as an alternative for Caloian in Muntenia, some other Romanian iterations of the ritual have no known correspondent in any culture. The name of (S)caloian, whether or not indicative of its origin, is probably a borrowing from Greek onomastics; comparatist Francis Lebrun noted the existence of a Khaloïánnis (Χαλοΐάννης) song in Greek folklore, proposing that it shares traits with the Romanian ritual. Linguist Petre Coman verified the existence of the word loián, used for "rain" in the dialectal Romanian of Măcin. Another linguist, George Giuglea, noted its partial synonymy with the Albanian llohë ("sleet") and the Romanian noian ("deluge"). Giuglea further argued that a once-significant spread of loián would explain (S)caloian, specifically its "idea of rain, of water".

The name referring to both figurine and ritual has also attracted attention for its hypothetical connections with the Second Bulgarian Empire, which controlled territories on both sides of the Danube. Philologist Vasile Bogrea sees Caloian as originally a likely reference to a 12th-century Bulgarian Tsar, Ioannitsa (Ioniță) Kaloyan, polemically known in Greek as Skyloioannes (which would explain contexts in which Scaloian is used). However, Bogrea cautions that the origin may prove to be the Romanian noun (s)căluș, which would link Caloian with the Călușari fraternity. Geographer Constantin Brătescu uses Caloian rituals in Northern Dobruja as evidence "that a rather wide area" of Northern Dobruja was inhabited by proto-Romanian Vlachs during Ioannitsa's empire. In 2017, ethnologists Delia-Anamaria Răchișan and Călin-Teodor Morariu indicated the origin of the name in the Slavonic kalŭ (калъ), meaning "dirt", though also noting that "some have correlated the practice with the name of Tsar Ioniță" or derived it from John the Baptist. The Slavonic derivation had also been proposed earlier by Pericle Papahagi and Ion Aurel Candrea, who suggest kale an ("yellow clay").

=== Spread and transformation ===
Săulescu was the first to record the Caloian as he witnessed it in Western Moldavia. In 1915, Burada was aware of it existing only in "certain villages" of Muntenia—split between Brăila, Buzău and Ialomița counties—and in only one locality of Western Moldavia—namely Hermeziu, Iași County. To these he added Northern Dobruja's Tulcea County—with the figurine, exclusively known here as Scaloian, being disposed off on the Danube. Caloian and its variants were only known in certain parts of Transylvania, and were never popular there, possibly owing to a very specific interdiction being enforced during the Reformation—known to have been applied against the Călușari, by 1675. Ethnologist Pamfil Bilțiu notes that an unnamed rainmaking ritual was nevertheless always practiced in that region, into the late 20th century. According to Bilțiu, it was still recognized by the old women of Leordina and other villages in Maramureș County, who recalled figurines being made out of either cloth or clay. Meanwhile, the custom had spread out to eastern peripheral areas: one 1920 report notes the Caloian being practiced by the Gagauz and Romanians of Vulcănești, in Bessarabia (now Gagauzia, Republic of Moldova).

According to Pop, the ritual had a "much larger area" than usually acknowledged, though derivatives such as Muma ploii ("Mother of Rain"), in Oltenia, and Cheloșag at Ferești in Western Moldavia. As he notes, Muma ploii also involves a burial ceremony and litanies which "seem to be only variants of the Scaloian songs." Ciubotaru and Ciubotaru refer to the same issue in noting that Caloian and its most archaic forms appear in southernmost Moldavia, whereas heterodox varieties take precedence in rural areas situated more to the north, including some areas of Bukovina. Examples include Ploița and Ploițica ("Rainy Girl") in Focuri, Păpușa ("Doll") in Horodniceni, and Mama secetei ("Mother of Drought") in Heleșteni and Santa Mare. Late adoption correlates with the usage of common female names, as is the case with Aglăița of Concești and Havârna, Catrina of Lungani, and Maricica of Vorona. Caloian-related customs appearing under various guises were also scrutinized and discussed by other folklorists. They note (as with Adrian Fochi) that Caloian should be seen as one specific incarnation of a ritual which mostly employs feminine figurines under many other names, including Caloiana, Ploaia ("The Rain"), and Maica Călătoarea ("Mother Traveler"). Specifically in Oltenia, the female figurine was asked to ensure plentiful rainfall, whereas a male one, Tatăl Soarelui ("Sun's Father"), was buried next to her to ensure that the rains would also stop. These twin burials could also garner approval from the Orthodox clergy—at Leu, the mock-funeral involved passing through the churchyard. West of Transylvania, the Romanians of Hungary had "no recollection of the Caloian". They marked a festival known as Paștele morțîlor [sic] ("Easter of the Dead"), in which they hurled eggshells into rivers, and also had Păpărugă as a localized Dodola; some fashioned Muma ploii on a separate occasion, using only clay that had been used to build a cob oven.

Pop argues that Caloian rituals were carefully maintained in certain communities by the more traditional folk, as "customs whose continued practice was of vital interest to the entire community", and "not at all child's play"; despite this, he reports that Caloian had died out by 1999, when his research was published. Similarly, Răchișan and Morariu note that, like both the Dodola and the Caloian stand as "agrarian customs practiced by children to benefit the community, and should not be mistaken for children's games." According to Ceaușescu, the practice only degenerated into "children's folklore" because of advances in agriculture, which rendered its sacred functions socially irrelevant.

In 1973, Valeriu Anania published his play Greul Pămîntului ("Weight of the Earth", or "Pregnancy with the Earth"), which is a mythopoeia of Caloianul as the "Vlach myth". Anania depicts Tsar Ioannitsa as a Vlach hero whose death is necessary for the survival of his kin, and whose burial under the Vlachs' main citadel consolidates their presence in history. The play also fictionalizes the origins of Io, once used as an introductory title by Romanian rulers, suggesting that it is the "seed" of Ioannitsa's name, and a recollection of his sacrifice. Anania's work was followed in 1975 by Ion Lăncrănjan's novel, Caloianul, which alludes to the clay doll as an existential metaphor—the protagonist, Alexandru Ghețea, is shown to be dying a "great" death, like a "creation of smooth clay." Such imagery was invoked by Ion Gheorghe in his 1976 poetry volume, Noimele ("The Meanings"). The ritual's name was also revived by Romanian wine producers, with Crama Oprișor marketing as Caloian its Fetească neagră, rosé and Merlot varieties.

== See also ==
- Omek Tannou
