= Juan Baigorri Velar =

Argentinian engineer (1891–1972)

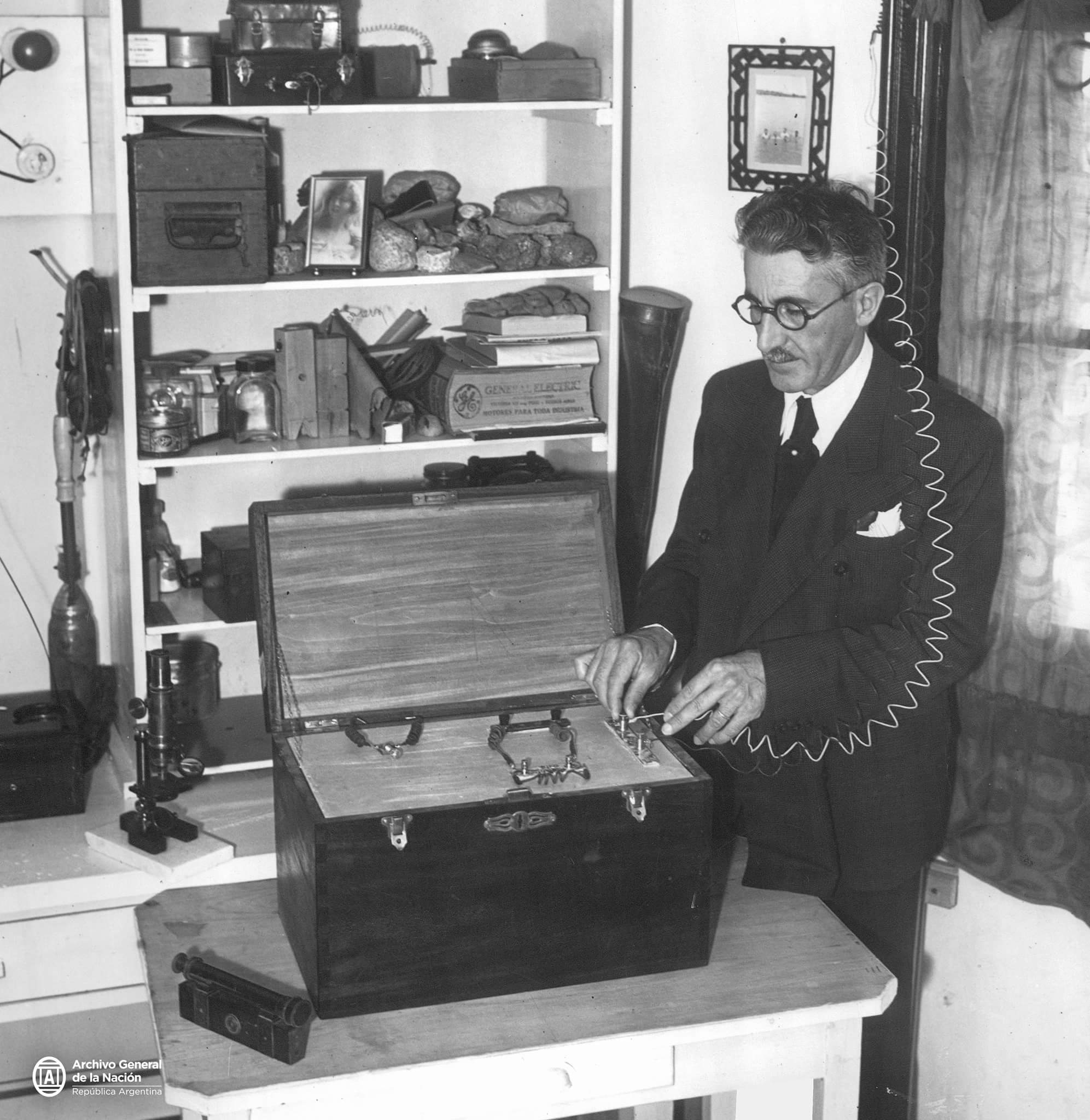
Juan Baigorri Velar and his rain-making machine. (1938)

Juan Pedro Baigorri Velar (1891 in Concepción del Uruguay – 24 March 1972 in Buenos Aires) was an Argentine engineer; known for his claims that he had invented a rain-making machine.

== Career ==
His father was a military officer. Raised in Buenos Aires, he studied at the Colegio Nacional. Later, he travelled to Italy, where he attended the University of Milan and received a degree in engineering, with a specialty in geophysics. He worked for several fuel companies, which involved trips to numerous countries, investigating soil composition and exploring for oil. During the course of these trips he made his own instruments, for detecting minerals and electromagnetism.

In 1929, he was invited by Enrique Mosconi to join the newly created YPF, a state-owned Argentine energy company. He had been working primarily from the United States but, at that time, he returned to Argentina and settled there permanently.

== The Rain-Making Machine ==
According to the newspaper Crítica, its invention came about accidentally, when he was in Bolivia using his mineral detecting device. When it was connected, a light rain suddenly began to fall. He apparently concluded that was due to the "electromagnetic congestion" it produced. After that, he spent much of his time attempting to make it more effective. The final version was about the size of a 14" TV set, with a battery and two antennas...one negative, one positive. It was presented at the offices of the Central Argentine Railway, for publicity purposes.

The company manager proposed that he make it rain in Santiago del Estero Province, which was going through one of the worst droughts in its history. In 1938, he travelled to Pinto with a representative of the company. According to witnesses, when the machine was turned on the wind changed direction, it became cloudy, and twelve hours later there was a brief downpour. He was encouraged to create a higher-power device and, later that year, took it to Santiago del Estero, the provincial capital. After fifty-five hours of being in operation, 2.5 inches of rain fell.

Upon returning to Buenos Aires, he was interviewed by several newspapers and magazines, local and foreign. He also received criticism from Alfredo Galmarini, head of the Meteorology Directorate, who called the machine a "parody" and didn't believe that Baigorri was serious. In response, he promised to make it rain in Buenos Aires in three days, activated the machine, and sent an umbrella to Galmarini. Clouds began to gather on the first night and, the following morning, there was a downpour. After claiming another successful demonstration in Carhué, he returned to his regular career, saying that he was tired of the publicity.

In 1951 Raúl Mendé, the Minister of Technical Affairs, asked him to put his machine back into use. The following year, he claimed to have caused rain in Caucete, where there had supposedly been a drought for eight years. In 1953, he made a similar claim for La Pampa Province. Eventually, interest in him and his device waned, and he went into seclusion. He had never revealed exactly how his device worked, and suggested that only he could put it into operation properly. He was gradually forgotten.

His refusal to patent his machine led to suspicions that it was a fraud. Eduardo Piacentini, of the Servicio Meteorológico Nacional, declared that Baigorri's machine might be able to predict rain, but not cause it. There was also the possibility that his work was affected by confirmation bias, whereby people would remember when it rained, but not when it had failed to. Nevertheless, similar experiments in other parts of the world, such as the United Arab Emirates, indicated that his basic theory might be correct.

He died in poverty and was buried at La Chacarita Cemetery. Few people attended his funeral, as it was raining heavily that day. His house in the Villa Luro district has not been preserved, and the fate of his device is unknown.
