= Rainmaking =

Weather modification ritual

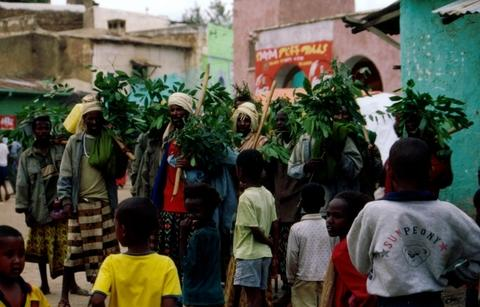
A rain dance being performed in Harar, Eastern Ethiopia

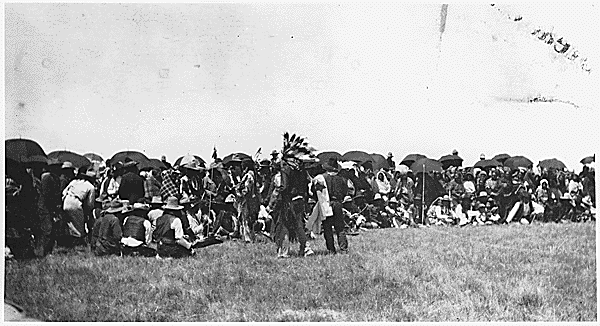
Rain dance, ca. 1920 (from the Potawatomi agency, presumably Prairie Band Potawatomi people)

Rainmaking is a weather modification ritual that aim to invoke rain. It is based on the belief that humans can influence nature, spirits, or their ancestors who withhold or bring rain.

Among the best known examples of weather modification rituals are North American rain dances, historically performed by many Native American tribes, particularly in the Southwestern United States. Some of these weather modification rituals are still implemented today.

== North America ==
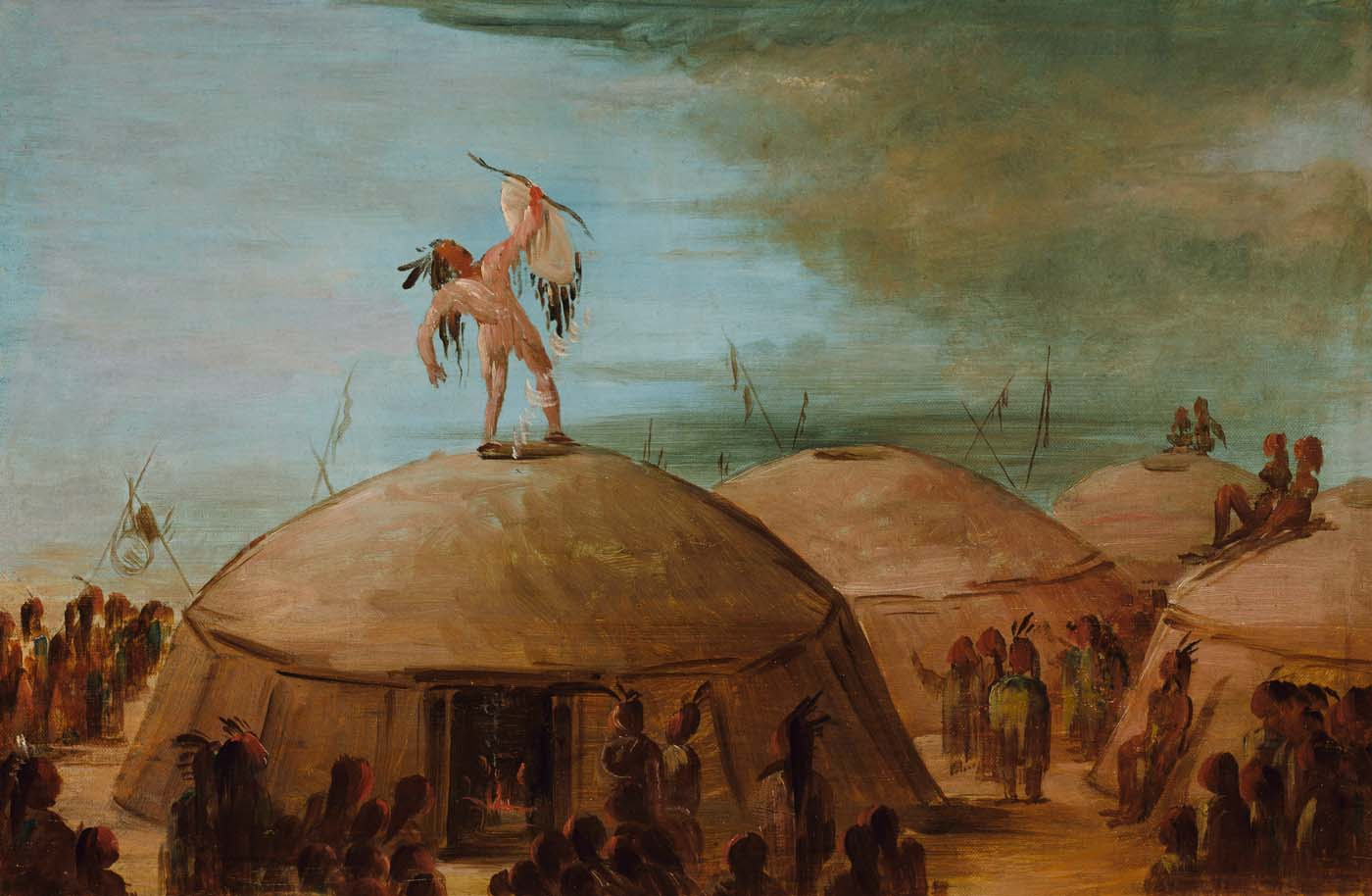
Rainmaking among the Mandan by George Catlin, 1830s

Julia M. Buttree (the wife of Ernest Thompson Seton) describes the rain dance of the Zuni, along with other Native American dances, in her book The Rhythm of the Redman. Feathers and turquoise, or other blue items, are worn during the ceremony to symbolize wind and rain respectively. Guidance on how to properly perform the Rain Dance has been preserved through oral tradition.

In the Ozarks, multiple methods of attempting to call rain have been documented:

Other hillmen try to produce rain by burning brush along the creeks, or hanging dead snakes belly-up on fences, or killing frogs and leaving them in the dry road, or putting salt on gravel bars, or suspending live turtles above the water. [..] In some localities people imagine that they can cause a rain by submerging a cat in sulphur water—they don't drown the animal, but make sure that it is completely under water for a moment at least. I once saw this tried at Noel, Missouri, but without any success.

== Africa ==
Rain is a central concern of low-rainfall African societies outside Equatorial Africa, which depend on it for their sustenance and that of their animals. The power to make rain is usually attributed to African kings. In a number of African societies, kings who failed to produce the expected rain ran the risk of being blamed as scapegoats and killed by their people.

=== Maghreb ===
==== Tunisia ====
Omek Tannou is an ancient Tunisian rainmaking ritual traditionally performed by rural communities during periods of drought. Children parade a wooden doll representing the goddess Tanit, singing supplications for rain. which was inherited from Punic and Berber traditions involving invocations of the goddess Tanit. It is now all but extinct though traces of the ritual survive in some folk songs and oral traditions in northern Tunisia.

=== Southern Africa ===
==== San people ====
Among the San, shamans enter a trance-often induced by rhythmic dancing and hyperventilation-to access the spirit world and spiritually capture mythical "rain animals", notably the eland antelope.

==== Lobedu and Shona peoples ====
A famous rain making monarch is the Rain Queen of Balobedu, South Africa. Queen Modjadji, or the Rain Queen, is the hereditary queen of Balobedu, a people of the Limpopo Province of South Africa. The Rain Queen is believed to have special powers, including the ability to control the clouds and rainfall. She is known as a mystical and historic figure who brought rain to her allies and drought to her enemies. Queen Modjadji is believed to have ancestral ties to the Shona people of present-day Zimbabwe, a culture renowned historically for their rain shrines and ceremonies involving ancestral spirits. The Shona have some of the most powerful rainmaking abilities of the Southern Bantu as it was mainly practiced there until the late 1500s.

==== Mbukushu people ====
The Hambukushu are renowned for their rain-making abilities in the Okavango Delta, earning them the title "The Rain-makers of Okavango."

==== Lozi people ====
The Lozi people of Zambia also conduct rainmaking ceremonies, often led by royal figures and spiritual mediums who invoke Nyambe (their high god) to bless the land with rain.

== Asia ==
=== China ===
Wu Shamans in ancient China performed sacrificial rain dance ceremonies in times of drought. Wu anciently served as intermediaries with nature spirits believed to control rainfall and flooding. "Shamans had to carry out an exhausting dance within a ring of fire until, sweating profusely, the falling drops of perspirations produced the desired rain."

=== India ===
Mandooka Parinaya is a traditional Hindu practice of marrying frogs. The ritual takes place during the dry summer months with the aim of bringing rain.

=== South East Asia ===
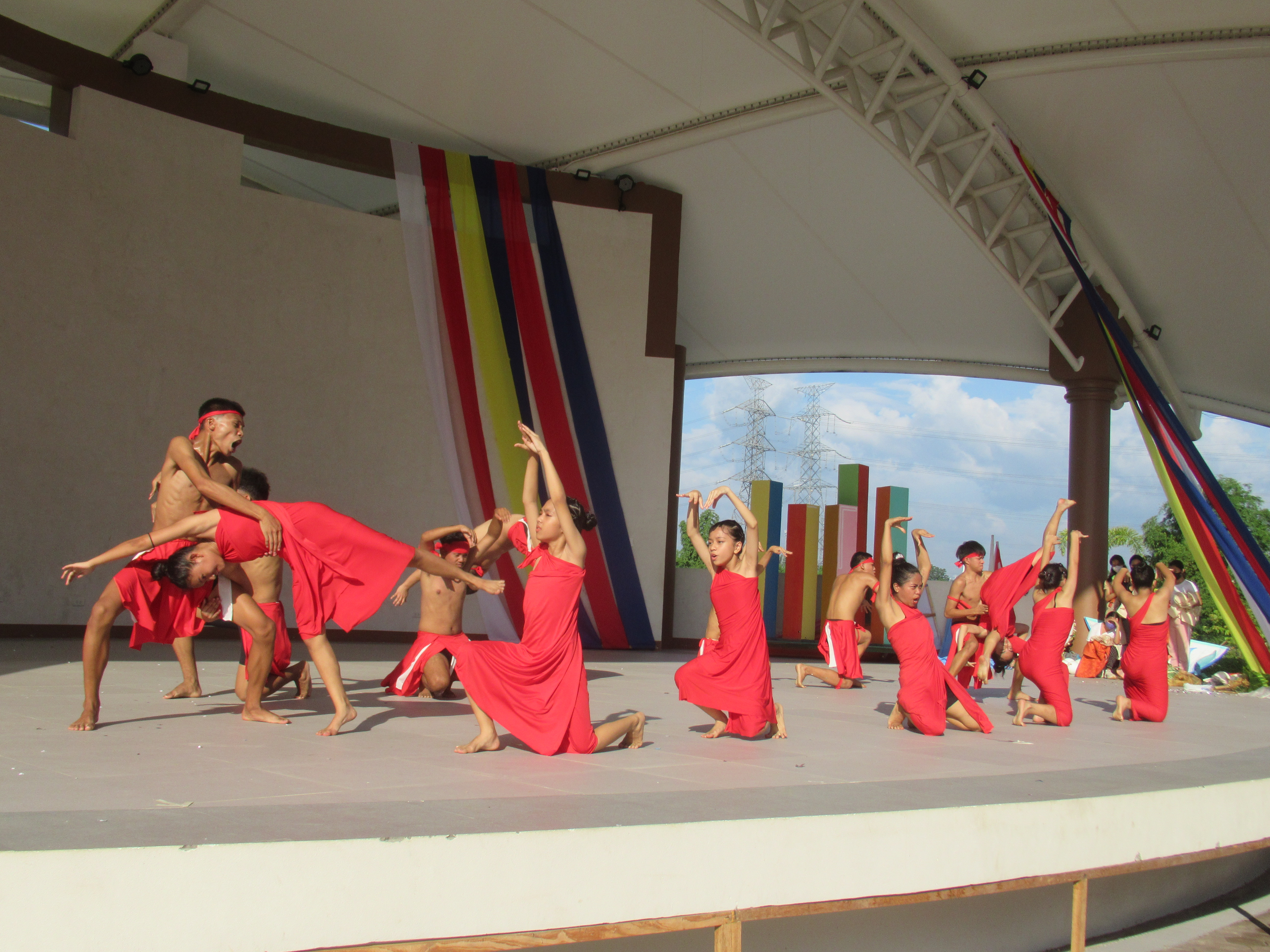
A Dumagat rain dance being performed in San Jose del Monte, Philippines, 2023

In Thailand and Cambodia, various rites exist to obtain rain in times of drought. The most peculiar of these is probably the procession of Lady Cat, during which a cat is carried around in procession through the streets of villages while villagers splash water at the cat, in hope that as water has come on the cat, water will fall on humans as well.

== Europe ==
Roman religion had a ceremony called the aquaelicium (Latin: "calling the waters") which sought to produce rain in times of drought. During the ceremony, the pontifices had the lapis manalis ("Water-flowing stone". Festus distinguishes it from another lapis manalis, "stone of the Manes") brought from its usual resting place, the Temple of Mars in Clivo near the Porta Capena, into the Senate. Offerings were made to Jupiter petitioning for rain, and water was ceremonially poured over the stone.

Caloian, Dodola and Perperuna, among other terms, refer to a family of Slavic and Romanian rainmaking rituals, some of which survived into the 20th century.

== See also ==
- Green Corn Ceremony
