= German (mythology) =

Slavic mythological being

German (Герман, GER-man, pronounced [ˈɡerman]) is a South Slavic mythological being, recorded in the folklore of eastern Serbia and northern Bulgaria. He is a male spirit associated with bringing rain and hail. His influence on these precipitations can be positive, resulting in the amount of rain beneficial for agriculture, or negative, with a drought, downpours, or hail. Rituals connected with German included making a doll intended to represent this personage. This effigy of German, made of rags, fired clay, or dried fruits, was rather large, usually with a distinct representation of the male genitals. It was produced and used in rituals exclusively by girls or young women.

In Eastern Serbia, when a drought developed, girls would make such a doll, and bring it to a river bank. Depending on the regional custom, they would either bury it by the river, or put it in a little coffin and let it float down the river. Two of the girls would then start lamenting for the doll. Asked by the others why they were crying, they would answer, "We are crying for German; because of the drought German has died so that the rain may fall." If the amount of rain falling should then become excessive, the doll would be dug up again. In northern Bulgaria, the rituals with German usually followed immediately after the Dodola rituals, but could be performed independently from them. In some villages they were carried out on the Feast of Saint Germanus. Girls would make the doll, 20 to 50 cm long, and lay it on a slate or in a little coffin. Having adorned it with flowers, they would bury it with funeral observances. After three, nine, or forty days, the doll was dug up and thrown into water.

People would also try to ward off destructive summer hailstorms by placating German with a ritual performed on Christmas Eve. This ritual was recorded in the area around Pirot at the beginning of the 20th century. Immediately before the start of the Christmas Eve dinner, the head of the household would go out to his woodpile, to invite German to dinner. He would take with him a loaf of bread called "good luck", prepared particularly for this ritual, slivovitz, wine, and a wax candle. At the woodpile, he would shout three times, "German, German, wherever you are, come to dinner right now, and in the summer do not let me see your eyes anywhere!" He would then light the candle, take a sip of slivovitz, taste some bread, drink wine, and go back into his house. Asked how he had fared in his encounter with German, he would answer, "He came, so we dined and drank amply of slivovitz and wine, and then we parted."

German, who dies so that nature may regenerate with the falling of rain, can be understood as a spirit of vegetation, dying and then resurrecting with the revival of vegetation. His distinctly represented male genitals symbolize fertility. The doll of German is presumably a metaphorical replacement of the former human sacrifice. It can be included among the Slavic sacrificial dolls, together with the dolls of Yarilo, Kostroma, and Morena.

In Christianized folk beliefs German is identified with Saint Germanus. This saint is associated with protection from hail, and occasionally from lightning, though the latter was generally ascribed to Saint Elijah.

== See also ==
- Caloian
- Dodola and Perperuna
