= Leu, Dolj =

Leu
- Commune
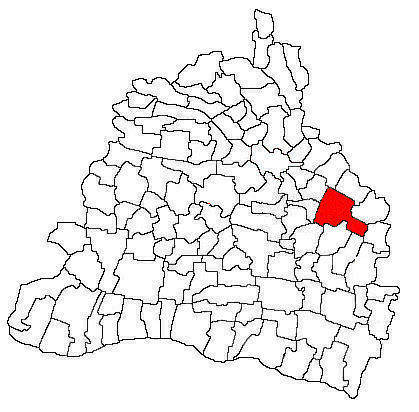
- Location in Dolj County

- Location in Romania
- Coordinates: 44°11′N 24°0′E
- Country: Romania
- County: Dolj

Government
  - Mayor (2024–2028): Auraș Vasile-Botofei (PSD)
- Area: 94.07 km^{2} (36.32 sq mi)
- Elevation: 158 m (518 ft)
- Population (2021-12-01): 4,035
  - Density: 42.89/km^{2} (111.1/sq mi)
- Time zone: EET/EEST (UTC+2/+3)
- Postal code: 207350
- Area code: +(40) 251
- Vehicle reg.: DJ
- Website: www.primarialeu.ro

Leu is a commune in Dolj County, Oltenia, Romania with a population of 4,035 people as of 2021. It is composed of two villages, Leu and Zănoaga.

Historical population
Year	Pop.	±%
2002	5,458	—
2011	4,824	−11.6%
2021	4,035	−16.4%
Source: Census data
