= Dodola and Perperuna =

Rainmaking rituals in Southeast Europe

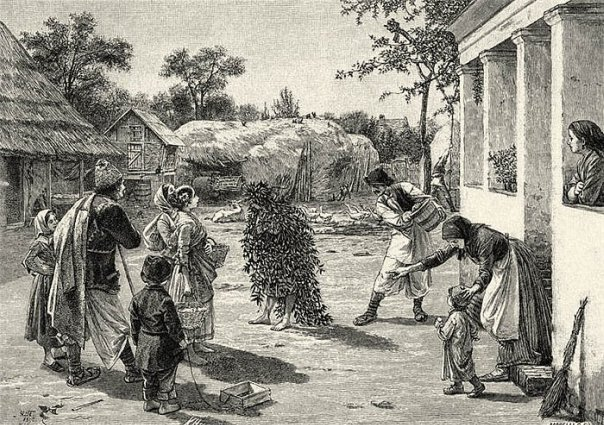
The sprinkling of Dodola with water by Uroš Predić (1892).

Dodola (also spelled Dodole, Dodoli, Dudola, Dudula etc.) and Perperuna (also spelled Peperuda, Preperuda, Preperuša, Prporuša, Papaluga etc.) are rainmaking pagan customs widespread among different peoples in Southeast Europe until the 20th century, found in Albania, Bulgaria, Croatia, Greece, Hungary, Kosovo, Moldova, Montenegro, North Macedonia, Romania, and Serbia. It is still practiced in remote Albanian ethnographic regions, but only in rare events, when the summer is dry and without atmospheric precipitation.

The ceremonial ritual is an analogical-imitative magic rite that consists of singing and dancing done by young girls or boys in processions following a main performer who is dressed with fresh branches, leaves and herbs, with the purpose of invoking rain, usually practiced in times of droughts, especially in the summer season, when drought endangers crops and pastures, even human life itself.

According to one interpretation, the custom could have Slavic origin and be related to Slavic god Perun, and Perperuna could have been a Slavic goddess of rain, and the wife of the supreme deity Perun (god of thunder and weather in the Slavic pantheon). Recent research criticizes invention of a Slavic female goddess, and indicates as possible both Slavic and old-Balkan influences. In Albanian ritual songs are invoked Dielli (the Sun), Perëndi (the Sky, or deity of weather), and Ilia (Elijah, who in Christianized Albanian and South Slavic folklore has replaced the Sun god and the thunder or weather god, Drangue and Perun).

== Names ==
Περπερούνα περπατεί / Perperouna perambulates
Κή τόν θεό περικαλεί / And to God prays
Θέ μου, βρέξε μια βροχή / My God, send a rain
Μιἁ βροχή βασιλική / A right royal rain
Οσ ἀστἀχυα ς τἀ χωράΦια / That as many (as are there) ears of corn in the fields
Τόσα κούτσουρα ς τ ἁμπέλια / So many stems (may spring) on the vines

—
Shatista near Siatista, Western Macedonia, Ottoman Empire, 1903

Rainmaking rites are generally called after the divine figure invoked in the ritual songs, as well as the boy or girl who perform the rite, who are called with different names among different peoples (South Slavs, Albanians, Greeks, Hungarians, Moldovans, Romanians, Vlachs or Aromanians, including regions of Bukovina and Bessarabia). The custom's Slavic prototype name is *Perperuna, with variations:

- Preperuna, Peperuna, Preperuda/Peperuda, Pepereda, Preperuga/Peperuga, Peperunga, Pemperuga in Bulgaria and North Macedonia
- Prporuša, Parparuša, Preporuša/Preporuča, Preperuša, Barburuša/Barbaruša in Croatia
- Peperuda, Papaluga, Papaluda/Paparudă, Babaruta, Mamaruta in Romania and Moldova
- Perperouna, Perperinon, Perperouga, Parparouna in Greece
- Perperona/Perperone, Rona in Albania
- Pirpirunã among Aromanians
- Dodola (including Serbia among previous countries, with local variants Dodole, Dudola, Dudula, Dudule, Dudulica, Doda, Dodočka, Dudulejka, Didjulja, Dordolec/Durdulec etc.).

In Albanian the rainmaking ritual is also called riti i ndjelljes së shiut ("Rain-Invoking Ritual"), riti i thirrjes së shiut ("Rain-Calling Ritual" or "Rite of Calling the Rain") or simply thirrja e shiut ("Call of the Rain"), riti i thatësisë ("Drought Ritual"), as well as riti me dordolecin or riti i dordolecit ("Dordoleci Ritual"), riti i dodolisë ("Dodoli Ritual").

=== Etymology ===
Some scholars consider all the Balkan names of the type per-, perper-, peper-, papar-, etc. to be taboo-alternations to "avoid profaning the holy name" of the pagan Indo-European god *Perkʷūnos. According to Roman Jakobson and others perperuna is formed by reduplication of root "per-" (to strike/beat). Those with root "peper-", "papar-" and "pirpir-" were changed accordingly modern words for pepper-tree and poppy plant, possibly also perper and else.

Dimitar Marinov derived it from Bulgarian word for butterfly where in folk beliefs has supernatural powers related to rain, but according to Jakobson the mythological context of the customs and links explains the Bulgarian entomological names. Michail Arnaudov derived it from Slavic verb "pršiti" (spray). Petar Skok considered prporuša a metaphorical derivation from Slavic prpor/pŕpa (hot ash), pórusa ("when water is poured on burning ash"). Stanisław Urbańczyk and Michal Łuczyński put into question Jakobson's theonymic derivation, deriving instead from Proto-Slavic *perpera, *perperъka (in Polish przepiórka), name for Common quail, which has a role in Polish harvest rituals and the name of the bride in the wedding dance. These are also related to *pъrpati (onomatopoeic), cf. Polish dial. perpotać, perpac, Old East Slavic poropriti.

The name Dodola has been suggested to be a cognate to the Lithuanian Dundulis, a word for "thunder" and another name of the Baltic thunder-god Perkūnas. It is also hypothesised to be distantly related to Greek Dodona and Daedala. Bulgarian variant Didjulja is similar to alleged Polish goddess Dzidzilela, and Polish language also has verb dudnić ("to thunder").

The uncertainty of the etymologies provided by scholars leads to a call for a "detailed and in-depth comparative analysis of formulas, set phrases and patterns of imagery in rainmaking songs from all the Balkan languages".

== Origin ==
The rainmaking practice is a shared tradition among Balkan peoples, and it is not clear who borrowed it from whom. The fact so similar customs in the Balkans are known by two different names the differences are considered not to be from the same time period and ethnic groups. Similar customs outside the Balkans have been observed in the Caucasus, Middle East, and North Africa. William Shedden-Ralston noted that Jacob Grimm thought Perperuna/Dodola were "originally identical with the Bavarian Wasservogel and the Austrian Pfingstkönig" rituals.

Ancient rainmaking practices have been widespread Mediterranean traditions, already documented in the Balkans since Minoan and Mycenaean times. There is a lack of any strong historical evidence for a link between the figures and practices of the ancient times and those that survived to the end of the 20th century, however, according to Richard Berengarten, if seen as "typologically parallel" practices in the ancient world, they may be interpretable at least as forerunners, even if not as direct progenitors of the modern Balkan rainmaking customs.

In the scholarship is usually considered they have a mythological and etymological Slavic origin related to Slavic thunder-god Perun, and became widespread in the Southeastern Europe with the Slavic migration (6th-10th century). According to the Slavic theory, it is a (Balto-)Slavic heritage of Proto-Indo-European origin related to Slavic thunder-god Perun. It has parallels in ritual prayers for bringing rain in times of drought dedicated to rain-thunder deity Parjanya recorded in the Vedas and Baltic thunder-god Perkūnas, cognates alongside Perun of Proto-Indo-European weather-god Perkwunos. The same ritual in an early medieval Ruthenian manuscript is related to East Slavic deity Pereplut. According to Jakobson, Novgorod Chronicle ("dožd prapruden") and Pskov Chronicle ("dožd praprudoju neiskazaemo silen") could have "East Slavic trace of Peperuda calling forth the rain", and West Slavic god Pripegala reminds of Preperuga/Prepeluga variation and connection with Perun. Serbo-Croatian archaic variant Prporuša and verb prporiti se ("to fight") also have parallels in Old Russian ("porъprjutъsja").

According to another interpretation the name Perperuna can be identified as the reduplicated feminine derivative of the name of the male god Perun (per-perun-a), being his female consort, wife and goddess of rain Perperuna Dodola, which parallels the Old Norse couple Fjörgyn–Fjörgynn and the Lithuanian Perkūnas–Perkūnija. Perun's battle against Veles because of Perperuna/Dodola's kidnapping has parallels in Zeus saving of Persephone after Hades carried her underground causing big drought on Earth, also seen in the similarity of the names Perperuna and Persephone. Recent research criticize invention of a Slavic female goddess.

Another explanation for the variations of the name Dodola is relation to the Slavic spring goddess (Dido-)Lada/Lado/Lela, some scholars relate Dodole with pagan custom and songs of Lade (Ladarice) in Hrvatsko Zagorje (so-called "Ladarice Dodolske"), and in Žumberak-Križevci for the Preperuša custom was also used term Ladekarice.

Other scholars like Vitomir Belaj, due to the geographical distribution, consider that the rainmaking ritual could also have Paleo-Balkan origin, or formed separate of worship of Perun but could be etymologically related. One theory, in particular, argues that Slavic deity Perun and Perperuna/Dodola customs are of Thracian origin, however, the name of the Slavic thunder-god Perun is commonly accepted to be formed from the Proto-Slavic root *per "to strike" attached to the common agent suffix -unŭ, explained as "the Striker". The Romanian-Aromanian and Greek ethnic origin was previously rejected by Alan Wace, Maurice Scott Thompson, George Frederick Abbott among others.

== Ritual ==
Perperuna and Dodola are considered very similar pagan customs with common origin, with main difference being in the most common gender of the central character (possibly related to social hierarchy of the specific ethnic or regional group), lyric verses, sometimes religious content, and presence or absence of a chorus. They essentially belong to rituals related to fertility, but over time differentiated to a specific form connected with water and vegetation. They represent a group of rituals with a human collective going on a procession around houses and fields of a village, but with a central live character which differentiates them from other similar collective rituals in the same region and period (Krstonoše, Poklade, Kolade, German, Ladarice, those during Jurjevo and Ivandan and so on). In the valley of Skopje in North Macedonia the Dodola were held on Thursday which was Perun's day. In Hungary the ritual was usually held on St. George's Day. The core of the song always mentions a type of rain and list of regional crops. The first written mentions and descriptions of the pagan custom are from the 18th century by Dimitrie Cantemir in Descriptio Moldaviae (1714/1771, Papaluga), then in a Greek law book from Bucharest (1765, it invoked 62nd Cannon to stop the custom of Paparuda), and by the Bulgarian hieromonk Spiridon Gabrovski who also noted to be related to Perun (1792, Peperud).

South Slavs and non-Slavic peoples alike used to organise the Perperuna/Dodola ritual in times of spring and especially summer droughts, where they worshipped the god/goddess and prayed to him/her for rain (and fertility, later also asked for other field and house blessings). The central character of the ceremony of Perperuna was usually a young boy, while of Dodola usually a young girl, both aged between 10 and 15 years. Purity was important, and sometimes they were orphans. Initially, they were naked, but by the 19th and 20th centuries, the wore a skirt and dress made of fresh green knitted vines, leaves and flowers of Sambucus nigra, Sambucus ebulus, Clematis flammula, Clematis vitalba, fern, small branches of Tilia, Oak and other deciduous shrubs and vines. The greenery initially covered all the body, so that the central figure was almost unrecognizable, but like the necessity of direct skin contact with greenery, it also decreased and became very simple in the modern period. They whirled and were followed by a small procession of children who walked and danced with them around the same village and fields, sometimes carrying oak or beech branches. They sang the ritual prayer and stopped at every house yard together, where the hosts would sprinkle water on chosen boy/girl, who would shake and thus sprinkle everyone and everything around it (example of "analogical magic"). The hosts also gifted treats (bread, eggs, cheese, sausages etc., in a later period also money) to the children, who shared and consumed them. Sometimes, even hosts would drink wine, seemingly as a sacrifice in Perun's honor. The chosen boy/girl was called by one of the name variants of the ritual itself, however in Istria was also known as Prporuš and in Dalmatia-Boka Kotorska as Prpac/Prpats and both regions his companions as Prporuše, while at Pirot and Nišava District in Southern Serbia near Bulgarian border were called as dodolće and preperuđe, and as in Macedonia both names appear in the same song.

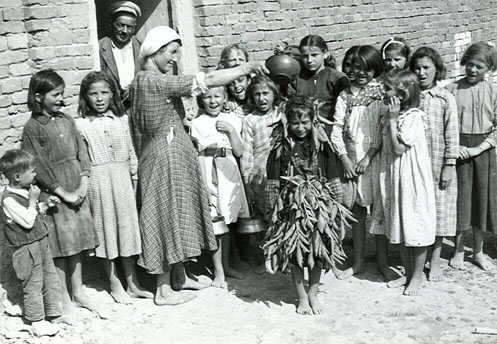
Peperuda performed by Romani in Dobruja, Bulgaria, 1950s.

Recreation of Perperuna custom at Etar Architectural-Ethnographic Complex in Bulgaria, 2012 (video).

By the 20th century once common rituals almost vanished in the Balkans, although rare examples of practice can be traced until 1950-1980s and remained in folk memory. In some local places, like in Albania, can be observed as rare events even in the 21st century.

The main reason is the development of agriculture and consequently lack of practical need for existence of mystical connection and customs with nature and weather. Christian church also tried to diminish pagan beliefs and customs, resulting in "dual belief" (dvoeverie) in rural populations, a conscious preservation of pre-Christian beliefs and practices alongside Christianity. Into customs and songs were mixed elements from other rituals including Christianity, but they also influenced the creation of Christian songs and prayers invoking the rain which were used as a close Christian alternative (decline was reportedly faster among Catholics). According to Velimir Deželić Jr. in 1937, it was an old custom that "Christians approved it, took it over and further refined it. In the old days, Prporuša were very much like a pious ritual, only later the leaders - Prpac - began to boast too much, and Prporuše seemed to be more interested in gifts than beautiful singing and prayer". Depending on region, instead of village boys and girls the pagan ritual by then was mostly done by migrating Romani people from other villages and for whom it became a professional performance motivated by gifts, sometimes followed by financially poor members from other ethnic groups. Due to Anti-Romani sentiment, the association with Romani also caused repulsion, shame and ignorance among last generations of members of ethnic groups who originally performed it. Eventually it led to a dichotomy of identification with own traditional heritage, Christianity and stereotypes about Romani witchcraft.

In the present days, older generations of Albanians demonstrate the common practice of rainmaking rituals in their life, but newer generations generally see them as something applied in the past, a tradition that their parents have gone through. Nevertheless, elders still accompany processions of boys and girls, who perform the rainmaking rite dressed with their best traditional clothing except for the main boy or girl, who is dressed entirely in fresh branches, leaves and herbs. Public exhibitions of the ritual are usually performed during Albanian festivals, often for the local audience, but also in the Gjirokastër National Folk Festival, one of the most important events of Albanian culture.

=== Perperuna songs ===
Ioan Slavici reported in 1881 that the custom of Paparuga was already "very disbanded" in Romania. Stjepan Žiža in 1889/95 reported that the once common ritual almost vanished in Southwestern and Central-Eastern Istria, Croatia. Ivan Milčetić recorded in 1896 that the custom of Prporuša also almost vanished from the North Adriatic island of Krk, although almost recently it was well known in all Western parts of Croatia, while in other parts as Dodola. Croatian linguist Josip Ribarić recorded in 1916 that it was still alive in Southwestern Istria and Ćićarija (and related it to the 16th century migration from Dalmatia of speakers of Southwestern Istrian dialect). On island of Krk was also known as Barburuša/Barbaruša/Bambaruša (occurrence there is possibly related to the 15th century migration which included besides Croats also Vlach-Istro-Romanian shepherds). It was also widespread in Dalmatia (especially Zadar hinterland, coast and islands), Žumberak (also known as Pepeluše, Prepelice) and Western Slavonia (Križevci). It was held in Istria at least until the 1950s, in Žumberak until the 1960s, while according to one account in Jezera on island Murter the last were in the late 20th century. In Serbia, Perperuna was only found in Kosovo, Southern and Eastern Serbia near Bulgarian border. According to Natko Nodilo the discrepancy in distribution between these two countries makes an idea that originally Perperuna was Croatian while Dodola was Serbian custom. Seemingly it was not present in Slovenia, Northern Croatia, almost all of Bosnia and Herzegovina and Montenegro (only sporadically in Boka Kotorska). Luka Jovović from Virpazar, Montenegro reported in 1896 that in Montenegro existed some koleda custom for summer droughts, but was rare and since 1870s not practiced anymore.

According to Albanian folk beliefs, the Sun (Dielli) makes the sky cloudy or clears it up. Albanians used to invoke the Sun with rainmaking and soil fertility rituals. In rainmaking rituals from the Albanian Ionian Sea Coast, Albanians used to pray to the Sun, in particular facing Mount Shëndelli (Mount "Holy Sun"), by invoking the names Dielli, Shën Dëlliu, Ilia or Perëndia. Children used to dress a boy with fresh branches, calling him dordolec. A typical invocation song repeated three times during the ritual was: Afterwards, people used to say: Do kemi shi se u nxi Shëndëlliu ("We will have rain because Shëndëlliu went dark"). The Sun used to be also invoked when reappearing after the rain, prayed for increased production in agriculture.

Bulgaria

Letela e peperuda
Daĭ, Bozhe, dŭzhd
Daĭ, Bozhe, dŭzhd
Ot orache na kopache
Da se rodi zhito, proso
Zhito, proso i pshenitsa
Da se ranyat siracheta
Siracheta, siromasi

Albania

Rona-rona, Peperona
Bjerë shi ndë arat tona!
Të bëhetë thekëri
I gjatë gjer në çati
Gruri gjer në perëndi
Ashtu edhe misëri!

O Ilia, Ilia,
Peperuga rrugëzaj
Bjerë shi o Perëndi,
Se qajnë ca varfëri,
Me lot e logori
Thekëri gjer mbë çati,
Gruri gjer në Perëndi.

Croatia-Krk
(Dubašnica, 1896)

Prporuša hodila
Službu boga molila
Dajte sira, dajte jaj
Da nam bog da mladi daž
Od šenice višnji klas!
A ti, bože vični
Smiluj se na nas!

Croatia-Istria
(Vodice, 1916)

Prporuše hodile
Slavu Boga molile
I šenice bilice
Svake dobre sričice
Bog nan ga daj
Jedan tihi daž!

Croatia-Istria
(Čepić, 1896/Štifanići near Baderna, 1906/08)

Preporuči hodili / Prporuše hodile
Iz Prepora grada / 's Prpora grada
Kuda hodili / Da nam bog da dažda
Tuda Boga molili / Crljenoga mažda
Da nam Bog da dažda / I šenice bilice
I crljenoga masta / Svake dobre sričice
I šenice bilice / Šenica nan rodila
I svake dobre srećice / Dičica prohodila
Šenica narodila / Šenicu pojili
Dica nam prohodila / Dicu poženili
I šenicu pojili / Skupi, bože, oblake!
I dicu poženili / Struni bojžu rosicu
Skupi, Bože, oblake / Na tu svetu zemljicu!
Hiti božju kapljicu / Amen, amen, amen
Na ovu svetu zemljicu!
Amen

Croatia-Dalmatia
(Ražanac, 1905)

Prporuše hodile
Putom Boga molile
Da ni pane kišica
Da ni rodi šenica bilica
I vinova lozica

Croatia-Dalmatia
(Ravni Kotari, 1867)

Prporuše hodile
Terem Boga molile
Da nam dade kišicu
Da nam rodi godina
I šenica bjelica
I vinova lozica
I nevjesta đetića
Do prvoga božića
Daruj nama, striko naša
Oku brašna, striko naša
Bublu masla, striko naša
Runce vune, striko naša
Jedan sirčić, striko naša
Šaku soli, striko naša
Dva, tri jajca, striko naša
Ostaj s Bogom, striko naša
Koja si nas darovala

Croatia-Žumberak
(Pavlanci, 1890)

Preperuša odila
Za nas Boga molila
Daj nam Bože kišice
Na ovu našu ljetinu
Da pokvasi mladinu
Pucaj, pucaj ledeno
Škrapaj, škrapaj godino
Mi smo tebi veseli
Kano Isus Mariji
Kaj Marija Isusu
Kano mati djetetu

=== Dodola songs ===
The oldest record for Dodole rituals in Macedonia is the song "Oj Ljule" from Struga region, recorded in 1861. The Dodola rituals in Macedonia were actively held until the 1960s. In Bulgaria the chorus was also "Oj Ljule". The oldest record in Serbia was by Vuk Karadžić (1841), where was widespread all over the country and held at least until 1950/70s. In Croatia was found in Eastern Slavonia, Southern Baranja and Southeastern Srijem. August Šenoa in his writing about the travel to Okić Castle near Samobor, Croatia mentioned that saw two dodole. To them is related the custom of Lade/Ladarice from other parts of Croatia, having chorus "Oj Lado, oj!" and similar verses "Molimo se višnjem Bogu/Da popuhne tihi vjetar, Da udari rodna kiša/Da porosi naša polja, I travicu mekušicu/Da nam stada Lado, Ugoje se naša stada".

Macedonia
(Struga, 1861)

Otletala preperuga, oj ljule, oj!
Ot oracha na oracha, oj ljule, oj!
Ot kopacha na kopacha, oj ljule, oj!
Ot rezhacha na rezhacha; oj ljule, oj!
Da zarosit sitna rosa, oj ljule, oj!
Sitna rosa beriketna, oj ljule, oj!
I po pole i po more; oj ljule, oj!
Da se rodit s' beriket, oj ljule, oj!
S' beriket vino-zhito; oj ljule, oj!
Cheincite do gredite, oj ljule, oj!
Jachmenite do streite, oj ljule, oj!
Lenoite do pojasi, oj ljule, oj!
Uroite do kolena; oj ljule, oj!
Da se ranet siromasi, oj ljule, oj!
Drvete ne so osito, oj ljule, oj!
Da je sita godina; oj ljule, oj!
Drvete ne so oshnica, oj ljule, oj!
Da ja polna koshnica; oj ljule, oj!
Drvete ne so jamache, oj ljule, oj!
Da je tuchna godina, oj ljule, oj!

Serbia
(1841)

Mi idemo preko sela,
Oj dodo, oj dodo le!
A oblaci preko neba,
Oj dodo, oj dodo le!
A mi brže, oblak brže,
Oj dodo, oj dodo le!
Oblaci nas pretekoše,
Oj dodo, oj dodo le!
Žito, vino porosiše,
Oj dodo, oj dodo le!

Serbia
(1867)

Molimo se višnjem Bogu,
Oj dodo, oj dodo le!
Da udari rosna kiša,
Oj dodo, oj dodo le!
Da porosi naša polja,
Oj dodo, oj dodo le!
I šenicu ozimicu,
Oj dodo, oj dodo le!
I dva pera kukuruza,
Oj dodo, oj dodo le!

Serbia
(1867)

Naša doda Boga moli,
Oj dodo, oj dodo le!
Da udari rosna kiša,
Oj dodo, oj dodo le!
Da pokisnu svi orači,
Oj dodo, oj dodo le!
Svi orači i kopači,
Oj dodo, oj dodo le!
I po kući poslovači,
Oj dodo, oj dodo le!

Croatia-Slavonia
(Đakovo)

Naša doda moli Boga
Oj dodole, moj božole!
Da porosi rosna kiša
Oj dodole, moj božole!
Da pokvasi naša polja
Oj dodole, moj božole!
Da urode, da prerode
Oj dodole, moj božole!

Croatia-Slavonia
(Đakovo, 1957)

Naša dojda moli boga da kiša pada
Da pokisne suvo polje, oj, dojdole!
Da pokisnu svi orači
Svi orači i kopači, oj, dojdole!
I po kući poslovači
Oj, dojdole, oj, dojdole!
I dva pera kukuruza
I lanovi za darove, oj, dojdole!
Da urodi, da prerodi, da ne polegne
Oj, dojdole, oj, dojdole!

Croatia-Srijem
(Tovarnik, 1979)

Naša doda moli Boga
Da nam Bog da rosne kiše
Rosne kiše malo više
Na orače i kopače
I na naše suve bašće
Oj dodo, oj dodole!
Da trava raste
Da paun pase
Da sunce sija
Da žito zrija
Oj dodo, oj dodole!

== See also ==
- Caloian
- Slavic paganism
- Albanian paganism
- Folklore of Romania
