= Temple of Mars in Clivo =

Temple of Mars in Rome

The Temple of Mars in Clivo (Latin: Aedes Martis in Clivo) was a temple on the western side of the Via Appia in Rome, between the first and second milestones, built in the early 4th century BCE, and dedicated to Mars. It was the oldest standing temple dedicated to Mars within the city's territory.

== Location and history ==
Situated around two kilometres from the Porta Capena, the Temple of Mars used to sit just outside the Porta Appia, beyond the Aurelian Walls. It was positioned overlooking the valley where the brook Almo ran, and it stood next to a grove. Its name stemmed from a rise in the road leading to it (in Latin a clivus).

According to Livy, the temple was vowed to the god Mars in the aftermath of the Roman defeat at the Battle of the Allia in 390 BCE by the Senones. It was dedicated on 1 June 387 by Titus Quinctius, one of the Duumviri sacrorum. In 189 BCE the Via Appia was paved from the Porta Capena to this point, along with the stretch of road that linked the Via Appia to the temple (the Clivus Martis). This road was then referred to as the Via Tecta, named after the construction of a portico along the road.

Within the temple were a statue of Mars and figures of wolves, which were considered sacred to the god. The statue of Mars was most probably the one erected by the former consul Marcus Claudius Marcellus in 211 BCE, fulfilling a vow made during the conquest of Syracuse in 212 BCE. The writer Julius Obsequens noted in his book the "Prodigiorum liber" (Book of Prodigies) that observers in the past had seen the statue sweating.

Also within the temple was kept one of the two Lapis manalis stones. This stone was used as part of a ceremony of Etruscan origin called the aquaelicium which sought to produce rain in times of drought. The stone was removed from the temple by the pontifices, and taken by procession to the Capitoline Hill, and a sacrifice was made to the god Jupiter, petitioning him to send rain.

The district around the temple, reaching as far as the Almo, was known as ad Martis. It was in this area around the temple that the soldiers of the Republic would assemble before heading off to fight their wars, and it was here that they would return to lay down their arms prior to re-entering the city. It was also the spot where, on 15 July, the Transvectio equitum procession would commence, to commemorate the victory at the Battle of Lake Regillus.

Today, this temple no longer exists, and there are no details as to when it was demolished. It was mentioned in the Einsiedeln Itinerary as still standing in the 8th century. No images exist of the temple except for a frieze on the Arch of Constantine.

== Sources ==
- Platner, Samuel Ball, A Topographical Dictionary of Ancient Rome, Oxford University Press (1929) (online version)
- Rome and Art, TEMPLUM MARTIS IN CLIVO (2016) (online version)
