= Dragonslayer =

Fictional profession

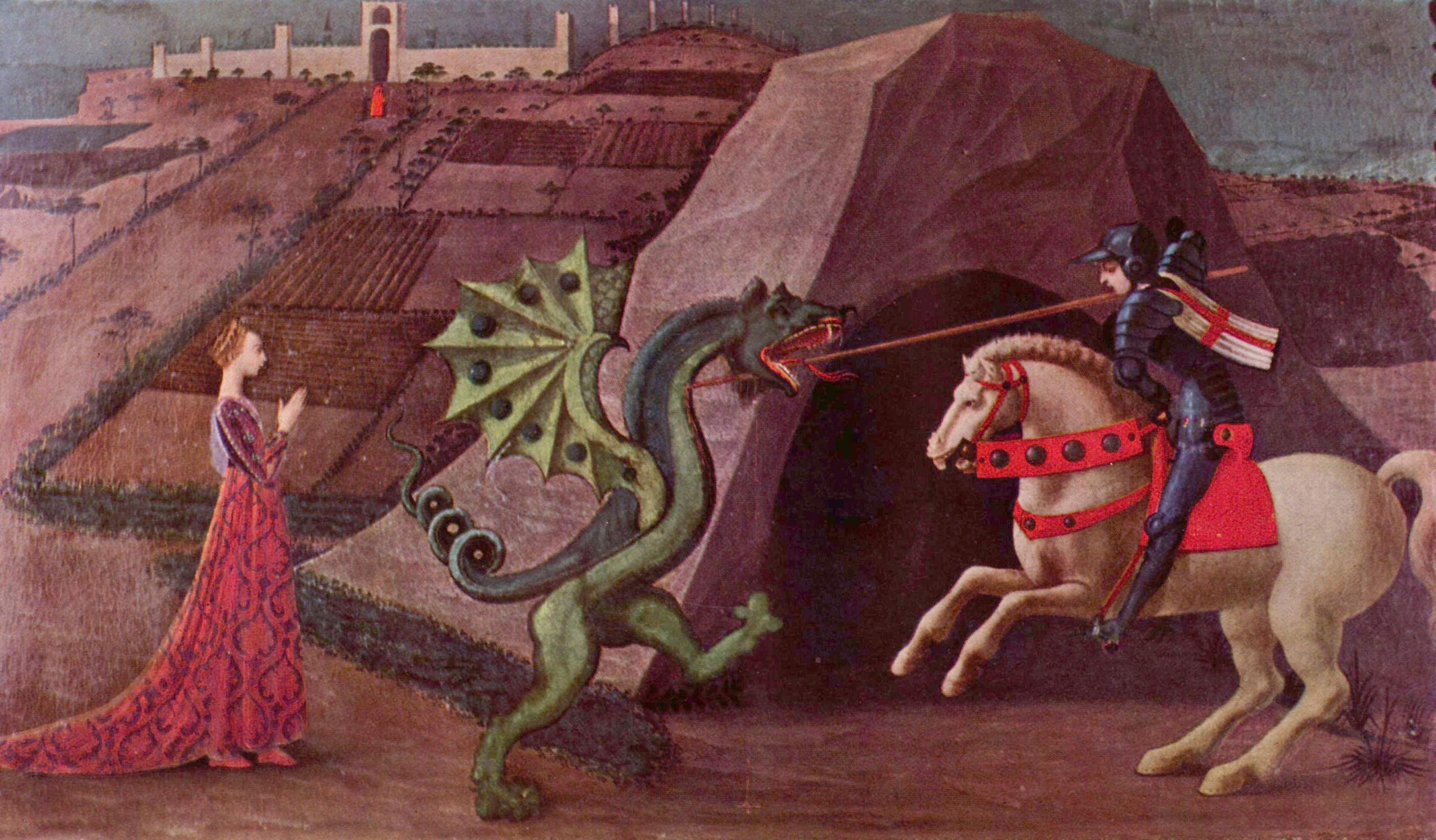
Saint George slaying the dragon, as depicted by Paolo Uccello, c. 1470

A dragonslayer is a person or being that slays dragons. Dragonslayers and the creatures they hunt have been popular in traditional stories from around the world: they are a type of story classified as type 300 in the Aarne–Thompson classification system. They continue to be popular in modern books, films, video games and other forms of entertainment. Dragonslayer-themed stories are also sometimes seen as having a chaoskampf theme—in which a heroic figure struggles against a monster that epitomises chaos.

== Description ==
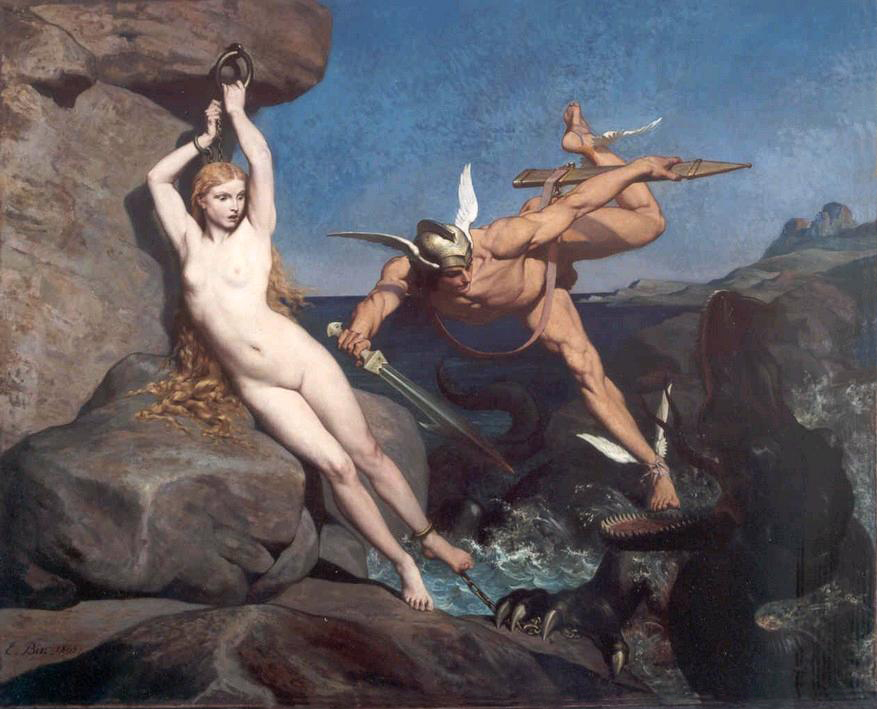
Perseus Delivering Andromeda by Émile Bin (1865)

A dragonslayer is often the hero in a "Princess and dragon" tale. In this type of story, the dragonslayer kills the dragon in order to rescue a high-class female character, often a princess, from being devoured by it. This female character often then becomes the love interest of the account. One notable example of this kind of legend is the story of Ragnar Loðbrók, who slays a giant serpent, thereby rescuing the maiden, Þóra borgarhjörtr, whom he later marries.

There are, however, several notable exceptions to this common motif. In the legend of Saint George and the Dragon, for example, Saint George overcomes the dragon as part of a plot which ends with the conversion of the dragon's grateful victims to Christianity, rather than Saint George being married to the rescued princess character.

In a Norse legend from the Völsunga saga, the dragonslayer, Sigurd, kills Fáfnir—a dwarf who has been turned into a dragon as a result of guarding the cursed ring that had once belonged to the dwarf, Andvari. After slaying the dragon, Sigurd drinks some of the dragon's blood and thereby gains the ability to understand the speech of birds. He also bathes in the dragon's blood, causing his skin to become invulnerable. Sigurd overhears two nearby birds discussing the heinous treachery being planned by his companion, Regin. In response to the plot, Sigurd kills Regin, thereby averting the treachery.

Mythologists such as Joseph Campbell have argued that dragonslayer myths can be seen as a psychological metaphor:

But as Siegfried [Sigurd] learned, he must then taste the dragon blood, in order to take to himself something of that dragon power. When Siegfried has killed the dragon and tasted the blood, he hears the song of nature. he has transcended his humanity and re-associated himself with the powers of nature, which are powers of our life, and from which our minds remove us. ...Psychologically, the dragon is one's own binding of oneself to one's own ego.

== Dragonslayer characters ==
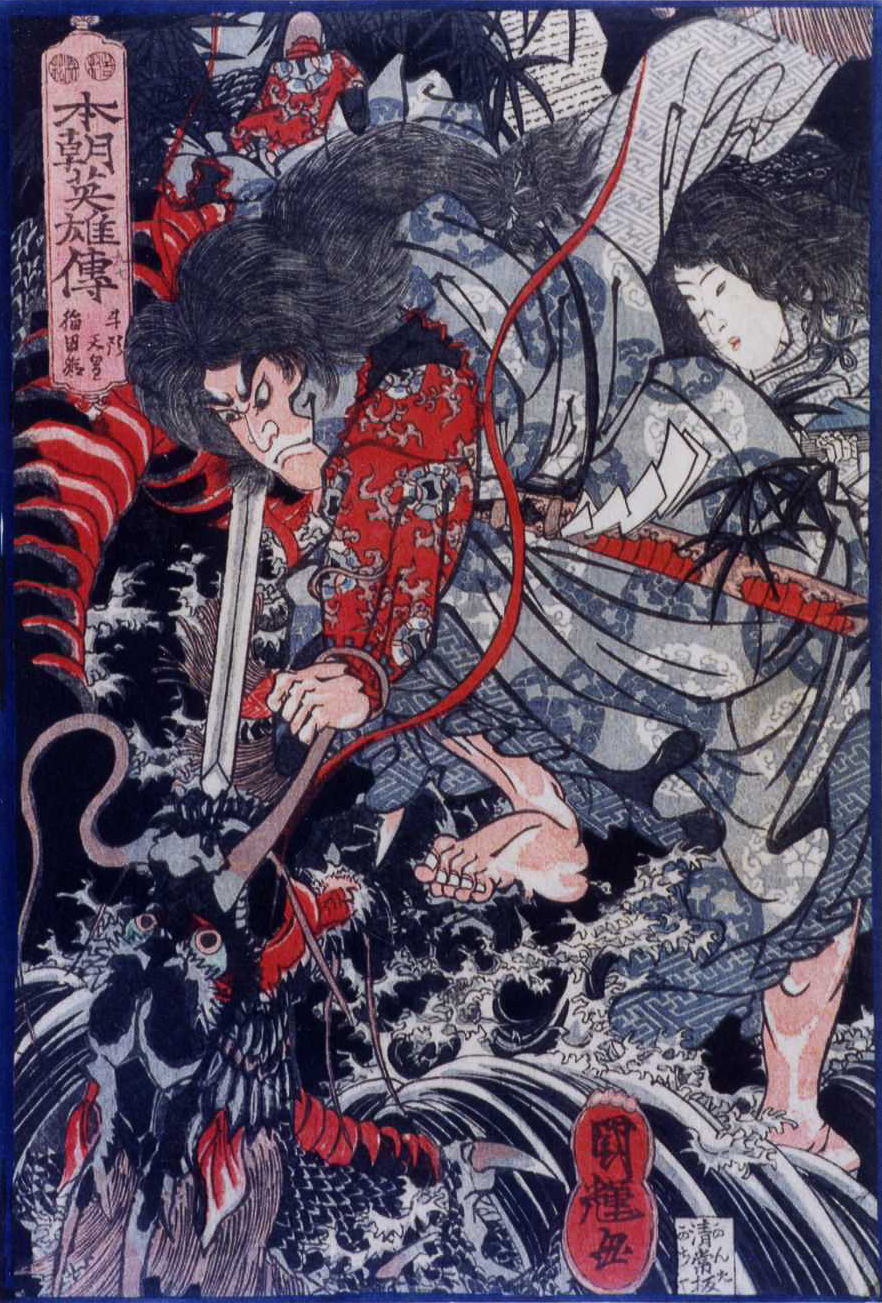
Susanoo slaying the Yamata no Orochi, by Kuniteru

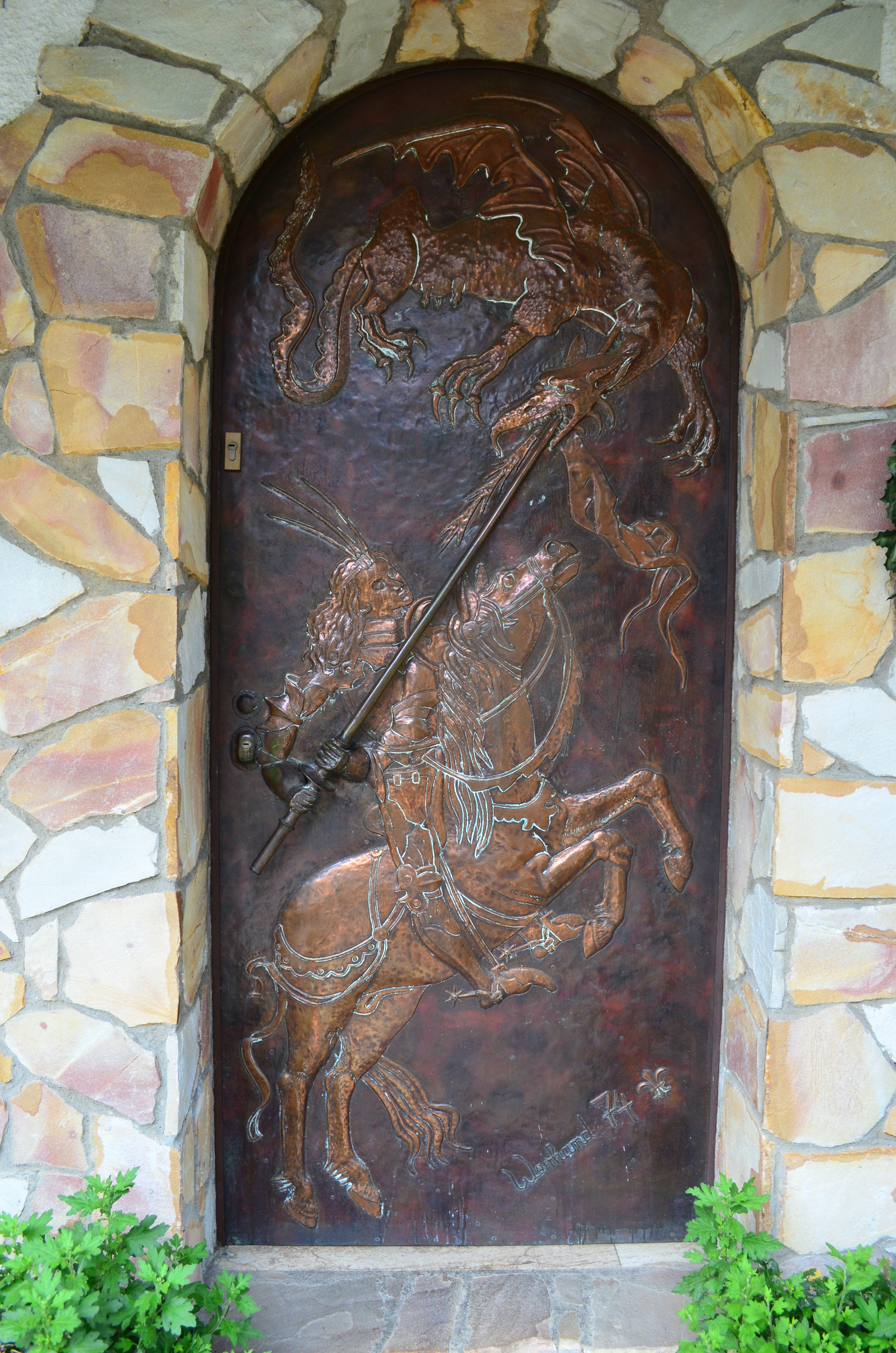
The Dragonslayer (Copper door 1974) by German artist Klaus Rudolf Werhand

=== Antiquity ===
- Apollo
- Baal
- Cadmus
- Daniel
- Drangue
- El (deity)
- Enki
- Erlang Shen
- Eurybarus
- Fereydun
- Garshasp
- Garuda
- Heracles
- Heros
- Inanna
- Indra
- Janamejaya
- Jupiter
- Li Ji
- Marduk
- Saint Martha
- Menestratus
- Michael
- Mwindo
- Ninurta
- Perseus
- Ra
- Rostam
- Saint George
- Tarḫunz
- Teshub
- Saint Theodore
- Uttanka
- Vahagn
- Yahweh
- Yu the Great
- Zeus

=== Medieval and early modern legend ===
- Bahram Gur
- Bayajidda
- Benzaiten aka Saraswati
- Beowulf
- Dieudonné de Gozon
- Dobrynya Nikitich
- E Bija e Hënës dhe e Diellit
- Făt-Frumos
- Fráech
- Gawain
- Greuceanu
- Guy of Warwick
- Haymon
- Iovan Iorgovan
- John Lambton
- Lancelot
- Margaret the Virgin
- Nezha
- Opos the Brave
- Perun
- Piers Shonks
- Prâslea the Brave
- Sigurd or Siegfried
- Skuba Dratewka/Krakus
- Susanoo
- Teodosio de Goñi
- Zjermi
- Tristan
- Dietrich von Bern
- Heinrich von Winkelried
- Wada Heita Tanenaga

=== Tolkien's legendarium ===
- Bard the Bowman
- Eärendil
- Fram
- Túrin Turambar
