= Djall =

Albanian mythological figure

Djall or Dreq is the personification of evil in Albanian mythology and folklore. The name is used also for a demon of fire. Various tales woven through the years have pitched Djall as the antagonist, the villainous element against which heroes and ordinary people alike must contend. As a symbolic representation of evil forces, Djall serves to highlight the contrasting virtues of courage, wisdom, and moral integrity in those who dare to oppose it. But Djall is no mere metaphor, in these narratives, it takes a form that can manifest in the physical world, most terrifyingly as a fire demon. This elemental characteristic adds another layer of peril to its already fearsome existence. A walking inferno, it brings both moral and mortal danger.

== Etymology ==
The name djall derives from the Latin diabolus, "devil". Alternative forms are dreqi from the Latin draco, "dragon", satan and shejtan.

== See also ==
- Dajjal
- En (deity)
- Kulshedra
- Stihi
- Verbti

== Bibliography ==
- Elsie, Robert (2001). A Dictionary of Albanian Religion, Mythology and Folk Culture. London: Hurst & Company. ISBN 1-85065-570-7.
- Lurker, Manfred (2004). The Routledge dictionary of gods and goddesses, devils and demons. Routledge.
- Novik, Alexander (2015). "Lexicon of Albanian Mythology: Areal Studies in the Polylingual Region of Azov Sea". Slavia Meridionalis. 15: 261–273. doi:10.11649/sm.2015.022.
- Orel, Vladimir (1998). Albanian etymological dictionary. Brill. ISBN 9004110240.
