= The Twins (folktale) =

Albanian fairy tale

Folk tale
- Name: The Twins
- Aarne–Thompson grouping: ATU 303, "The Twins or Blood Brothers"; ATU 300, "The Dragon Slayer"
- Mythology: Albanian
- Country: Albania, Italy
- Region: Southern Europe
- Published in: Canti tradizionali ed altri saggi delle colonie albanesi di Sicilia; Albanian Wonder Tales
- Related: "The Two Brothers"

"The Twins" (Albanian: Binoshët; Italian: I Gemelli) is an Albanian folk tale firstly recorded by Arbëreshë folklorist Giuseppe Schirò in Piana degli Albanesi and published in his 1923 book, Canti tradizionali ed altri saggi delle colonie albanesi di Sicilia, in Albanian and Italian. (Note: English: Traditional Songs and other Essays from the Albanian Colonies of Sicily.) American journalist George Post Wheeler published an English translation of a similar tale from Albania in his 1936 book, Albanian Wonder Tales, entitling his version "The Boy who was Brother to the Drague", with the same twin protagonists but also including a drangue as a blood brother of one of the twins.

The tale is Aarne–Thompson–Uther Index type 303, "The Twins or Blood Brothers," and includes ATU type 300 ("The Dragon Slayer"). In The Folktale (1946), Stith Thompson indicated four Albanian reported versions of "The Twins or Blood Brothers".

Gerlando Bennici recorded and published a shorter variant in Albanian and Italian, I due gemelli fatati, (Note: English: "The Two Fairy Twins".) by Giuseppe Pitrè in his 1875 Fiabe, novelle e racconti popolari siciliani. (Note: English: Sicilian Fairy Tales, Stories, and Folktales.) This version does not include the ATU 300 "dragon slayer" type.

"The Twins" includes common Albanian mythological figures such as the ora, zana, kulshedra, shtriga, and e Bukura e Dheut ("the Earthly Beauty"). The story also features the traditional Albanian motif of the "pair of heroic brothers", one of the main themes in the Albanian epic cycle of the Kângë Kreshnikësh (Songs of Heroes). The protagonists are twins Zjerma (Zjermi (Note: English: "fire", see also Zjarri.) in Wheeler's version) and Handa; (Note: English: "moon", see also Hëna.) one is born with the Sun (Dielli) on his forehead, and the other has the Moon (Hëna). After their father dies, they decide to travel the world with their two horses and two dogs in search of glory and riches.

== Story ==
=== The twins' birth ===
A king loses his kingdom. All that remains of his wealth are two gold rings, each adorned with a gem, a mare, a brave female dog, and a vegetable garden where he lives with his wife. He spends his days hoeing the garden, while his wife spins linen and wool. They are happy in the quiet of the fields and the tranquility of a solitary life. The only thing they miss is having a son. One morning, the king goes to the seashore and catches a large, red fish. He discovers that the red fish is magical and can speak. The fish tells the king to divide the fish's body into four pieces: the side of the head, the middle, the tail, and the bones. It instructs the king to give his wife the side of the head, eat the middle part himself, feed the tail to the mare and the dog, and bury the bones in the garden. The king follows the fish's instructions. His wife gives birth to two male twins, Zjerma (Note: The term zjerma is the archaic form of Albanian zjarm, which means "fire", see also Zjarri.) and Handa; (Note: The term handa is the archaic form of Albanian hana, which means "moon", see also Hëna).) one has the Sun (Dielli) on his forehead, and the other has the Moon (Hëna). The mare gives birth to two foals, the dog two puppies, and two silver swords appear in the garden. The king's wife raises her twins carefully. The king teaches them to ride their horses without a saddle, fight with a variety of weapons, and hunt in the mountains and forests.

=== The king dies and the twins leave ===
When the twins are nineteen years old, the king becomes ill and realizes that he was joined by the ora. He summons his sons to his bedside, reminding them that they have royal blood, to love each other, to take care of their mother, and to do good. Before dying, he gives each of them one of his gold rings. They bury him with his weapons, mourning him for nine days and nights. The queen grieves for her husband, but her sons comfort her as they promised their father. After mourning, the queen returns to spinning linen and wool; the brothers hire a farmer to work in the garden, and his wife does the housework.

A year later, Zjerma tells Handa that he wants to travel the world to win fame and conquer their father's kingdom so they could regain their ancestors' glory. He suggests girding their silver swords, mounting their steeds, taking their two dogs (who are unafraid to attack a drangue), and leaving their home. He is unconcerned about their mother, who is old but healthy and has people helping her. Handa accepts his brother's proposal, so they say goodbye to their mother and leave with the horses and dogs.

On their journey, they come to a water source at the foot of a flowering almond tree where the road splits. They decide to separate and follow their fate according to the choice of the horses, vowing to reunite there every year on the same day. If one of the twins was in danger and needed help from the other, the gem in the ring would lose its brightness and turn black. The two brothers hug each other; Zjerma's horse takes the right path, and Handa's the left.

=== Zjerma's journey ===
==== Kulshedra: the seven-headed dragon ====
After a few days, Zjerma comes to a city whose streets are empty and houses shuttered. He approaches the temple of the Sun (Dielli), where he sees an old man crying. Zjerma asks the old man what is going on. The man says that the kulshedra had blocked the source of the river about a month earlier; the heroes who tried to kill the monster all died. The elders suggested that the king bargain with the monster to release the water. The kulshedra offers to release the water if she receives an offering of a beautiful maiden daily. The old man says that his daughter had been sent the day before and the king's daughter, Bardhakuqja, had been sent that day. The king promises his daughter in marriage to whoever slays the dragon.

Zjerma promises the old man that he will avenge his daughter, and leaves with his animal companions. He reaches a dark river valley in the mountains. The source of the river is a deep, wide abyss where the monster lives. The princess is tied to a boulder, almost lifeless. Zjerma's blood stirs in his veins when he sees the still-radiant princess, who sees him and tells him to leave to save his life. Zjerma refuses, dismounts, and frees the princess. Exhausted, he rests his head on the princess' knees and falls asleep.

At noon, the water begins to move and the princess realizes that the kulshedra is about to emerge. Not wanting to wake Zjerma, she begins to cry. A tear falls on Zjerma's face and awakens him; he mounts his horse and brandishes the silver sword, waiting for the monster. The water boils, and from it the seven heads of the kulshedra emerge; the central one is horned, with a seven-pointed crown. Poison flows through her teeth; her forked tongues hiss, and her mouths spit fire. When the kulshedra jumps to the ground, Zjerma sees that her body is like a giant lizard's with segmented armor made of steel-hard bone. Her serpentine tail has nine knots, covered with hard scales. Her legs are short, wide and strong, with curved claws as hard as iron. On her back she has a fish-type fin which opens and closes with antennae like boar tusks. She has wings like a bat, nine times larger than those of a hawk.

==== Dragon-slayer ====
When the kulshedra is about to pounce, Zjerma and his horse approach her; Zjerma's dog follows. Zjerma attacks the monster, while his dog bites her behind. The kulshedra writhes, spitting flames. She hisses, trying to bite her enemies and crush them with her tail. The horse tramples her, denting her bony armor and breaking the scales protecting her body. Zjerma cuts off her heads with his sword, but the heads reattach to the monster's bloody necks; he realizes that he will have to cut off her central head to kill her. A dark cloud covers the valley, with thunder and lightning. Zjerma cuts off the kusheldra's central head; a torrent of boiling black blood and flames erupt from the monster's neck, accompanied by a loud screech. The cloud dissipates, the sun shines, and the river begins to flow again.

Zjerma cuts off the kulshedra's tongues and puts them in his saddlebag with her crowned head. He washes himself in the river with his horse and dog. Zjerma helps the princess mount the horse and brings her back to the city, where he is greeted with celebrations and honors. Meanwhile, Barkulku ("Wolfbelly") passes the source of the river and sees the dead kulshedra. Not knowing what had happened, he cuts off the remaining heads and put them in a sack in the hope of receiving a reward. Barkulku arrives in the city when Zjerma and Bardhakuqja are being married. He approaches the throne, announces that he has killed the kulshedra, and claims the reward. The king asks him to substantiate his claim, and Barkulku pulls out the heads of the kulshedra. Zjerma points out that the crowned head and tongues are missing, and takes them out of his saddlebag. The king swears by the Sun that if Barkulku has no other arguments to defend himself, he will give the order to burn him. Barkulku attacks Zjerma, and the dragonslayer kills him.

When Zjerma and Bardhakuqja are about to put garlands on their heads, Zjerma realizes that the gem on his ring has darkened. He stops the ceremony, saying that he must leave immediately. Zjerma kisses his bride, telling her to wait for him for a year, a month and a day; if he has not returned, she will be free to remarry. He says goodbye, and leaves with his horse and dog to rescue his brother.

=== Handa's journey ===
After leaving his brother, Handa and his animal companions cross plains, hills and mountains before reaching a dense forest. He proceeds with difficulty, cutting through the vegetation to make his way. When the forest thins out, Handa sees a hut near a stream where an old man is resting. They greet each other, and the man advises Handa not to continue because he will face risks worse than death. Handa says that he must follow his destiny, and continues. Handa arrives in the garden of the Zanas. White-clothed nymphs welcome him with laughter, songs and dances, charming the young man with kisses and caresses. They tell him that e Bukura e Dheut ("the Earthly Beauty") lives in the cave at the foot of the mountain. Inebriated, Handa wants to find the Earthly Beauty.

He leaves the Zanas, arriving with his horse and dog at the entrance of a garden surrounded by a hedge of brambles and briars. An old woman asks him what he is looking for; Handa replies that he wants to meet (and marry) the Earthly Beauty. The old woman allows him to enter if he passes a test of intelligence, sword-wielding and riding ability. The test consists of solving a riddle, cutting a woolen bow in two, and climbing over the hedge onto his horse's back without touching it. Handa fails all of them. The witch sprays him, his horse, and his dog with an herbal ointment which turns them into stone; Zjerma then notices the darkening of his ring.

==== Rescue by Zjerma ====
Zjerma reaches the source under the flowering almond tree, follows the path Handa had taken, and arrives at the old man's hut. The old man tells Zjerma that his brother followed the path leading to the garden of the Earthly Beauty; he tried to convince Handa not to go, but he did not listen. The old man says that before meeting Handa, he saw many other men take the same path and never return. The wise old man invites Zjerma into his hut, where he shares secret teachings to help save Handa. Zjerma says goodbye to the old man and leaves. In the garden of the Zanas, the nymphs try to entertain him with songs and dances. He does not stop, telling them that they are very beautiful but not for him.

At the entrance of the garden of the Earthly Beauty, Zjerma meets the witch and accepts her challenge. He solves the witch's riddle, uses the silver sword to cut the woolen bow in two, and jumps the hedge with his horse. Before the witch sprays the herbal ointment on him, he catches her and ties her to a tree. Zjerma threatens to kill her if she does not show him his brother. Trembling, she shows him many petrified men (including Handa). He asks the witch to tell him how to bring his brother back to life. She tells Zjerma to anoint Handa's eyes and lips with the dew from the calyx of the white lily. Unable to find the flower, he orders the witch to tell him where it is and she obeys. Finding the flower, Zjerma sprinkles its dew on Handa's eyes and lips. When Handa comes back to life, Zjerma embraces him. He then sprinkles the dew on Handa's animal companions and the other men. When Zjerma wakes everyone else up, the witch yells at him to stop but he ignores her. Enraged, she transforms herself into a black bolla and tries to free herself by twisting her body. The witch clings to a nearby tree and tries to uproot the tree to which she is tied. She fails; her body splits in two, and she dies.

When the petrified men come back to life, the twins realize that they were all brave young noblemen. Handa suggests that he and the other men compete in a tournament for the Earthly Beauty's hand. To show Zjerma their gratitude for saving their lives, they allow Handa to marry the Earthly Beauty without a fight. Zjerma asks the men to follow him and Handa when they visit the Beauty, and they accept. The twins and their followers arrive at the Earthly Beauty's cave and find her in the shade of a vine and a cypress tree, surrounded by her maids. She greets them, and offers her hand to Handa. The Earthly Beauty's eyes are lighter than the Moon, and as bright as Venus. Zjerma makes two laurel wreaths, and places them on the Earthly Beauty and Handa's heads. A nine-day celebration follows.

=== The twins' kingdoms ===
Zjerma gathers his companions and invites them to help free the kingdom of the twins' ancestors from foreign domination. Everyone agrees, and leaves for the war. Although the twins' army is small, their strength – comparable to that of a drangue – allows them to prevail for several months. When the foreign king realizes that he can no longer win or save himself, he joins his army in combat. Handa kills the king with his silver sword. Heir of his father-in-law's throne, Zjerma leaves Handa what he owed of his ancestor's crown and recognizes his brother as king. The twins retrieve their mother and return her to her kingdom. Zjerma and his army then go to the Earthly Beauty's cave to bring her to his brother. After the long journey, he becomes ill. The last day for Zjerma to return to Bardhakuqja approaches; too weak to get out of bed, he sends Handa.

When Handa arrives in the city freed by his brother, he is mistaken for Zjerma and celebrated. Forced to go to bed with his sister-in-law, he tells her who he is and places his sword between them. In the morning, a recovered Zjerma arrives unexpectedly. He enters the room and sees Handa and Bardhakuqja in bed together. Feeling betrayed, he considers killing them in their sleep before he sees Handa's silver sword separating them. Realizing what happened, he laughs; this awakens Handa and Bardhakuqja. The twins go with Bardhakuqja to Handa's kingdom, where Bardhakuqja meets their mother and Handa's wife; after three months, Zjerma and his wife return home. Since Zjerma's father-in-law is very old and wants to rest, he give his throne to Zjerma and places the gold crown on his head.

== The Boy who was Brother to the Drague ==
In Wheeler's version the characters and their actions are almost the same: Zjermi, Handa, their parents, Bardhakuqja, Barkulku, e Bukura e Dheut, kulshedra, shtriga (witch), the unpetrified companions, etc. A difference between Schirò's and Wheeler's versions is the absence of the zanas (nymphs) in Wheeler's version that, on the other hand, includes drangues. A wounded drangue called Zef is rescued by Zjermi before reaching the city that is harmed by the kulshedra. Zjermi and Zef become blood brothers, and when Zjermi fights the kulshedra, Zef and other drangues come in his aid striking the kulshedra with thunders and weakening her before she is slain by Zjermi. Also the event about Zjermi's temporary replacement by Handa is absent in Wheeler's version.

== Classification ==
The tale is Aarne–Thompson–Uther Index type 303 (The Twins or Blood Brothers), incorporating ATU type 300 (The Dragon Slayer). Instead of the rise of a young man from humble circumstances found in variants from other traditions, the Albanian version is about two brothers who regain their father's kingdom. The theme of reconquering a father's kingdom is also found in some Sicilian versions.

It includes the following elements of Thompson's motif-index:

- T511.5.1, Conception from eating fish
- T589.7.1, Simultaneous birth of [domestic] animal and child
- D1076, Magic ring (Note: Two magic rings which change color.)
- D231, Transformation of man to stone
- D885.1, Magic object recovered with witch's help
- K1311.1, Husband's twin brother mistaken by woman for her husband
- T351, Sword of chastity

== Variant in Pitrè's collection ==
Giuseppe Pitrè published a shorter version in Albanian and Italian in his 1875 Fiabe, novelle e racconti popolari siciliani (Sicilian Fairy Tales, Stories, and Folktales), entitled "I due gemelli fatati" ("The Two Fairy Twins"). Gerlando Bennici originally recorded this version. It includes the first part of the twins' magic birth (also found in Schiro's version), consisting of Thompson's motifs T511.5.1, "Conception from eating fish" and T589.7.1, "Simultaneous birth of [domestic] animal and child", but omits the king's death and the magic rings (Thompson's motif D1076) which allow one twin to know the other's condition. The dragon-slayer who frees the princess (ATU type 300) is replaced by the tournament organized by the king; this corresponds to Thompson's motif H1561.1, "Tests of valor: tournament", which is based on ATU 314.

== Similar tales ==
- The Two Brothers
- The Knights of the Fish
- Zjarri (Albanian paganism)
- E Bija e Hënës dhe e Diellit
- Little Constantine
- Kângë Kreshnikësh
- Zana (mythology)
- Perseus
- Andromeda (mythology)
- Princess and dragon
