= Kulshedra =

Demon in Albanian mythology and folklore

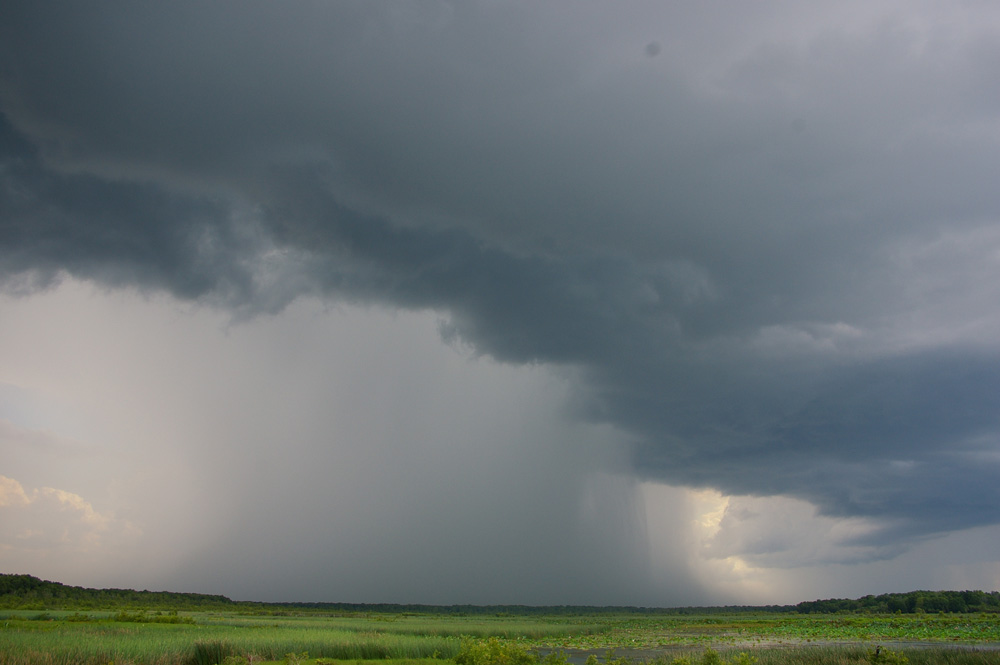
When the weather turns foul, black clouds gather and heavy storms break, kulshedra is believed to be in the vicinity. A drangue can counter her destructive power driving the storms away.

The kulshedra or kuçedra is a water, storm, fire and chthonic demon in Albanian mythology and folklore, usually described as a huge multi-headed female serpentine dragon. She is the archetype of darkness and evil, the complementary and opposing force to drangue, the archetype of light and good. The kulshedra is believed to spit fire, cause drought, storms, flooding, earthquakes and other natural disasters against mankind.

In Albanian mythology she is usually fought and defeated by a drangue, who is a semi-human winged divine hero and protector of mankind, the most widespread Albanian culture hero. Heavy thunderstorms are thought to be the result of most of their battles. Others include earthquakes, volcanic eruptions and cyclones. In Albanian traditions kulshedra is also fought and defeated by other celestial heroes and heroines, like the Daughter of the Moon and the Sun (E Bija e Hënës dhe e Diellit) who tries to protect her loved one by using her light powers, or other heroic characters marked in their bodies by the symbols of celestial objects, such as Zjermi (lit. "the Fire"), who notably is born with the Sun (Dielli) on his forehead.

The legendary battle of a heroic deity associated with thunder and weather – like drangue – who fights and slays a huge multi-headed serpent associated with water, storms, and drought – like kulshedra – is a common motif of Indo-European mythology. The original legend may have symbolized the Chaoskampf, a clash between forces of order and chaos. In Albanian mythology the legendary battle between drangue and kulshedra is the most famous representation of the dualistic struggle between good and evil, light and darkness, a conflict that symbolises the cyclic return in the watery and chthonian world of death, accomplishing the cosmic renewal of rebirth.

In northern beliefs, the kulshedra can take possession of the sun and moon. In southern beliefs, she is described as an enormous female serpent who surrounds the world. According to this version, if she were ever to touch her tail with her mouth, she could destroy the whole world. It is said that she requires human sacrifices for accepting to postpone the natural disasters and catastrophes. Every year she asked for a specific number of young boys and girls from villages (each version has a different number) and every year they never came back until she fought the daughter of the Moon and Sun who ended it for once and for all

According to folk beliefs, the kulshedra's earlier stage is the bolla, which takes the form of demonic serpent possessing both chthonic and aquatic attributes. The bolla's eyes remain shut for the whole year except on Saint George's Day, when it gazes at the world and upon which it will devour any human on sight. The bolla will eventually develop into a kulshedra if it should manage to live for the prescribed number of years without being seen by a human. The bollar and errshaja are considered intermediate forms of this serpent as it goes through a series of metamorphoses. These terms also signify serpents; the term bullar merely being a synonym for bolla in Southern Albania. In some regions the kulshedra is depicted like a female eel, turtle, frog, lizard or salamander. There are many tales of brave villagers who dared kill them in their sleep before they became a greater risk.

The kulshedra can also appear disguised as a woman, who keeps her true nature hidden (the devil in disguise). As a semi-human divine figure, she holds also positive qualities that emerge indirectly from Albanian folk tales, beliefs and rituals. It is said that the village where the kulshedra lives has great prosperity in agriculture and livestock. Indeed, she absorbs by her breath foodstuffs from everywhere, and her village thrives, while the affected villages become poor and do not prosper. The children of Kulshedra are known as Shlligë and are known to cause storms everywhere they appear. According to folk beliefs people used to practice sacrifices to her so she could bring them good and stop any harmful action.

== Names ==
The term bolla derives from Proto-Albanian *bālwā. It could also be of Pre-indo-European origins alongside Ancient Greek πελώριον (pelórion).

Kulshedra (kulshedër; def. kulshedra) or kuçedër (def. kuçedra) derives from the Latin chersydrus (from Greek χέρσυδρος) roughly meaning an "amphibious snake".

The term bullar is given as a Southern Albanian variant by some sources.

== Physical appearance and attributes ==
=== Bolla ===
The bolla is said to remain closed-eyed until Saint George's Day, where it peers into the world, and will devour any human that approaches it. It is explained in folklore that Saint George had cursed the beast to be forever blind except on his feast day.

=== Kulshedra ===
Kulshedra is generally considered to be a female dragon, like a multi-headed serpent form, but it is known to have pendulous drooping breasts touching the ground, thus some German commentators have stated she might be also regarded as a hag. Kulshedra is furthermore said to be covered in wooly red hair, have a long tail, and have seven to twelve heads. It is also said to spit fire. Kulshedra's milk and urine are both considered poisonous. Kulshedra can also appear in the guise of a human female; its appearance in an ordinary woman's guise known locally for example in Dukagjini, Kosovo. It may also appear in the form of a female lizard, turtle, frog, or salamander.

At the same time, kulshedra is widely considered to be a storm demon. Kulshedra is believed to cause drought and other water-related issues for humanity such as torrents, tempests, water shortages, big storms, flooding, or other natural disasters. Often to placate it, a human sacrifice must be made, as witnessed in the tale of the hero Qerosi ("Scurfhead"). (Note: Uhlisch, Gerda (1987), Die Schone der Erde, p. 154, cited by Elsie.)

In southern beliefs, she is described as an enormous female serpent who surrounds the world. According to this version, if she were ever to touch her tail with her mouth, she could destroy the whole world. In northern beliefs, the kulshedra can take possession of the sun and moon. To frighten the evil demon, the Albanian tribesmen used to shoot in the sky or provoke great noise with metal objects, even by ringing the church bells.

"The male form, called Kulshedër, acts as a devil".

=== Metamorphosis ===
According to folk belief, a snake after living a certain number of years will metamorphosize into a bolla and eventually become the monstrous kulshedra. The belief that an ancient snake becomes a dragon is not unique to Albanian culture, and similar beliefs can be found for example in Hungary and Romania, as pointed out by Robert Elsie.

In the Kosovan city of Pristina, the kulshedra begins life as a being invisible to mankind for the first twelve years of its life, after which it turns into a bolla ("a kind of serpent"), and afterwards it sprouts wings, becomes hairy, and begins to combat the drangue (dragúa). But the folklore of Malësia and the Northern Mountain Range in Albania provides a more complex life cycle: when the serpent manages to live fifty years without being noticed by anyone, it becomes a bullar, a reptile that feeds milk to snakes, from which these snake derive their venom. If it lives another fifty years without being seen, it becomes an ershaj which coils around its human victim's neck, punctures his chest and eats the heart. When an ershaj (er̄šaj) lives for another century unseen, it finally becomes a kulshedra.

In Tirana, a kulshedra was said to begin life as a being hiding in a dark hole which became a snake after six months; the snake must grow an additional six months before it exhibited the behavior for which it could be properly called a kulshedra. Among the Albanian Kastrati tribe, it was believed that a snake sighted by a wren lost its ability to transform into a kulshedra.

== Mythology ==
=== Dualistic worldview, cosmic renewal ===
Albanian beliefs, myths and legends are organized around the dualistic struggle between good and evil, light and darkness, which cyclically produces the cosmic renewal.

The most famous Albanian mythological representation of the dualistic struggle between good and evil, light and darkness, is the constant battle between drangue and kulshedra, a conflict that symbolises the cyclic return in the watery and chthonian world of death, accomplishing the cosmic renewal of rebirth. The legendary battle of a heroic deity associated with thunder and weather – like drangue – who fights and slays a huge multi-headed serpent associated with water, storms, and drought – like kulshedra – is a common motif of Indo-European mythology. The original legend may have symbolized the Chaoskampf, a clash between forces of order and chaos. In Albanian tradition the clash between drangue and kulshedra, light and darkness, is furthermore seen as a mythological representation of the cult of the Sun (Dielli) and the Moon (Hëna), widely observed in Albanian traditional tattooing.

In Albanian mythology and folklore, the supremacy of the deity of the sky over that of the underworld is symbolized by the victory of celestial divine heroes against kulshedra (often described as an earthly/chthonic deity or demon). Those celestial divine heroes are often drangue (the most widespread culture hero among Albanians), but also E Bija e Hënës dhe e Diellit ("the Daughter of the Moon and the Sun") who is described as pika e qiellit ("drop of the sky" or "lightning") which falls everywhere from heaven on the mountains and the valleys and strikes pride and evil, or other heroic characters marked in their bodies by the symbols of celestial objects, such as Zjermi (lit. "the Fire"), who notably is born with the Sun on his forehead.

=== Battles with Dragùa ===
Dragùa, sometimes called drangue or drangoni, is the male conqueror of the female monster kulshedra, whom he must fight to the death in collective beliefs. Their prime aim in life is to combat and slay Kulshedras. They thus spend much of their youth exercising and running around, so as to learn how to avoid kulshedra's urine and milk. When they sense a Kulshedra approaching, dragùas "go completely berserk and their souls depart from their bodies in preparation for the coming battle". When a human is attacked the dragùa will "fly to their assistance and slay kulshedra by pelting it with cudgels, ploughs, yokes, lances and stones, and even with uprooted trees and houses. Such attacks are seen by humans as lightning". Heavy thunderstorms are thought to be the result of the battle.

The dragùas, even as infants, use the cradle to shield themselves from kulshedra's attacks, which consist of her urine and poisonous milk from her breasts. They also use this cradle as a weapon.

In the Northern Albania, the two are envisioned as battling perpetually in the bend of the Drani River in the Northern Mountain Range. But some folklore speaks of the dragùa accomplishing kulshedra's destruction by drowning, and in Central Albania, the hero is said to have drowned her, knocking her unconscious by throwing trees and boulders at her, and afterwards drowning her in Shkumbin, a river in central Albania.

Dragùas are not the only beings said to have defeated Kulshedra. There are multiple folktales (see: Folktales and other stories with Kulshedra) in which saints and folktale heroes not identified as dragùa have defeated Kulshedra.

== Folktales and other stories with Bolla/Kulshedra ==
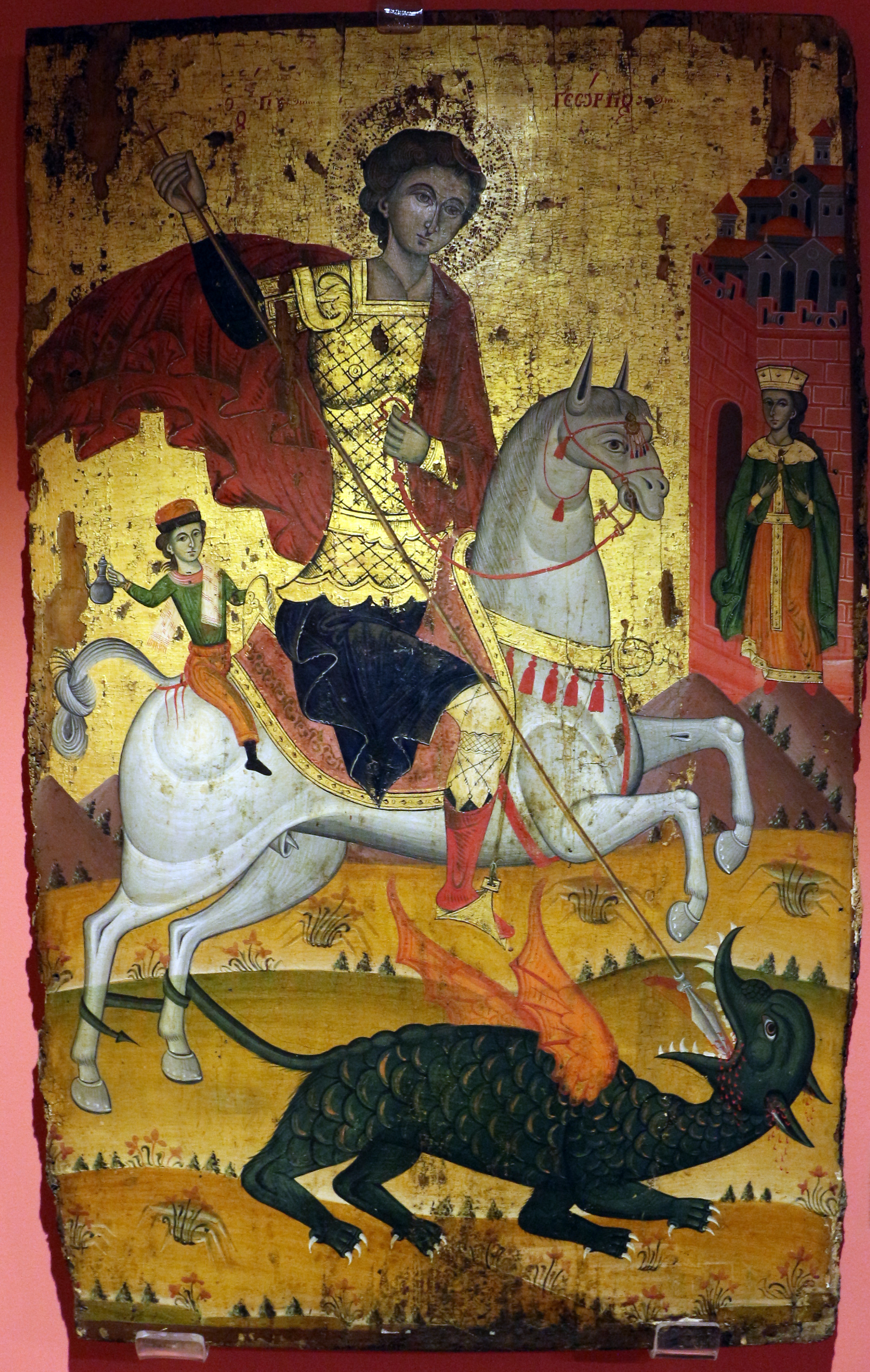
18th-century icon of Saint George and the Dragon by Çetiri brothers, from Ardenica Monastery, now in the National Museum of Medieval Art in Tirana.

Saint George and Saint Elias (originally the Old Testament prophet Elijah) both have stories in which they fight (and defeat) a Bolla/Kulshedra. Saint Elias, in particular, is identified in some regions with the Dragùa and is also a weather god and provides protection against storms and fire.

Some folktales involving the slaying of a Kulshedra include:

- "The Daughter of the Moon and the Sun": the kulshedra is slain by The Daughter of the Moon and the Sun, whose weapon is a point of light
- "The Twins" (Binoshët): the kulshedra is slain by Zjerma, one of the twins (the other being Handa), whose weapons are silver swords. In a variant, before slaying the kulshedra Zjermi is helped by his blood brother, a drangue called Zef, with the aid of other fellow drangues
- "The three friends and the Earthly Beauty"
- "The three brothers and the three sisters"
- "The Youth and the Maiden with Stars on their Foreheads and Crescents on their Breasts"
- "The girl who became a boy"
- "The Snake and the King's Daughter"
- "The barefaced man and the Pasha's brother"
- "The maiden who was promised to the sun"
- "Shamakadija": the titular Shamakadija is the son of a kuçedra, and marries a human princess.

== Other mentions of Bolla/Kulshedra ==
On the Greek island Poros, once inhabited by a majority of Arvanites, the term Bullar is still used to describe water snakes, and in northern Albania, both Bolla and Bollar are used to describe grass snakes.

== See also ==
- Albanian folklore
- Balaur, a similar figure in Romanian folklore
- Chaoskampf
- Djall, a devil-like figure in Albanian folklore
- Drangue
- Illuyanka
- Lernaean Hydra, a similar figure in Greek mythology
- Ljubi
- Ouroboros
- Stihi

== Sources ==
=== Bibliography ===
- Doja, Albert [in Albanian] (2005), "Mythology and Destiny" (PDF), Anthropos, 100 (2): 449–462, doi:10.5771/0257-9774-2005-2-449, S2CID 115147696. JSTOR 40466549
- Elsie, Robert (1994). Albanian Folktales and Legends. Naim Frashëri Publishing Company. Archived from the original (pdf) on 2009-07-28.
- Elsie, Robert (2000), "The Christian Saints of Albania". Balkanistica. 13: 35–57.
- Elsie, Robert (2001a), A Dictionary of Albanian Religion, Mythology, and Folk Culture, NYU Press, pp. 46–48, ISBN 978-0-8147-2214-5.
- Elsie, Robert (2001b), Albanian Folktales and Legends, Dukagjini Pub. House
- Fishta, Gjergj; Elsie, Robert; Mathie-Heck, Janice (2005). The highland lute: (Lahuta e malcís): the Albanian national epic. Centre for Albanian Studies (London, England). I.B.Tauris. ISBN 1-84511-118-4.
- Lambertz, Maximilian (1922). Albanische Märchen und andere Texte zur albanischen Volkskunde. Akademie der Wissenschaften in Wien. Schriften der Balkankommission. Linguistische Abt. XII. Wien: Alfred Hölder. hdl:2027/inu.30000115238242.
- Lelaj, Olsi (2015). "Mbi tatuazhin në shoqërinë shqiptare" [On Tattoo in the Albanian Society]. Kultura Popullore. 34 (71–72). Centre of Albanological Studies: 91–118. ISSN 2309-5717.
- Lurker, Manfred [in German] (2015-04-29). A Dictionary of Gods and Goddesses, Devils and Demons. Routledge. p. 66. ISBN 978-1-136-10620-0. ISBN 978-1-136-10620-0
- Pipa, Arshi (1993). "The Mythology of Albania". In Bonnefoy, Yves (ed.). American, African, and Old European mythologies. University of Chicago Press. ISBN 0-226-06457-3.
- Poghirc, Cicerone (1987). "Albanian Religion". In Mircea Eliade (ed.). The Encyclopedia of Religion. Vol. 1. New York: MacMillan Publishing Co. pp. 178–180.
- Schirò, Giuseppe (1923). Canti tradizionali ed altri saggi delle colonie albanesi di Sicilia. Stab. tip. L. Pierro.
- Shuteriqi, Dhimitër S. (1959). Historia e letërsisë shqipe. Vol. 1. Universiteti Shtetëror i Tiranës, Instituti i Historisë dhe Gjuhësisë.
- Tirta, Mark (2004). Petrit Bezhani (ed.). Mitologjia ndër shqiptarë (in Albanian). Tirana: Mësonjëtorja. ISBN 99927-938-9-9.
- Treimer, Karl (1971). "Zur Rückerschliessung der illyrischen Götterwelt und ihre Bedeutung für die südslawische Philologie". In Henrik Barić (ed.). Arhiv za Arbanasku starinu, jezik i etnologiju. Vol. I. R. Trofenik. pp. 27–33.
- West, Morris L. (2007). Indo-European Poetry and Myth. Oxford University Press. ISBN 978-0-19-928075-9.
- Watkins, Calvert (1995). How to Kill a Dragon: Aspects of Indo-European Poetics. London: Oxford University Press. ISBN 978-0-19-514413-0.
