= Drangue =

Albanian semi-human winged divine hero

The drangùe (Albanian definite form: drangùa, drangòni) is a semi-human winged divine hero in Albanian pagan mythology, associated with weather and storms. He is the archetype of light and good, the complementary and opposing force to kulshedra, the archetype of darkness and evil. Babies destined to become drangue are born with their heads covered in caul and with two or sometimes four wings under their arms. The drangue hold supernatural powers, especially in the wings and arms. A drangùe is made invulnerable by the singular conjunction produced at his birth, and can die only if this conjunction is repeated once again.

The main goal of the drangue is to fight the kulshedra in legendary battles. In order to defeat the kulshedra he uses lightning-swords and thunderbolts as his most powerful weapons, but he also uses meteoric stones, piles of trees and rocks, eventually protecting mankind from storms, fire, droughts, floods and other natural disasters caused by kulshedra's destructive power. Heavy thunderstorms are thought to be the result of their battles. The drangue and their myth are extensively and accurately portrayed in the Albanian folk tale "The Boy who was Brother to the Drague".

Drangue features the attributes of a sky and lightning deity, apparently an Albanian reflection of the Indo-European sky god (Zojz in Albanian tradition). The legendary battle of a heroic deity associated with thunder and weather – like drangue – who fights and slays a huge multi-headed serpent associated with water, storms, and drought – like kulshedra – is a common motif of Indo-European mythology. The original legend may have symbolized the Chaoskampf, a clash between forces of order and chaos. In Albanian mythology the legendary battle between drangue and kulshedra is the most famous representation of the dualistic struggle between good and evil, light and darkness, a conflict that symbolises the cyclic return in the watery and chthonian world of death, accomplishing the cosmic renewal of rebirth.

== Name and etymology ==
Standard Albanian form of the name is dragùa (def. dragói). A common dialectal variant is drangue. Durham recorded the form drangoni.

The Albanian term drangùe/dragùa is related to drangë, drëngë, drëngëzë, "a small fresh-water fish that does not grow very big", and to Gheg Albanian drãng, "kitten, puppy, cub", generally used for a "wild baby animal", most likely related to the singular birth conditions of this mythological figure. In Albanian tradition, there are two semantic features of the term dragùa. Some of the earliest Albanian works includes the term dragùa to describe a dragon or hydra-like monster, such as found in Roman mythology and in Balkan folklore. With the same meaning other old sources use instead the term kulshedra. The other semantic sense of the term dragùa, which is widespread in collective Albanian beliefs, is that of a hero battling the Kulshedra, a mythological tradition already attested in the 17th century Albanian texts, such as the 1635 Dictionarium Latino-Epiroticum by Frang Bardhi. The term drangue is also used in some Albanian dialects (including also the Arbëresh) with the meaning of "lion" and "noble animal".

== Physical appearance and attributes ==
The drangues are semi-human divine warriors with extraordinary strength, giving them the ability to tear trees out of the ground and throw large boulders at their enemies. They can also cast lightning bolts and meteors, or whole houses.

The wings and arms of a dragùa are thought to be the source of his power and if their bodies are dissected, a golden heart with a jewel in the middle of it will be found.

As warrior fighting the kulshedra, he is armed with the "beam of the plow and the plow-share", or a "pitchfork and the post from the threshing floor, and with the big millstones". He also employs his cradle as a shield to parry blows from the kulshedra.

These heroes may live unnoticed among humans and are thought to be "invulnerable, untouchable, and undefeatable". They have "supernatural powers which become apparent while they are still babies in their cradles. When thunder and lightning strike Dragùas assemble with their cradles at the Dragùa gathering place".

In southeastern Albanian regions of Pogradec and Korça, the dragùa is "envisaged.. as a beautiful strong horse with wings, who defends civilization and mankind".

"Male animals can also be born as dragùas. Black rams will attack a Kulshedra with their horns, and black roosters will furiously pick out its eyes. Only billy goats can never be dragùas".

== Mythology ==
=== Dualistic worldview, cosmic renewal ===
Albanian beliefs, myths and legends are organized around the dualistic struggle between good and evil, light and darkness, which cyclically produces the cosmic renewal.

The most famous Albanian mythological representation of the dualistic struggle between good and evil, light and darkness, is the constant battle between drangue and kulshedra, a conflict that symbolises the cyclic return in the watery and chthonian world of death, accomplishing the cosmic renewal of rebirth. The legendary battle of a heroic deity associated with thunder and weather – like drangue – who fights and slays a huge multi-headed serpent associated with water, storms, and drought – like kulshedra – is a common motif of Indo-European mythology. The original legend may have symbolized the Chaoskampf, a clash between forces of order and chaos. In Albanian tradition the clash between drangue and kulshedra, light and darkness, is furthermore seen as a mythological representation of the cult of the Sun (Dielli) and the Moon (Hëna), widely observed in Albanian traditional tattooing.

In Albanian mythology and folklore, the supremacy of the deity of the sky over that of the underworld is symbolized by the victory of celestial divine heroes against kulshedra (often described as an earthly/chthonic deity or demon). Those celestial divine heroes are often drangue (the most widespread culture hero among Albanians), but also E Bija e Hënës dhe e Diellit ("the Daughter of the Moon and the Sun") who is described as pika e qiellit ("drop of the sky" or "lightning") which falls everywhere from heaven on the mountains and the valleys and strikes pride and evil, or other heroic characters marked in their bodies by the symbols of celestial objects, such as Zjermi (lit. "the Fire"), who notably is born with the Sun on his forehead.

=== Drangue's birth ===
A drangùe is made invulnerable by the singular conjunction produced at his birth, and can die only if this conjunction is repeated once again. However in some parts of Kosovo, such as Rugova it is believed that drangue's die when they are seen by somebody other than their mothers. They can also die if their condition is known by somebody else besides their mothers.

Babies destined to become dragùa are born "wearing shirts" and qeleshes, with two or four wings under their arms. This notion that the predestined hero are born "in a chemise" does not refer to them literally wearing articles of clothing; rather, these are babies born with their heads covered in caul, or amniotic membrane.

In some regions (such as Celza parish), it is said that dragùa babies are only born to parents whose lineage have not committed adultery for three generations, or from mothers who were kulshedras.

=== Battle with kulshedra ===
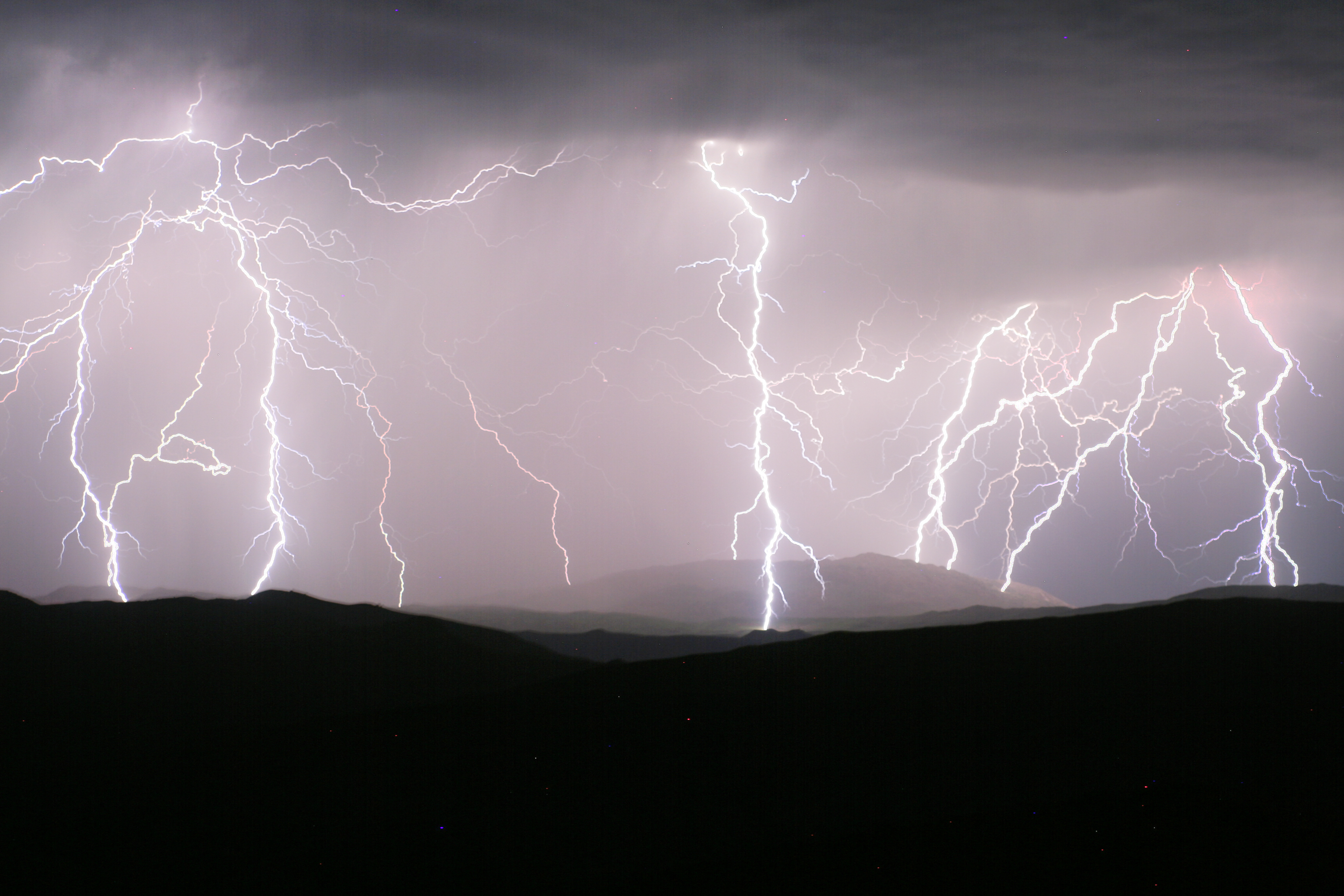
Heavy thunderstorms are believed to be the result of the battles waged between the drangùe and the kulshedra.

Thunderstorms are conceived as battles between the drangues and the kulshedras, the roll of thunder taken to be the sounds of their weapons clashing. This shares many similarities with chaoskampf, a mythological trope of the Proto-Indo-European religion, where a Storm God battles a many-headed Sea Serpent. Drangues are believed to perpetually battle with the Kulshedra. Or he is said to have slain her for good, having knocked her unconscious by throwing trees and boulders at her, and afterwards drowning her in the Shkumbin River, according to the localized lore of central Albania.

=== Notable drangue's ===
In Albanian beliefs each region is said to have its own drangue's. From Gjakova comes Ton Golia, from Peja, Rrustem Uka and Xhem Sadria, from Mirdita come Bibë Llesh Markola and Gjin Pjetri, from the Hoti come Gjeto Marku, Llesh Nikollë Luli, Marash Vata and Dodë Preçi. From the tribes of Merturi comes Prel Tuli, while from the Shala region come Mehmet Shpendi, Mar Lula, Gjeto Gega, Gjelosh Kola, Tol Cani, Let Patani and Vocërr Bala.

The leader of the drangue's is Lleshi i Zi or Llesh Gjoni, who comes from Mirdita. He is said to have played a crucial role in the wars of control for Mirdita which lead to his tribe, the Gjomarkaj's rising to power in the region. He would be the leader of the drangue's in the battle against the Kulshedra where he would deliver the "final-blow".

== Cult, practices and folk beliefs ==
Drangue is the most widespread culture hero among Albanians. The belief that a dragùa can be born every day has persisted among Albanian mountain folk until recently, and there are still elderly people alive who espouse the belief.

In Malësia, a region in northern Albania and southern Montenegro inhabited mostly by Albanians, the locals believe that the drangues exist and live among them.

Also seen as a lightning deity, the Drangue appears to be an Albanian equivalent of the Indo-European sky deity, holding the position of a chief god, expressly held by Zojz in Albanian pagan mythology.

=== Lightning and thunder-stones ===
Early evidence of the celestial cult in Illyria is provided by 6th century BCE Illyrian plaques from Lake Shkodra. Each of those plaques portray simultaneously sacred representations of the sky and the sun, and symbolism of lightning and fire, as well as the sacred tree and birds (eagles). In those plaques there is a mythological representation of the celestial deity: the Sun deity animated with a face and two wings, throwing lightning into a fire altar (the main thunderbolt that reaches the fire altar is also represented as a polearm at the extremity), which in some plaques is held by two men (sometimes on two boats).

The Illyrian plaques represent a practice that links the lightning and the hearth fire, which is similar to the Albanian ritual traditionally performed during big storms with torrential rains, lightning and hail, which often cause great damage to agriculture, livestock, and to the rural economy in general. The practice consists in bringing outdoors a fire container (Albanian: vatër me zjarr) and fire-related metallic objects seeking assistance from the supernatural power of the Fire, in order to turn the storm away and to avert the harms it can cause to the community.

The Albanian practice has been interpreted either as a form of prayer to appease the weather god in order to turn the storm away, or an act to give strength to the divine hero drangue for his struggle against the kulshedra, the demon of darkness and evil that causes the storms. Indeed, Albanian folk beliefs regard the lightning as Zjarri i Qiellit ("the Fire of the Sky") and consider it as the "weapon of the deity" (arma/shtiza/pushka e zotit). An Albanian word to refer to the lightning is rrufeja, related to rhomphaia, an ancient polearm.

Albanians traditionally believed in the supreme powers of thunder-stones (kokrra e rrufesë or guri i rejës), which were believed to be formed during lightning strikes and to be fallen from the sky. Thunder-stones were preserved in family life as important cult objects. It was believed that bringing them inside the house could bring good fortune, prosperity and progress in people, in livestock and in agriculture, or that rifle bullets would not hit the owners of the thunder-stones. A common practice was to hang a thunder-stone pendant on the body of the cattle or on the pregnant woman for good luck and to contrast the evil eye.

In Albanian culture, the heaviest type of oath swearing (Alb. beja më e rëndë) is taken by a thunder-stone "which comes from the sky" (beja me gur/kokërr reje/rrufeje që vjen nga perëndia). It was a very serious oath and people were afraid of it even though they were telling the truth. The act of absolving himself of any allegation of theft was performed in the following way: the thunder-stone was taken in the left hand and was touched by the right hand saying:

Për këtë kokërr rejet, nuk ta kam vjedhë as unë, as kush i shpisë sime e nuk e di se kush ta ka vjedhë! Në të rrejsha, reja më gjoftë!

Translation:

I swear by this thunder-stone that I have not stolen it, nor anyone of my house and I don't know who stole it! If I lied to you, may cloud strike me!

== In the Highland Lute ==
In the Lahuta e Malcís (English: Highland Lute)—one of the most important heroic epics of Albania—the drangues are presented as the personification of the Albanian Highlands heroes, and are the central figures of the 16th and 17th cantos. In the 16th canto a kulshedra escapes from a cave in Shalë to take revenge on Vocerr Bala, a drangue. A force of drangues gather and defeat the kulshedra. After the battle they are invited by oras, female protective spirits, to celebrate their victory.

In the 17th canto the central figures are two drangues named Rrustem Uka and Xhem Sadrija. After preparing for a wedding ceremony, they travel to Qafë Hardhi (English: Grapevine Pass) to rest. While cleaning their weapons and smoking, they discover that eight Montenegrin battalions, consisting of three hundred soldiers led by Mark Milani, are marching against Plava and Gucia. The two drangues, with the help of local shepherds, defend Qafë Hardhi and force the Montenegrins to retreat at Sutjeska.

== Drangue and Drangue-like figures ==
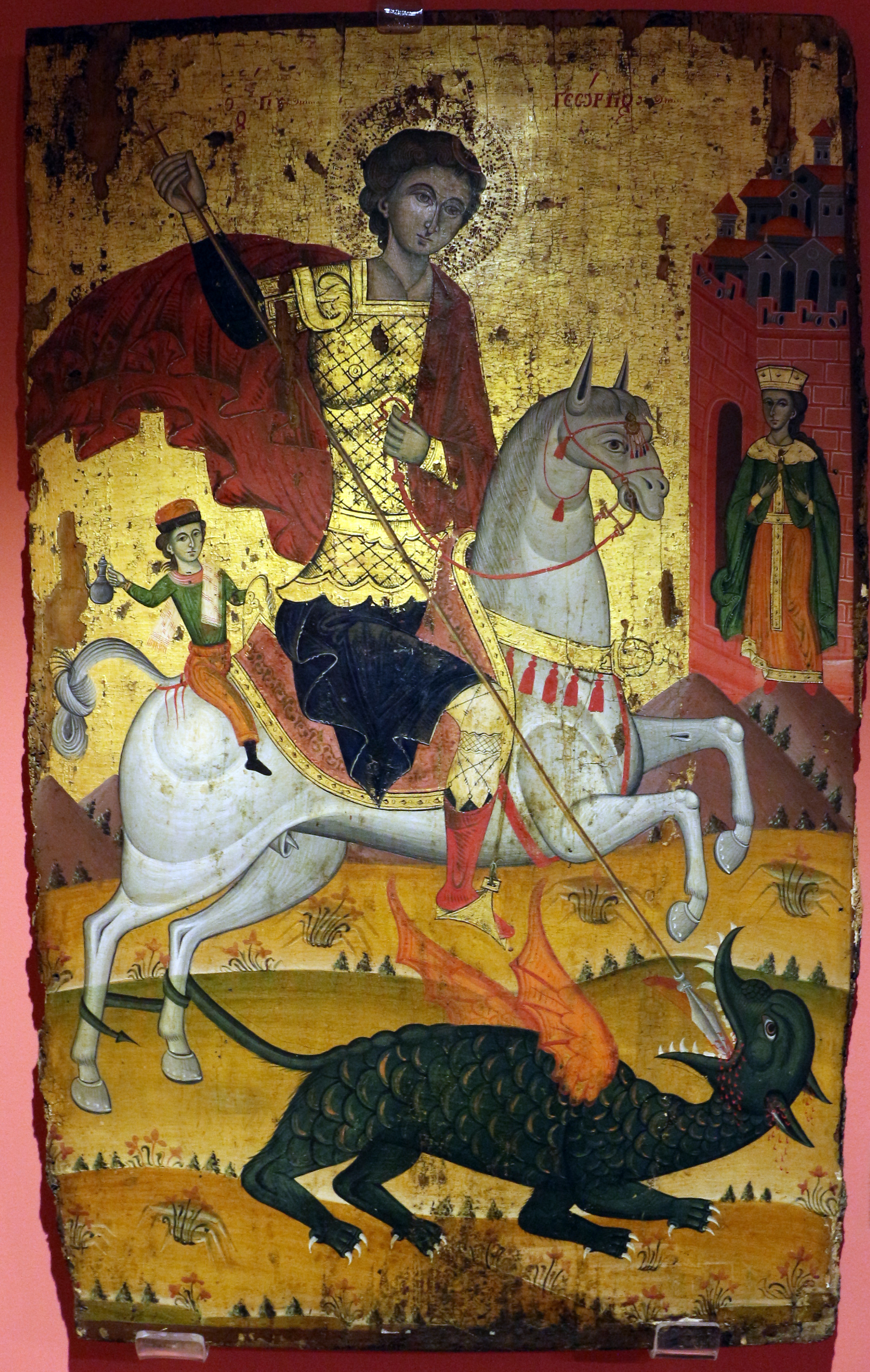
18th century icon of Saint George and the Dragon by Çetiri brothers, from Ardenica Monastery, now in the National Museum of Medieval Art in Tirana.

In some Albanian traditions, Shën Delli (meaning "Holy Sun") and Shën Ilias (from Greek Ἠλίας, Elias, "Elijah", through Ἥλιος, Helios, "Sun")) are names of drangue, often fighting kulshedras and protecting against storms and fire as a weather god. According to common Albanian folk beliefs, the Sun (Dielli) makes the sky cloudy or clears it up, and it is invoked in rainmaking rituals during times of drought. In the Albanian folk tale The Twins, the kulshedra – who blocks waters causing draught – is defeated by Zjerrmi/Zjerma (a name that literally means "the Fire") who is born "with the Sun on his forehead". In some variants Zjermi/Zjerma rescues a drangue called Zef, and together they defeat the kulshedra. Another renowned mythical character and divine hero who defeats the kulshedra is E Bija e Hënës dhe e Diellit ("the Daughter of the Moon and the Sun"), who is referred to as pika e qiellit ("drop of the sky" or "lightning").

In Albanian folklore also Shën Gjergji (identified with Saint George) have stories in which he fights (and defeats) a Bolla/Kulshedra.

== See also ==
- Albanian mythology
- Zana e Malit
- Shurdh
- Verbt
- Perëndi
- Zojz (deity)

== Sources ==
=== Bibliography ===
- Brahaj, Jaho (2007). Flamuri i Kombit Shqiptar: origjina, lashtësia. Enti Botues "Gjergj Fishta". ISBN 978-99943-38-84-9.
- Çabej, Eqrem (1987). Studime etimologjike ne fushë të shqipes - Etudes d'étymologie albanaise. Vol. 3 (C-D).
- Doja, Albert [in Albanian] (2005), "Mythology and Destiny" (PDF), Anthropos, 100 (2): 449–462, doi:10.5771/0257-9774-2005-2-449, JSTOR 40466549
- Durham, M. Edith (1910), "High Albania and its Customs in 1908", The Journal of the Royal Anthropological Institute of Great Britain and Ireland, 40: 453–472, doi:10.2307/2843266, hdl:2027/uc2.ark:/13960/t2697dj8z, JSTOR 2843266
- Elsie, Robert (1994). Albanian Folktales and Legends. Naim Frashëri Publishing Company. Archived from the original (pdf) on 2009-07-28.
- Elsie, Robert (2000). The Christian Saints of Albania. Vol. 13. Balkanistica.
- Elsie, Robert (2001a). A Dictionary of Albanian Religion, Mythology and Folk Culture. London: Hurst & Company. ISBN 1-85065-570-7.
- Elsie, Robert (2001b). Albanian Folktales and Legends. Dukagjini Publishing House.
- Fishta, Gjergj; Elsie, Robert; Mathie-Heck, Janice (2005). The highland lute: (Lahuta e malcís): the Albanian national epic. Centre for Albanian Studies (London). I.B.Tauris. ISBN 1-84511-118-4.
- Gjoni, Irena (2012). Marrëdhënie të miteve dhe kulteve të bregdetit të Jonit me areale të tjera mitike (PhD) (in Albanian). Tirana: University of Tirana, Faculty of History and Philology.
- Hyllested, Adam; Joseph, Brian D. (2022). "Albanian". In Olander, Thomas (ed.). The Indo-European Language Family: A Phylogenetic Perspective. Cambridge University Press. pp. 223–245. doi:10.1017/9781108758666. ISBN 978-1-108-75866-6. S2CID 161016819.
- Lambertz, Maximilian (1922). Albanische Märchen und andere Texte zur albanischen Volkskunde. Wien: Alfred Hölder. hdl:2027/inu.30000115238242.
- Lelaj, Olsi (2015). "Mbi tatuazhin në shoqërinë shqiptare" [On Tattoo in the Albanian Society]. Kultura Popullore. 34 (71–72). Centre of Albanological Studies: 91–118. ISSN 2309-5717.
- Lowie, Robert H. (2007). An Introduction to Cultural Anthropology. Read Books. ISBN 978-1-4067-1765-5.
- Nopcsa, Franzs (1923). Albanien. Religiöse Anschauungen, Sitten und Gebräuche.
- Pipa, Arshi (1993). "The Mythology of Albania". In Bonnefoy, Yves (ed.). American, African, and Old European mythologies. University of Chicago Press. ISBN 0-226-06457-3.
- Poghirc, Cicerone (1987). "Albanian Religion". In Mircea Eliade (ed.). The Encyclopedia of Religion. Vol. 1. New York: MacMillan Publishing Co. pp. 178–180.
- Röhrich, Lutz (1964). Märchen und Wirklichkeit: eine volkskundliche Untersuchung (in German). F. Steiner. ISBN 3-89676-380-6.
- Röhrich, Lutz (1991), Folktales and Reality, Indiana University Press, ISBN 0-253-35028-X
- Roques, Mario (1932). Le dictionnaire albanais.
- Schirò, Giuseppe (1923). Canti tradizionali ed altri saggi delle colonie albanesi di Sicilia [Traditional Songs and other Essays from the Albanian Colonies of Sicily] (in Albanian and Italian). Stab. tip. L. Pierro.
- Shkurti, Spiro (1989). Légendes et rites païens concernant la charrue (in French).
- Shuteriqi, Dhimitër S. (1959). Historia e letërsisë shqipe. Vol. 1. Universiteti Shtetëror i Tiranës, Instituti i Historisë dhe Gjuhësisë.
- Søborg, Tobias Mosbæk (2020). Sigmatic Verbal Formations in Anatolian and Indo-European: A Cladistic Study (Thesis). University of Copenhagen, Department of Nordic Studies and Linguistics.
- Tirta, Mark (2004). Petrit Bezhani (ed.). Mitologjia ndër shqiptarë (in Albanian). Tirana: Mësonjëtorja. ISBN 99927-938-9-9.
- Treimer, Karl (1971). "Zur Rückerschliessung der illyrischen Götterwelt und ihre Bedeutung für die südslawische Philologie". In Henrik Barić (ed.). Arhiv za Arbanasku starinu, jezik i etnologiju. Vol. I. R. Trofenik. pp. 27–33.
- Watkins, Calvert (1995). How to Kill a Dragon: Aspects of Indo-European Poetics. London: Oxford University Press. ISBN 978-0-19-514413-0.
- West, Morris L. (2007). Indo-European Poetry and Myth. Oxford University Press. ISBN 978-0-19-928075-9.
- Wheeler, G. Post (1936). Albanian Wonder Tales. New York: The Junior Literary Guild and Doubleday, Doran and Company, Inc. pp. 247–280.
- Çobani, Tonin (2017). Mitologji Shqiptare (Albanian mythology). Albas. ISBN 978-9928-02-982-9.
