= Little Constantine =

Legendary figure of Albanian folk poetry

Little Constantine (Albanian: Konstandini i vogël) is a legendary figure of Albanian folk poetry. In northern Albania he is also known as Aga Ymeri, in southern Albania as Ymer Ago, among the Arbëreshë as Konstandini i Vogëlith (Little Constantine), and in Byzantine acritic songs as Κωσταντίνος ό μικρός, Konstantinos o Mikros (Little Constantine). This character reflects the theme of the reunification of husband and wife in Albanian folklore, as did Odysseus in ancient Greek mythology.

== Background ==
The day after Aga Ymeri was married, he received the following order from the Sultan: "Aga Ymeri of Ulqin, you must depart immediately for war. The enemy has invaded..." Although this was unfortunate news, the warrior had to leave his wife and obey.

== Konstantini i vogelith ==
Arbëreshë version

(Old Albanian, 14th-15th century)

Kostandinhi i vogelthi,

Kle tri dit cie dhender klè. Kleu i thritum ga mregi i Naplës Pse e klej per shok te pare I tergoj te parne karte, edhe e shtuvi nen galjofe ei tergoj te ditne karte, edhe e shtuvi nen galjofe. I tergoj te tritene, edhe jo nuk munt i thojt!

Nende vitre e nende dite, kej e bukura te preste. Posa shkuan nendë vitra, Nente vitre e nende dite, Mâ ksulje e skamantilje, Ven e zun nhije talantushe, nhije lepush ne kragh i ljidhne, dhe i shkruajtin Kostandinhiet; "Shkuan vitrezat dhe ditet, vete e bukura ne klishe";

Kostandinhi kalin nghete, Ate kal te brímurith shpeite ndar ne der e klishes te ku ghiurmeza dhe isht. Kalin lidh e breda ghine shoch te bukuran ne ljot. "O ju krushkhj dhe ju buljare Isht kij trimi k'rori i par!" Kostandinhi nuse muar, E gka dera e madhe duav.

Albanian translation
Konstantini i vogëli,

Kish tre ditë që dhëndër qe. Qe i thirrur nga mbreti i Napolit Se e kishte shok te parë I dërgoi të parën letër, dhe e shtiu në xhep I dërgoi të dytën letër Dhe e shtiu ne xhep. I dërgoi të tretën (letër), Dhe këtë herë jo nuk mundi ti thot!

Nëntë vjet dhe nëntë ditë, Pat e bukura të priste. Porsa shkuan nëntë vite, Nëntë vite e nëntë ditë, Me kësula e shalle, Shkuan dhe zunë një dallëndyshe, një fjollë ne krah i lidhën, Dhe i shkruajtën Konstantinit; "(Të) Shkuan vitet e ditët, Vie e bukura (me ne) në kishë"; (d.m.th të martohet)

Kostantini kalin hipë, Atë kal te shpejtë (brímurith=brimthi) shpejtë të vie tek dera e kishës deri ku gjurmët vetëm dalloheshin. Kalin (e) lidh dhe brënda hyri (E) Shef të bukurën me lot. "O ju krushq e ju fisnikë Ky trimi ka qenë kurora e parë!" Kostantini nusen e morri, Dhe nga dera e madhe doli.

English translation
Constantine the Younger

he was a groom for only three days before the king of Naples called him because he was his first friend He sent him a letter but be put it in his away in his pocket He sent him a second letter but he put it away in his pocket The third time he sent him a letter He couldn't say no

Nine years and nine days his beauty had to wait As nine years passed nine years and nine days With hats and scarves they caught a swallow a ribbon was tied on her shoulder and they sent a letter to Constantine "Years and days passed the beauty will now go to church"

Constantine mounted his horse a fast horse And rushes to the door of the church where the footprints are still visible He ties his horse and he went inside to find his Beauty in tears "Oh you attendants and nobles this gallant was her first crown!" Constantine then took his bride and he got out the large door.

== See also ==
- The Twins (Albanian tale)

== Sources ==
=== Bibliography ===
- Elsie, Robert (2001a). Albanian Folktales and Legends (2nd ed.). Dukagjini Publishing House.
- Elsie, Robert (2001b). A Dictionary of Albanian Religion, Mythology and Folk Culture. London: Hurst & Company. ISBN 1-85065-570-7.
- Elsie, Robert. "Aga Ymeri of Ulqin". Robert Elsie:Albanian Literature. Archived from the original on 28 September 2017.
