= Herensuge =

Dragon in Basque Mythology

Herensuge is the name for a mythical dragon in the Basque language. In Basque mythology, dragons appear sparingly, sometimes with seven heads. Herensuge often also appear in the form of a serpent. The seven heads were believed to be the offspring of the Herensuge dragon. When the little dragons were fully grown, they would fall off their mother's head. Only the god Sugaar is associated with this creature but more often with a serpent.

A legend describes a Navarrese knight, Teodosio de Goñi, who while making penance for double parricide in the Aralar Range rescues a woman that had been given as ransom to the dragon. When the chains that tie his ankles are bitten by the dragon and he sees no way of defeating it, the knight prays to Saint Michael to save him. In Heaven, the archangel is notified, but refuses to enter the fight without God. The archangel arrives with God over his head and decapitates the dragon, liberating Teodosio from his chains and ending his penance.

This legend is associated to the monastery of San Miguel de Aralar. It has been interpreted as a way of justifying the break from the religion and customs of pagan Basques and the adoption of Christianity and, specifically, the veneration for St. Michael. Otherwise, it is very similar to other European legends of knights and dragons, which likely had a significant influence on it.

== Legends of Herensuge ==
- The Grateful Tartalo and the Herensuge: A prince frees a Tartalo, a Basque one-eyed giant, from his father the king. He flees from his father's anger and calls upon the Tartalo for help. The Tartalo tells him to become a gardener for another king. While there, the prince wins the heart of the youngest daughter of the king who is due to be sacrificed to a seven-headed Herensuge. With the help of the Tartalo, the disguised prince, is able to kill the creature after three battles. The king promises his daughter to the man who defeated the Herensuge. The end, the prince's identity is revealed, and he marries the princess.
- The Seven-Headed Serpent: A young man meets an old woman who asks for a piece of the cake he carries. He offers the entire cake, and in return for his kindness she gives him a stick that can kill with a single blow. He becomes a shepherd for a palace and uses the stick to protect the flock. After he defeats a number of beasts, one tells him of a palace in the woods where he will find wealth in exchange for sparing its life. The boy goes to the palace where he finds great wealth. He travels throughout the country until he finds a land where people must draw lots to see who will be sacrificed to a local Herensuge. The king has lost and must sacrifice his daughter. The man accompanies the daughter to the mountain of the Herensuge and kills all of its seven heads with the stick. The man is married to the princess as a reward for saving her.
- The Serpent in the Wood: A young woman wishes to go see the country and sets out to meet new people. She journeys until she enters a wood where she is captured by a Herensuge. After three years of imprisonment, she wishes to return home. The serpent tells her to leave and come back in two days, and that he is actually a prince punished to be a Herensuge for four years and that, since his punishment is almost over, he will marry her. He gives her a distaff and spindle and a silk handkerchief before she leaves. When she arrives home, her father does not let her leave again, and she is only able to escape after four days. By this time the prince is gone and she makes the very long journey to the prince's city. When she arrives the prince is being married to another woman. The girl shows the items given to her, causing the prince to disavow his new marriage and instead marry her as he promised.
