= Hëna (Albanian paganism) =

The Moon in Albanian paganism

Hëna (Albanian indefinite form Hënë; Gheg: Hana, indef. Hanë), the Moon, holds a prominent position in Albanian pagan customs, beliefs, rituals, myths, and legends. In Albanian traditions the Moon's cyclical phases have regulated many aspects of life, defining agricultural and livestock activities, various crafts, and human body.

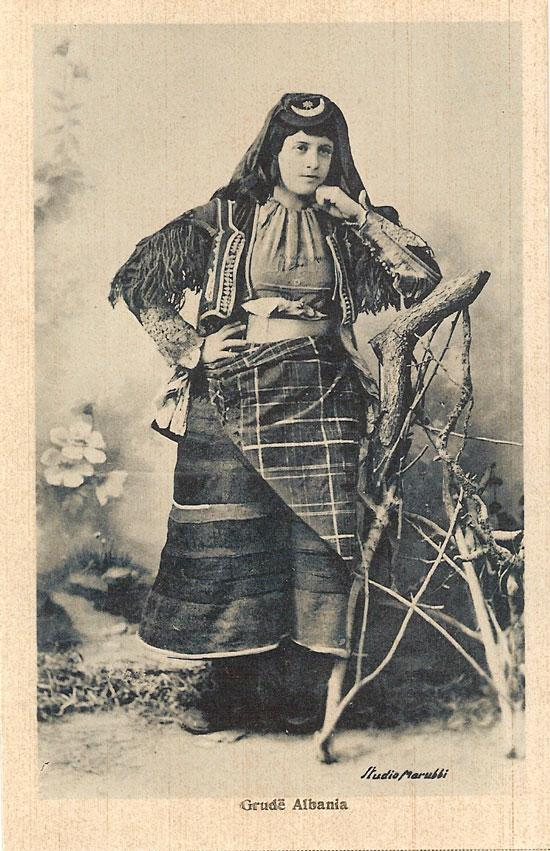
The sun/star and the crescent moon stitched to the crown of the headgear of a woman of the Gruda tribe. This fashion was very common among Catholic women of all the northern Albanian tribes.

Albanians were firstly described in written sources as worshippers of the Sun and the Moon by German humanist Sebastian Franck in 1534, but the Sun and the Moon have been preserved as sacred elements of Albanian tradition since antiquity. The symbolization of the crescent Moon, often combined with the Sun, is commonly found in a variety of contexts of Albanian folk art, including traditional tattooing, grave art, jewellery, embroidery, and house carvings.

In Albanian pagan beliefs and mythology the Moon is animistically personified as a female deity. The Sun (Dielli) is her male counterpart. In some folk tales, myths and legends the Moon and the Sun are regarded as wife and husband, also notably appearing as the parents of E Bija e Hënës dhe e Diellit ("the Daughter of the Moon and the Sun"); in others the Sun and the Moon are regarded as brother and sister, but in this case they are never considered consorts. In Old Albanian the name Hana/Hanë was attested also as a theonym – the Albanian rendering of Roman goddess Diana.

Albanian beliefs, myths and legends are organized around the dualistic struggle between good and evil, light and darkness, which cyclically produces the cosmic renewal. The most famous representation of it is the constant battle between drangue and kulshedra, which is seen as a mythological extension of the cult of the Sun and the Moon. In Albanian traditions, kulshedra is also fought by the Daughter of the Moon and the Sun, who uses her light power against pride and evil, or by other heroic characters marked in their bodies by the symbols of celestial objects, including in particular the Moon. Among Albanians the dualism between black/darkness and white/light is also remarkably represented by the Moon's phases, which symbolize both fertility (increase) and sterility (decrease).

== Name ==
The Albanian word hënë (definite form: hëna; Gheg: hanë, def. hana) is generally considered to be from the Late Indo-European *skond-nah₂ "the shiny one".

As an Albanian theonym, Hana/Hanë is recorded as early as 1685, in the Cuneus Prophetarum ("The Band of the Prophets") by the Old Albanian writer Pjetër Bogdani, as the Albanian rendering of Roman goddess Diana.

Monday is named e hënë in Albanian, translating the Latin diēs Lūnae with the native name of the Moon.

== History ==
Human's imagination has always been stimulated by the light of the Moon that pushes away the darkness of the night, as well as by the Moon's occult influence on the movement of the waters and on the life of plants and animals, giving rise to countless and suggestive myths, symbols, and legends across different cultures. Since ancient times the personified Moon has expressed maternity, and the celestial body has carried all these motifs in astrological symbolism.

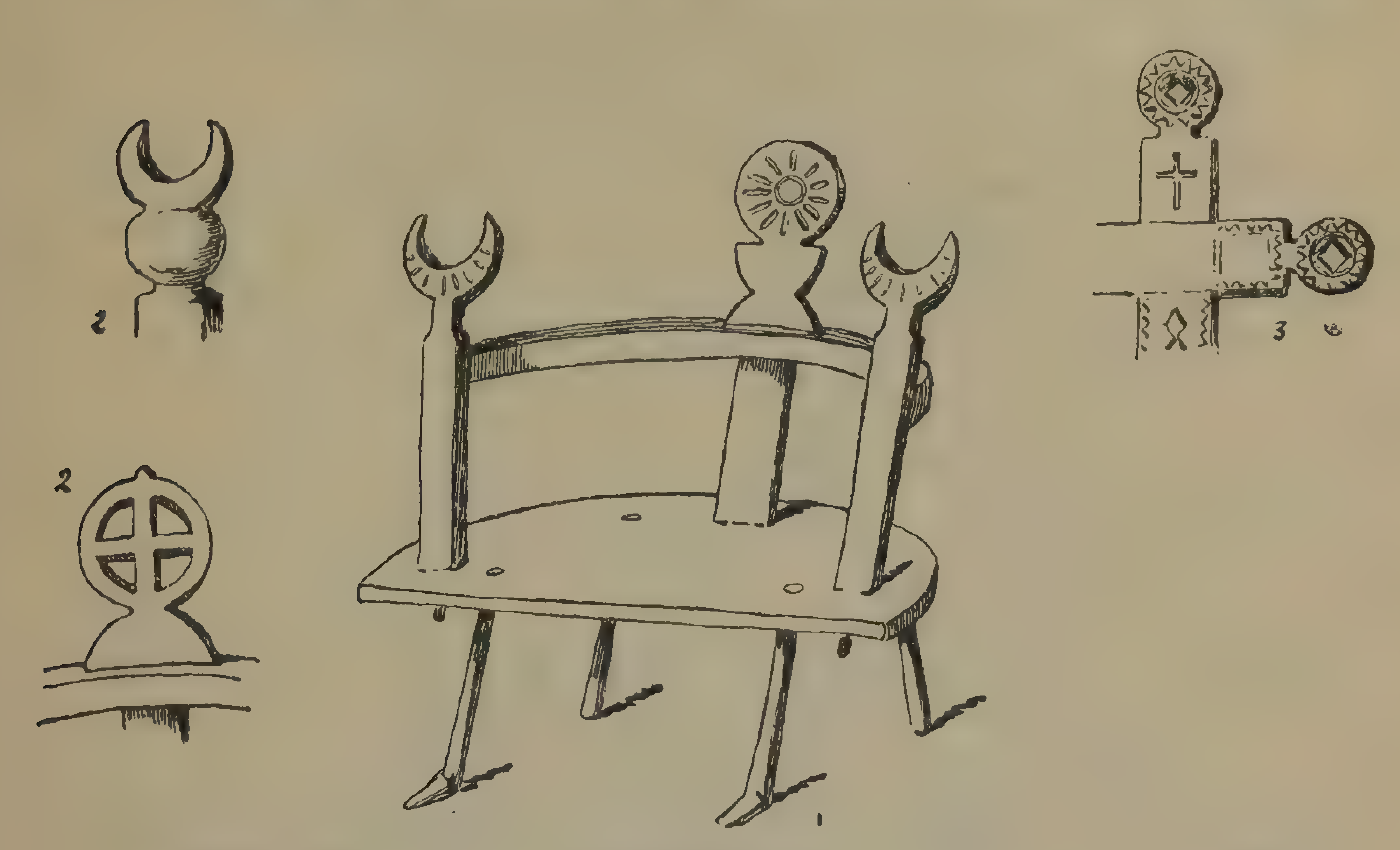
Albanian traditional carving patterns on chairs and graves, drawn by Edith Durham before 1928. They are representations of the Sun (Dielli) and the Moon (Hëna), sometimes also rayed (symbolizing their light).

Prehistoric Illyrian symbols used on funeral monuments of the pre-Roman period have been used also in Roman times and continued into late antiquity in the broad Illyrian territory. The same motifs were kept with identical cultural-religious symbolism on various monuments of the early medieval culture of the Albanians. They appear also on later funerary monuments, including the medieval tombstones (stećci) in Bosnia and Herzegovina and the burial monuments used until recently in northern Albania, Kosovo, Montenegro, southern Serbia and northern North Macedonia. Such motifs are particularly related to the ancient cults of the Sun and Moon, survived until recently among northern Albanians.

The widespread deification of the Moon among Albanians is considered to have been related to the ancient worship of a local deity associated with agriculture and nature. Hana/Hanë as a theonym is recorded by Bogdani as the Albanian rendering of Roman Diana. Of the Albanian mythological figures, Zana – usually associated with mountains, springs and streams, forests, vegetation and animals, human vital energy and sometimes destiny – is thought to have been originally a pre-Roman deity, and an Illyrian goddess equivalent of the Ancient Greek Artemis and Roman Diana. As such she would have been the personification of the Moon and the lady of the forests, protector of animals, guardian of springs and streams, protector of women, as well as distributor of sovereignty. Many statues and other items associated to this goddess have been found in the Shkodra region in northern Albania, maybe more than of any other goddess of the Illyrian pantheon. There is also an exceptional frequency of ancient inscriptions of the Roman era dedicated to the cult of Diana in Albania and the rest of the Balkans, which gives reason to think of an interpretatio romana of an indigenous pre-Roman goddess. Innumerable Albanian folk poems, myths and legends that are dedicated to Zana and her friends have been handed down to modern times.

== Cult, practices, beliefs, and mythology ==
=== Symbolism ===
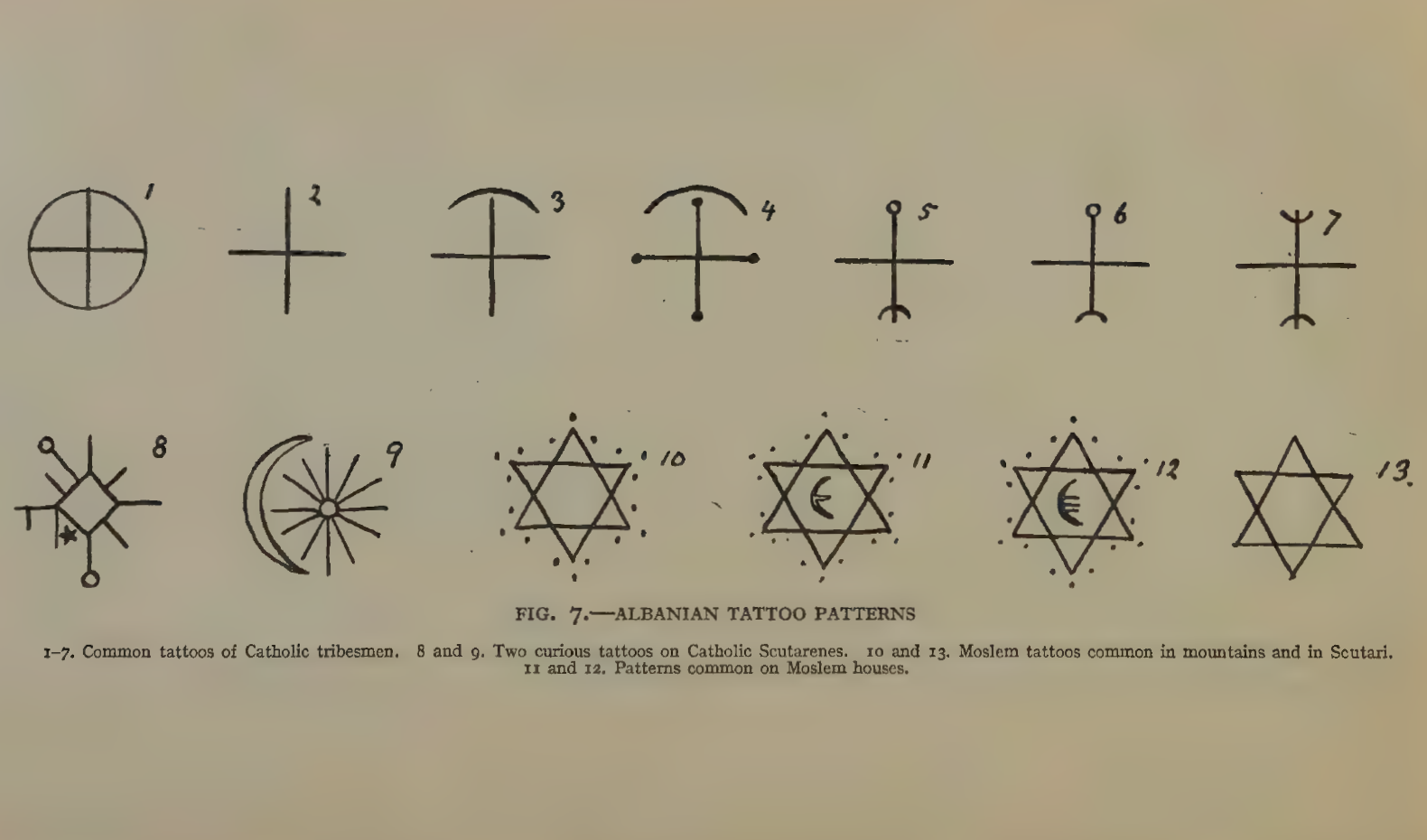
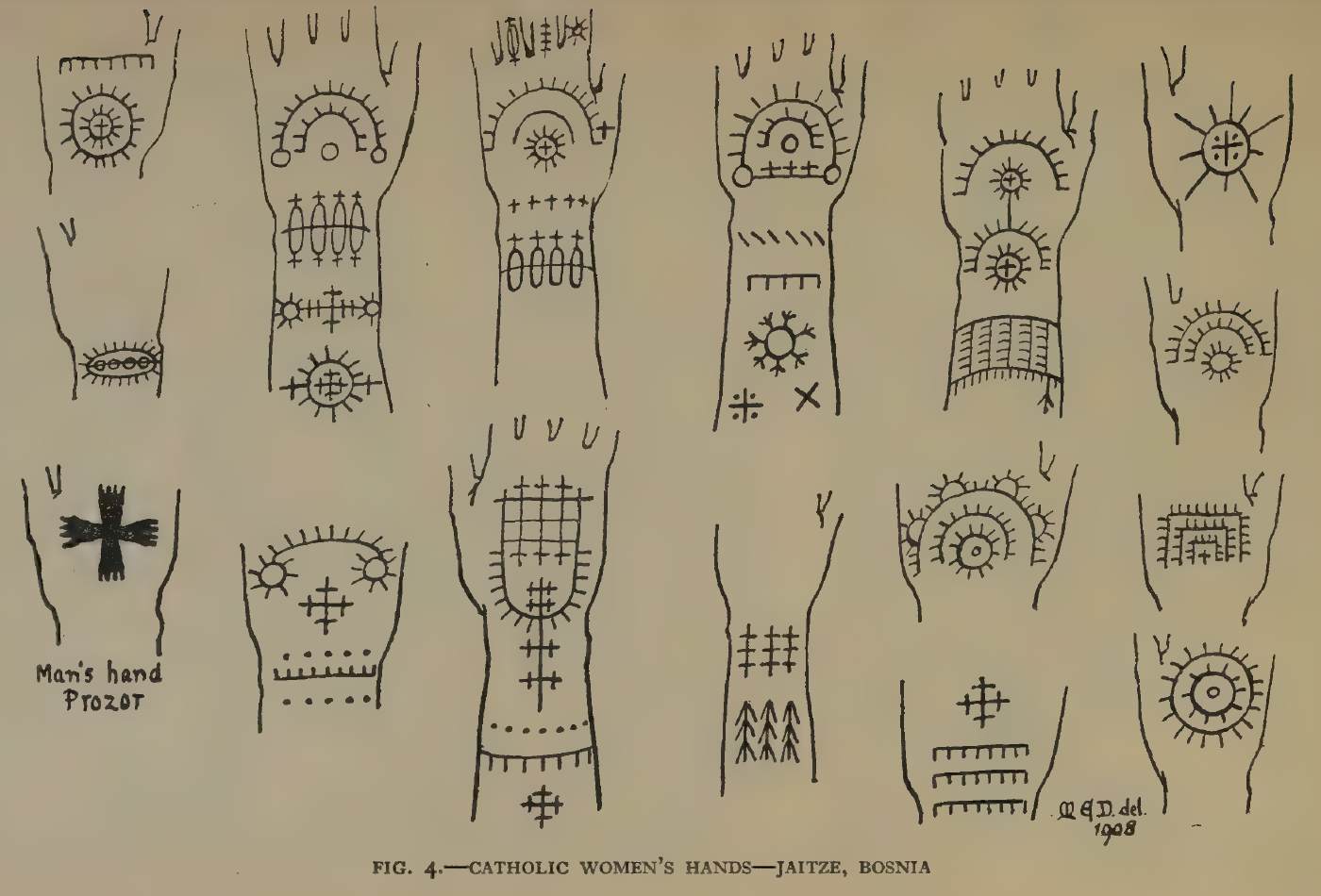
Tattoo patterns of northern Albanians (top); tattoo patterns of Catholic women (and one man) in Bosnia (bottom). Drawn by Edith Durham in the early 20th century. Many of those patterns also appear on Albanian traditional art (graves, jewellery, embroidery, and house carvings). They are symbols of celestial, light, fire and hearth worship, expressing the favor of the light within the dualistic struggle between light and darkness.

The cult of the Moon is commonly found in a variety of contexts of Albanian folk art, including traditional tattooing, grave art, jewellery, embroidery, and house carvings.

Edith Durham, who extensively studied Balkan traditional tattooing with fieldwork research, was able to thoroughly explain the patterns of traditional tattoos only after asking to Albanians of Thethi–Shala for a description of all the little lines (or twigs) that accompanied a semicircle incised on an old gravestone. They answered that those twigs were "the light coming from the Moon, of course". For Albanians, the twigs or little lines were the traditional way to represent light, emanated from the Sun (Dielli) and from the Moon (Hëna), which was often represented as a crescent. So, the patterns of Catholic tattoos in Bosnia, which until then were known as "circles, semicircles, and lines or twigs", eventually were clearly explained as compounds of rayed (emanating light) suns, moons, and crosses, from an expression of Nature-worship and hearth-worship. Furthermore, the crosses (including swastikas) have been explained by Indo-Europeanist Karl Treimer as the symbol of the fire god, Enji.

=== Phraseology ===
The rich corpus of Albanian phraseology that features the Moon shows that the Moon had a significant role in the culture, customs, beliefs and rites once practiced in the ancient times by the Albanians. It also has retained the essence of the original Indo-European beliefs of the Moon and that of the Moon's impact on humans, which managed to survive in the Albanian traditional society thanks to its relative isolation, alongside the peculiar ethno-genetic and cultural traits of the Albanian people.

=== Lunar phases ===
In Albanian traditions the different phases of the moon have determined influences on agricultural and livestock activities and on those related to various crafts, but also on several human aspects.

Some instances of Albanian beliefs related to the Moon phases are:

agriculture

- the crops should be sown during the phase of waning moon, otherwise the growth would affect only the stalks and leaves at the expense of seed production;
- harvesting should be carried out during the full moon;
- olives should not be planted during the dark of the moon;
- trees would bear fruit in the new moon;

human body

- human hair should be cut during the waning of the moon, cutting them during the new moon would turn them white;
- marriages should be celebrated during the full moon, in order to ensure offspring;
- children under the age of one should not look at the moon, otherwise they would suffer from diarrhoea;
- new clothes should be worn during the new moon;

new buildings

- the foundation of the new house should be started during the growing moon.

=== Dualistic worldview, cosmic renewal ===
Albanian beliefs, myths and legends are organized around the dualistic struggle between good and evil, light and darkness, which cyclically produces the cosmic renewal.

The most famous Albanian mythological representation of the dualistic struggle between good and evil, light and darkness, is the constant battle between drangue and kulshedra, a conflict that symbolises the cyclic return in the watery and chthonian world of death, accomplishing the cosmic renewal of rebirth. The legendary battle of a heroic deity associated with thunder and weather – like drangue – who fights and slays a huge multi-headed serpent associated with water, storms, and drought – like kulshedra – is a common motif of Indo-European mythology. The original legend may have symbolized the Chaoskampf, a clash between forces of order and chaos. In Albanian tradition the clash between drangue and kulshedra, light and darkness, is furthermore seen as a mythological representation of the cult of the Sun and the Moon, widely observed in Albanian traditional tattooing.

In Albanian mythology and folklore, the supremacy of the deity of the sky over that of the underworld is symbolized by the victory of celestial divine heroes against kulshedra (often described as an earthly/chthonic deity or demon). Those celestial divine heroes are often drangue (the most widespread culture hero among Albanians), but also E Bija e Hënës dhe e Diellit ("the Daughter of the Moon and the Sun") who is described as pika e qiellit ("drop of the sky" or "lightning") which falls everywhere from heaven on the mountains and the valleys and strikes pride and evil, or by other heroic characters marked in their bodies by the symbols of celestial objects, including in particular the Moon.

Among Albanians the dualism between black/darkness and white/light is also remarkably represented by the Moon's phases, which symbolize both fertility (increase) and sterility (decrease). This is reflected, for instance, in the traditional description as "black-faced" for a man who owes blood (see gjakmarrje).

== Bibliography ==
- Dobruna-Salihu, Exhlale (2005). "Cult symbols and images on funerary monuments of the Roman Period in the central section in Dardania". In M. Sanadaer, A. Rendić-Miočević (ed.). Religija i mit kao poticaj rimskoj provincijalnoj plastici. Akti VIII. međunarodnog kolokvija o problemima rimskog provincijalnog umjetničkog stvaralaštva / Religion and myth as an impetus for the Roman provincial sculpture. The Proceedings of the 8th International Colloquium on Problems of Roman Provincial Art. Golden marketing-Tehniéka knjiga. Odsjek za arheologiju Filozofskog fakulteta u Zagrebu. pp. 343–350. ISBN 953-212-242-7.
- Doja, Albert [in Albanian] (2005), "Mythology and Destiny" (PDF), Anthropos, 100 (2): 449–462, doi:10.5771/0257-9774-2005-2-449, JSTOR 40466549
- Durham, Edith (1928a). High Albania. LO Beacon Press. ISBN 978-0-8070-7035-2.
- Durham, Edith (1928b). Some tribal origins, laws and customs of the Balkans.
- Dushi, Arbnora (2020). "The Sister-Brother Recognition Motif in the Albanian Folk Ballad: Meaning and Contexts within the National Culture". Tautosakos Darbai. 59: 17–29. doi:10.51554/TD.2020.28363. S2CID 253540847.
- Egro, Dritan (2003). Islam in Albanian Lands During the First Two Centuries of the Ottoman Rule. Department of History of Bilkent University.
- Elsie, Robert (1994). Albanian Folktales and Legends. Naim Frashëri Publishing Company. Archived from the original (pdf) on 2009-07-28.
- Elsie, Robert (2001a). A Dictionary of Albanian Religion, Mythology and Folk Culture. London: Hurst & Company. ISBN 1-85065-570-7.
- Elsie, Robert (2001b). Albanian Folktales and Legends. Dukagjini Publishing House.
- Galaty, Michael; Lafe, Ols; Lee, Wayne; Tafilica, Zamir (2013). Light and Shadow: Isolation and Interaction in the Shala Valley of Northern Albania. The Cotsen Institute of Archaeology Press. ISBN 978-1-931745-71-0.
- Koch, Harold (2015). "Patterns in the diffusion of nomenclature systems: Australian subsections in comparison to European days of the week". In Dag T.T. Haug (ed.). Historical Linguistics 2013: Selected papers from the 21st International Conference on Historical Linguistics, Oslo, 5-9 August 2013. Current Issues in Linguistic Theory. Vol. 334. With the assistance of: Eiríkur Kristjánsson. John Benjamins Publishing Company. ISBN 978-90-272-6818-1.
- Lelaj, Olsi (2015). "Mbi tatuazhin në shoqërinë shqiptare" [On Tattoo in the Albanian Society]. Kultura Popullore. 34 (71–72). Centre of Albanological Studies: 91–118. ISSN 2309-5717.
- Mutavdžić, Predrag; Krijezi, Merima; Sivački, Ana (2020). "Mesec u frazeologizmima u savremenom albanskom, grčkom i srpskom jeziku" [The Lexeme Moon as a Key Constituent of Idiomatic Expressions in Modern Albanian, Greek and Serbian] (PDF). Филолошки преглед [Philological Review] (in Serbian and English). doi:10.18485/fpregled.2020.47.2.3.
- Neri, Sergio (2021). "hënë". DPEWA - Digitales Philologisch-Etymologisches Wörterbuch des Altalbanischen.
- Pipa, Arshi (1993). "The Mythology of Albania". In Bonnefoy, Yves (ed.). American, African, and Old European mythologies. University of Chicago Press. ISBN 0-226-06457-3.
- Poghirc, Cicerone (1987). "Albanian Religion". In Mircea Eliade (ed.). The Encyclopedia of Religion. Vol. 1. New York: MacMillan Publishing Co. pp. 178–180.
- Shuteriqi, Dhimitër S. (1959). Historia e letërsisë shqipe. Vol. 1. Universiteti Shtetëror i Tiranës, Instituti i Historisë dhe Gjuhësisë.
- Stipčević, Aleksandar (1974). The Illyrians: history and culture (1977 ed.). Noyes Press. ISBN 978-0-8155-5052-5.
- Tirta, Mark (2004). Petrit Bezhani (ed.). Mitologjia ndër shqiptarë (in Albanian). Tirana: Mësonjëtorja. ISBN 99927-938-9-9.
- Treimer, Karl (1971). "Zur Rückerschliessung der illyrischen Götterwelt und ihre Bedeutung für die südslawische Philologie". In Henrik Barić (ed.). Arhiv za Arbanasku starinu, jezik i etnologiju. Vol. I. R. Trofenik. pp. 27–33.
- Watkins, Calvert (1995). How to Kill a Dragon: Aspects of Indo-European Poetics. London: Oxford University Press. ISBN 978-0-19-514413-0.
- West, Morris L. (2007). Indo-European Poetry and Myth. Oxford University Press. ISBN 978-0-19-928075-9.
