= E Bija e Hënës dhe e Diellit =

Albanian mythological figure

E Bija e Hënës dhe e Diellit ("the Daughter of the Moon and the Sun") is a character in Albanian mythology and folklore, the daughter of Hëna ("the Moon") and Dielli ("the Sun"). She is described as pika e qiellit ("drop of the sky" or "lightning") which falls everywhere from heaven on the mountains and the valleys and strikes pride and evil. In the legends she helps a hero winning a fight against a kulshedra. Her victory over the kulshedra symbolizes the supremacy of the deity of the sky over that of the underworld in the dualistic struggle between light and darkness.

== Mythology ==
In Albanian folk beliefs the sun (Dielli) and the moon (Hëna) are personified deities. In folk tales, myths and legends the sun appears as a male figure, and the moon as a female figure. In some traditions the sun and the moon are regarded as husband and wife, and in other traditions as brother and sister. In the case of E Bija e Hënës dhe e Diellit the sun is her father and the moon is her mother.

E Bija e Hënës dhe e Diellit is described as pika e qiellit ("drop of the sky" or "lightning") which falls everywhere from heaven on the mountains and the valleys and strikes pride and evil. In the legends she helps a hero in his fight against a kulshedra, an earthly/chthonic deity or demon originating from darkness. In Albanian mythology the kulshedra is usually fought and defeated by the drangue, also seen as a sky and lightning deity or divine hero. The supremacy of E Bija e Hënës dhe e Diellit and of other similar celestial Albanian characters – such as Zjermi who is born with the Sun on his forehead – over the kulshedra, reflects the supremacy of the deity of the sky over that of the underworld in the dualistic struggle between light and darkness.

== In literature ==
The legend of E Bija e Hënës dhe e Diellit has also been narrated by the Albanian writer Mitrush Kuteli in the collection Tregime të moçme shqiptare ("Old Albanian tales"), published in 1965.
