= Stihi =

Mythological creature in Albanian mythology

Stihi is a fire-breathing storm demon in Albanian mythology and folklore, similar to the kulshedra.

== Etymology ==
The Albanian term stihí is a variant of stuhí, "storm", related to Greek: στοιχείο, "element, spirit".

== Appearance ==
A female demon in south Albanian and Italo-Albanian popular belief. Sometimes depicted as a fearsome fire-breathing dragon guarding a treasure, in other versions as a giant serpent guarding gold underground. Stihi can also appear in other forms, such as animals or ghostly figures, reflecting its nature as a guarding spirit derived from the souls of the dead. The Stihi figure originates within the pre-Christian pagan framework of Albanian folklore, where beliefs in nature spirits and elemental forces formed a core component of spiritual life. Albanian paganism, drawing from ancient Paleo-Balkanic substrates, emphasized the veneration of weather and storm entities as manifestations of divine or supernatural power, persisting through oral transmission despite later Christian influences. This context aligns with broader Indo-European patterns of storm deity worship evident in the region.

== See also ==
- Kulshedra
- Kukuth
- Perria

== Sources ==
=== Bibliography ===
- Elsie, Robert (2001). A dictionary of Albanian religion, mythology and folk culture. NYU Press. p. 236. ISBN 978-1-85065-570-1.
- Lurker, Manfred (2004). The Routledge dictionary of gods and goddesses, devils and demons. Routledge. ISBN 978-0-415-34018-2.
- Tirta, Mark (2004). Petrit Bezhani (ed.). Mitologjia ndër shqiptarë (in Albanian). Tirana: Mësonjëtorja. ISBN 99927-938-9-9.
