= Albanian traditional tattooing =

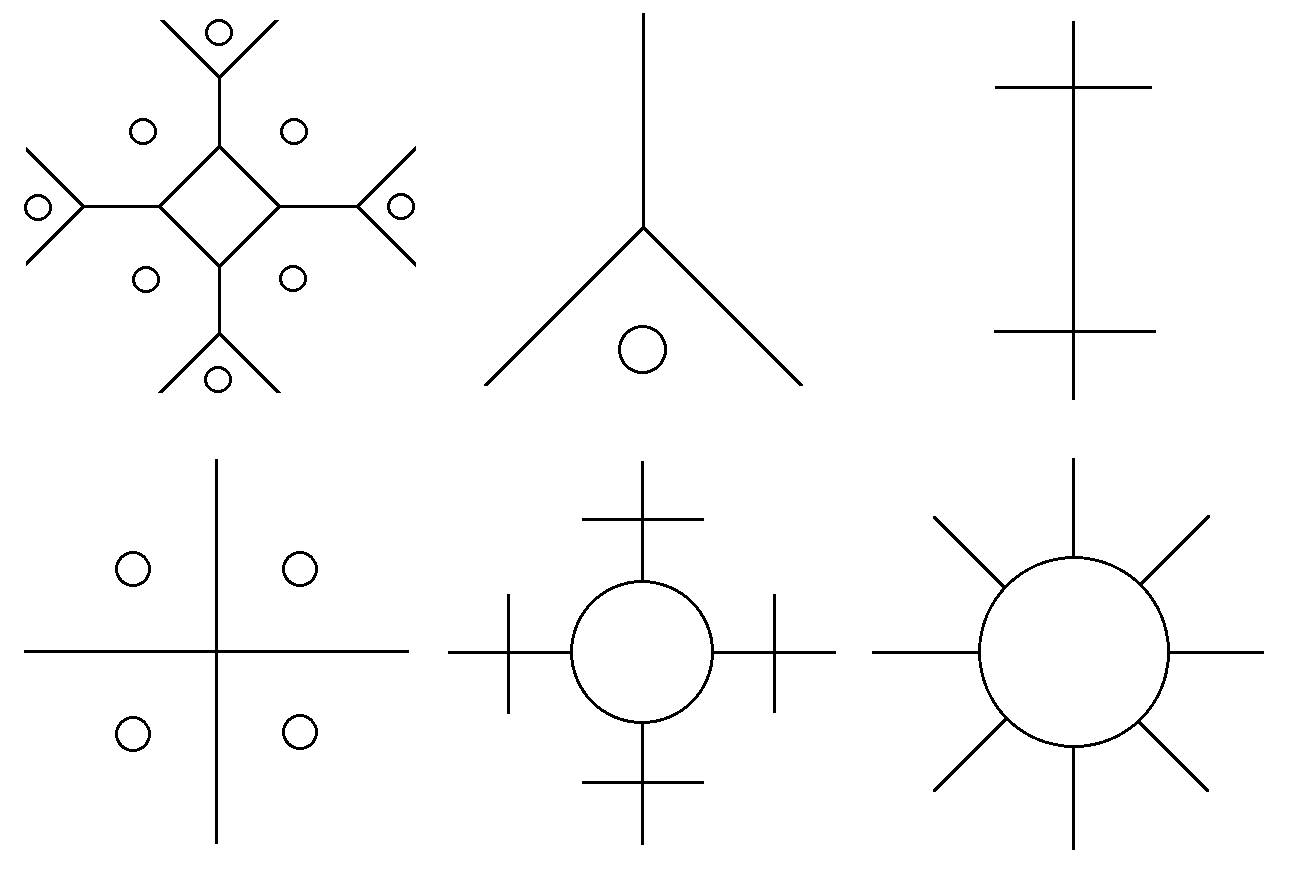
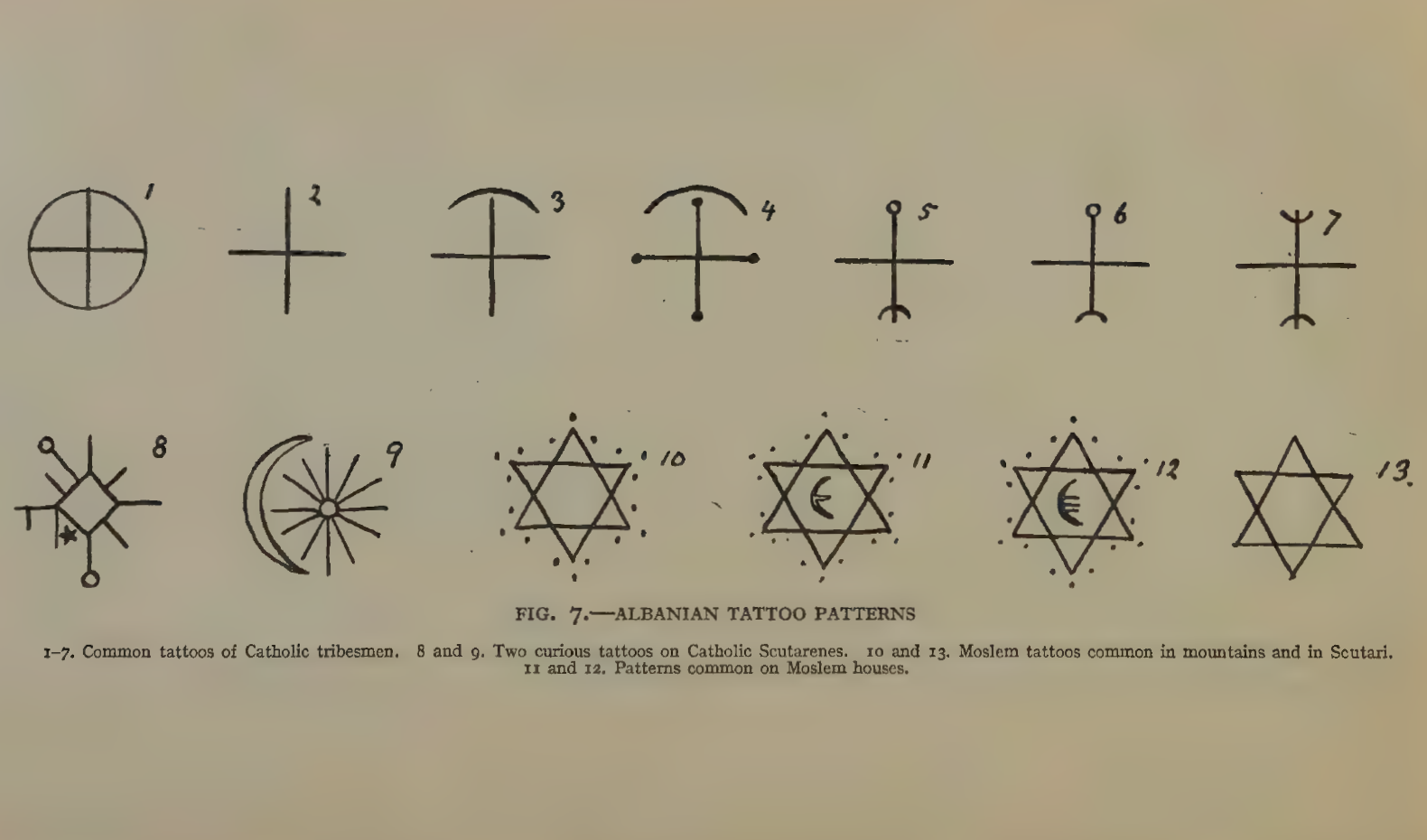
Albanian tattoo patterns: 19th century (top), early 20th century (bottom). They are symbols of the Sun (Dielli) and the Moon (Hëna); the cross (also swastika in some tattoos) is the Albanian traditional way to represent the deified Fire – Zjarri, evidently also called with the theonym Enji.

Tattooing among Albanians is a long-standing tradition that dates back to Illyrian times and has been maintained in the mountainous regions of the western Balkans.

== History ==
Based on ancient writers such as Herodotus (5th century BC), Cicero, and Strabo (1st century BC)—whose accounts are corroborated by archaeological findings—ethnographic studies have concluded that tattooing had been practiced among the peoples of the Balkan peninsula since antiquity. The practice was observed among Illyrian and Thracian tribes, who used tattooing to distinguish tribal affiliations.

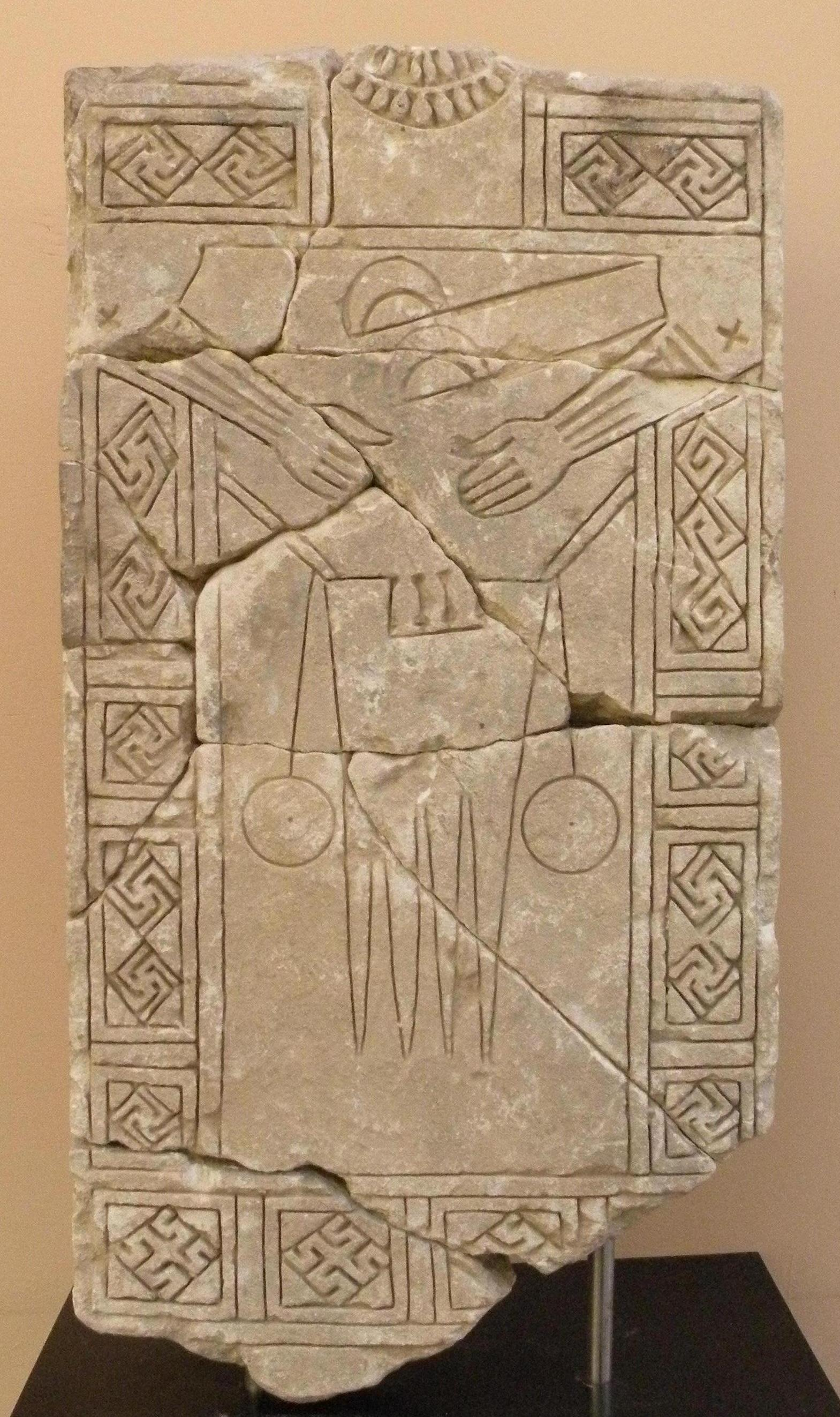
Early figurative representation of the Paleo-Balkan custom of tattooing on a 610–550 BC Daunian funerary stele from Apulia

Long bronze needles with wooden handles discovered in Glasinac and Donja Dolina have been identified as tattooing implements. Early figurative depictions of tattoos appear in Apulia, southeast Italy, within the material culture of the Daunians, who migrated from the western Balkans. Tattooing among the Daunians is attested on Daunian stelae and on matt-painted ollae. It is also visible on the wall of a late 4th-century tomb chamber in Arpi, where a painting depicts tattoos on the arms of a "priestess" riding a quadriga. Daunian material culture indicates that the forearms were the most frequently tattooed areas of the body.

While tattooing was often used in the Greco-Roman world as a punitive measure or mark of ownership, ancient Balkan peoples appear to have regarded it as a significant cultural marker. Ancient sources suggest that in the Balkans, tattooing was primarily practiced by elites and was particularly common among women.

The practice was most prevalent in preliterate tribal communities, where women played a central role in both administering the tattoos and wearing them. Markings may have symbolized sexual maturity, ancestry, tribal affiliation, or religious beliefs. In the western Balkans, tattooing persisted into the early 20th century in isolated areas of Albania and Bosnia, regions historically part of Illyria.

== Related practices ==
Traditional tattooing has also been practiced by Catholics in Bosnia and Herzegovina and Dalmatia, known as sicanje, and by women of some Vlach communities in the western Balkans.

== Documentation ==
=== 19th century ===
Albanian traditional tattooing with Sun (Dielli) and Fire (Zjarri) symbols, originally hand-drawn by J. C. Murray-Aynsley [Harriet Georgiana Maria Murray-Aynsley] (1827–1898), was published in 1891 in the journal Ars Quatuor Coronatorum (volume IV) in a study about the swastika.

=== 20th century ===
==== Edith Durham's research ====
During the first half of the 20th century, British anthropologist Edith Durham visited northern Albania and other areas of the western Balkans, in particular collecting and studying cultural and folklore material of the Albanian tribal society.

Durham found that in Bosnia tattooing was restricted to the Catholic Slavic population, while the Orthodox Slavic population rejected this practice, considering it "Latin". On the other hand, Durham found that in northern Albania it was widespread among Albanians regardless of their Catholic or Muslim faith.

Durham reported that girls were tattooed on March 19, which falls in the days of the Albanian spring celebrations.

== Patterns ==
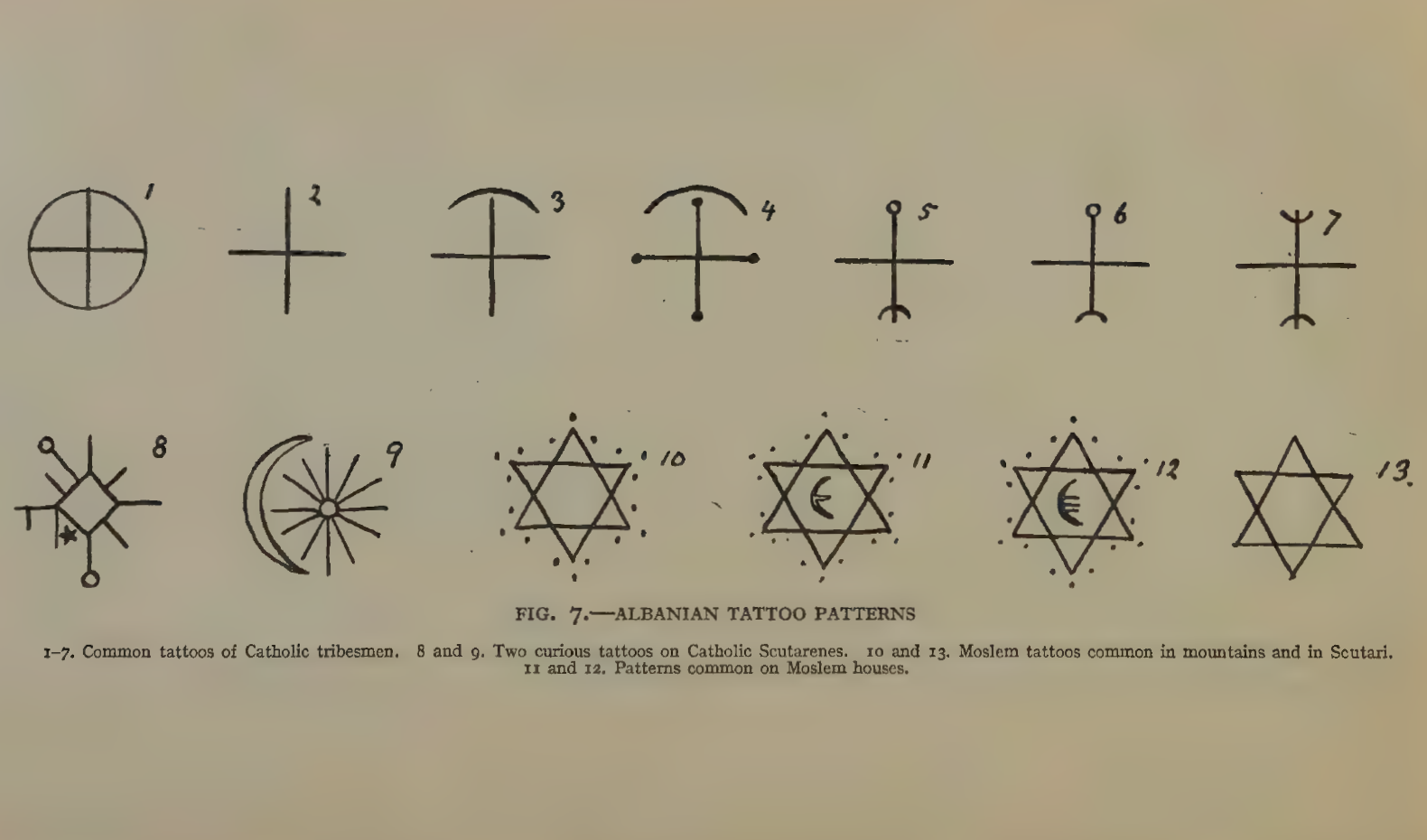
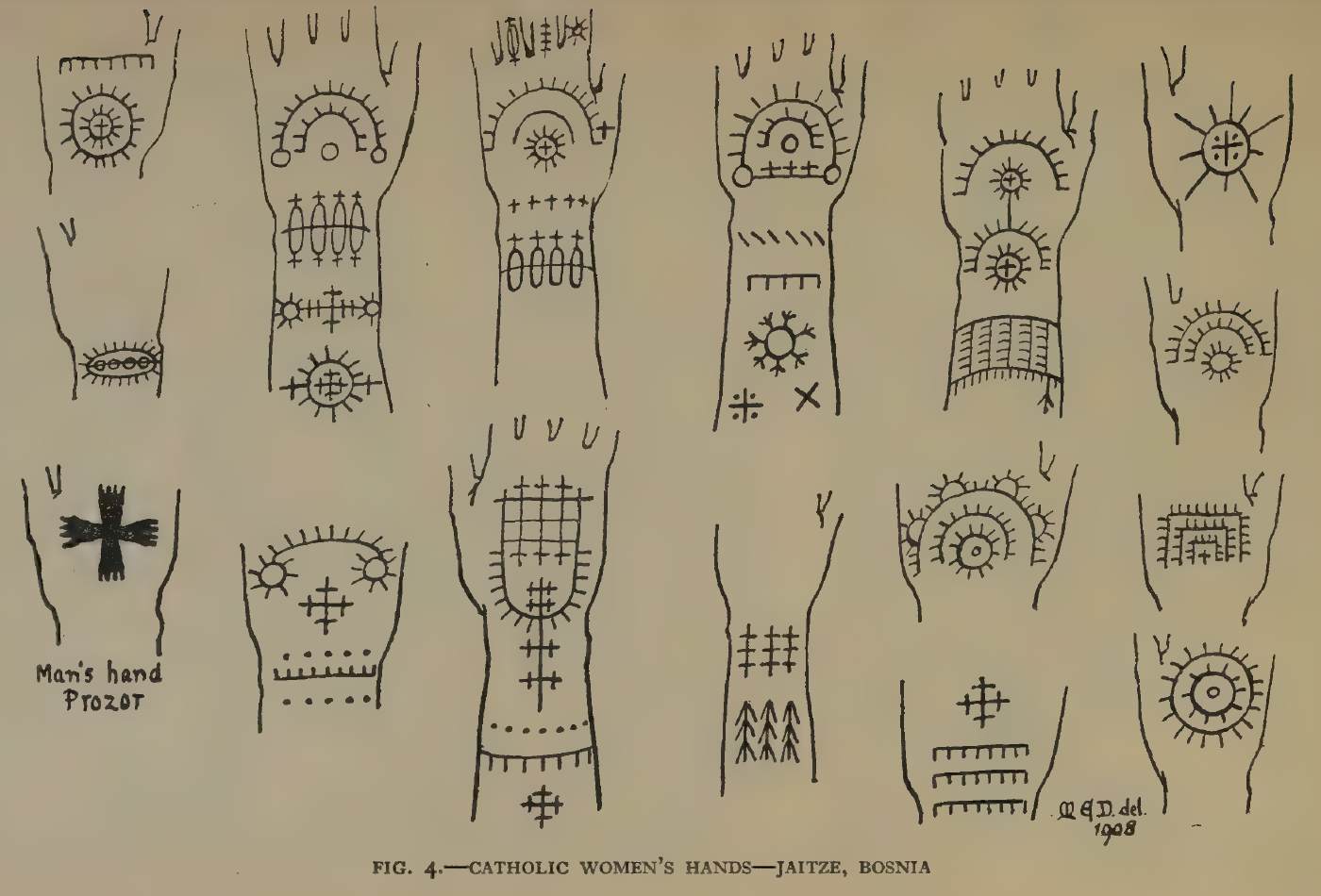
Tattoo patterns of northern Albanians (top); tattoo patterns of Catholic women (and one man) in Bosnia (bottom). Drawn by Edith Durham in the early 20th century. Many of those patterns also appear on Albanian traditional art (graves, jewellery, embroidery, and house carvings). They represent celestial, light, fire, and hearth worship, expressing the favor of the light within the dualistic struggle between light and darkness.

The most common patterns of Albanian traditional tattoos include suns (also stars), moons (or crescents), and crosses. These motifs also appear on various forms of Albanian traditional art, such as graves, jewelry, embroidery, and house carvings. They represent celestial, light, fire, and hearth worship, expressing the favor of light within the dualistic struggle between light and darkness in Albanian mythology.

Edith Durham, who extensively studied Balkan traditional tattooing alongside fieldwork research, was able to fully explain the patterns of traditional tattoos only after asking Albanians of Thethi–Shala for a description of all the little lines (or twigs) that accompanied a semicircle incised on an old gravestone. They answered that those twigs were "the light coming from the Moon, of course". For Albanians, the twigs or little lines were the traditional way to represent light, emanating from the Sun (Dielli) and from the Moon (Hana), which was often represented as a crescent. So, the patterns of Catholic tattoos in Bosnia, which until then were known as "circles, semicircles, and lines or twigs", were eventually clearly explained as compounds of rayed (emanating light) suns, moons, and crosses, from an expression of Nature-worship and hearth-worship. Furthermore, the crosses (including swastikas) have been explained by scholars as symbols of the deified Fire (Zjarri), and in particular of the fire god Enji, who evidently was the most prominent god of the Albanian pantheon in Roman times by interpreting Jupiter, when week-day names were formed in the Albanian language as Thursday (e enjte) was dedicated to him.

== Geographic distribution ==
Twentieth-century ethnographic research indicates that traditional tattooing was practiced across regions inhabited by Albanians.

== See also ==
- Albanian folklore
- Albanian paganism
- Culture of Albania

== Bibliography ==
- Durham, Edith (2004). Bejtullah D. Destani (ed.). Albania and the Albanians: Selected Articles and Letters, 1903–1944. I.B.Tauris. ISBN 1850439397.
- Durham, Edith (1928). Some tribal origins, laws and customs of the Balkans.
- Elsie, Robert (2010). Historical Dictionary of Albania (PDF). Historical Dictionaries of Europe. Vol. 75 (2 ed.). Scarecrow Press. p. 255. ISBN 978-0810861886. Archived from the original (PDF) on 6 October 2014.
- Lelaj, Olsi (2015). "Mbi tatuazhin në shoqërinë shqiptare" [On Tattoo in the Albanian Society]. Kultura Popullore. 34 (71–72). Centre of Albanological Studies: 91–118. ISSN 2309-5717.
- Murray-Aynsley, J. C. (1891). "Swastika". Ars Quatuor Coronatorum. IV.
- Norman, Camilla (2018). "Illyrian Vestiges in Daunian Costume: tattoos, string aprons and a helmet". In Gianfranco De Benedittis (ed.). Realtà medioadriatiche a confronto: contatti e scambi tra le due sponde. Atti del convegno Termoli 22-23 luglio 2016. Campobasso: Università degli Studi del Molise. pp. 57–71.
- Tirta, Mark (2004). Petrit Bezhani (ed.). Mitologjia ndër shqiptarë (in Albanian). Tirana: Mësonjëtorja. ISBN 99927-938-9-9.
- Treimer, Karl (1971). "Zur Rückerschliessung der illyrischen Götterwelt und ihre Bedeutung für die südslawische Philologie". In Henrik Barić (ed.). Arhiv za Arbanasku starinu, jezik i etnologiju. Vol. I. R. Trofenik. pp. 27–33.
