= Maga =

Maga, maga, or MAGA may refer to:

== Politics ==
- "Make America Great Again", a political slogan popularized by Donald Trump
  - Make America Great Again Inc., a Donald Trump super PAC
- Make America Go Away, protests against Trump's threats against Greenland

== People ==
- Maga (name), a list of people with the given name or surname
- Maga (footballer, born 1996), Brazilian women's football forward
- Maga (footballer, born 1999), Portuguese football defender

== Other uses ==
- Thespesia grandiflora, a tree commonly known as Maga
- Museo MAGA, a modern-art museum in Gallarate, Italy
- MAGA, Cornish for "grow, nurture or develop" the slogan of the Cornish Language Partnership
- Maga, Cameroon, a commune
- Blackwood's Magazine, a 1817–1980 British magazine nicknamed Maga
- Maga, an Egyptian crocodile deity sired by Set

== See also ==
- Krav Maga, an Israeli martial art
- Maga Brahmin, a class of Indian priests
- Mega (disambiguation)
- Magha (disambiguation)
- Magas (disambiguation)
- Magaly (disambiguation)
