= Pico Sacro =

Mountain in Boqueixón, Galicia, Spain

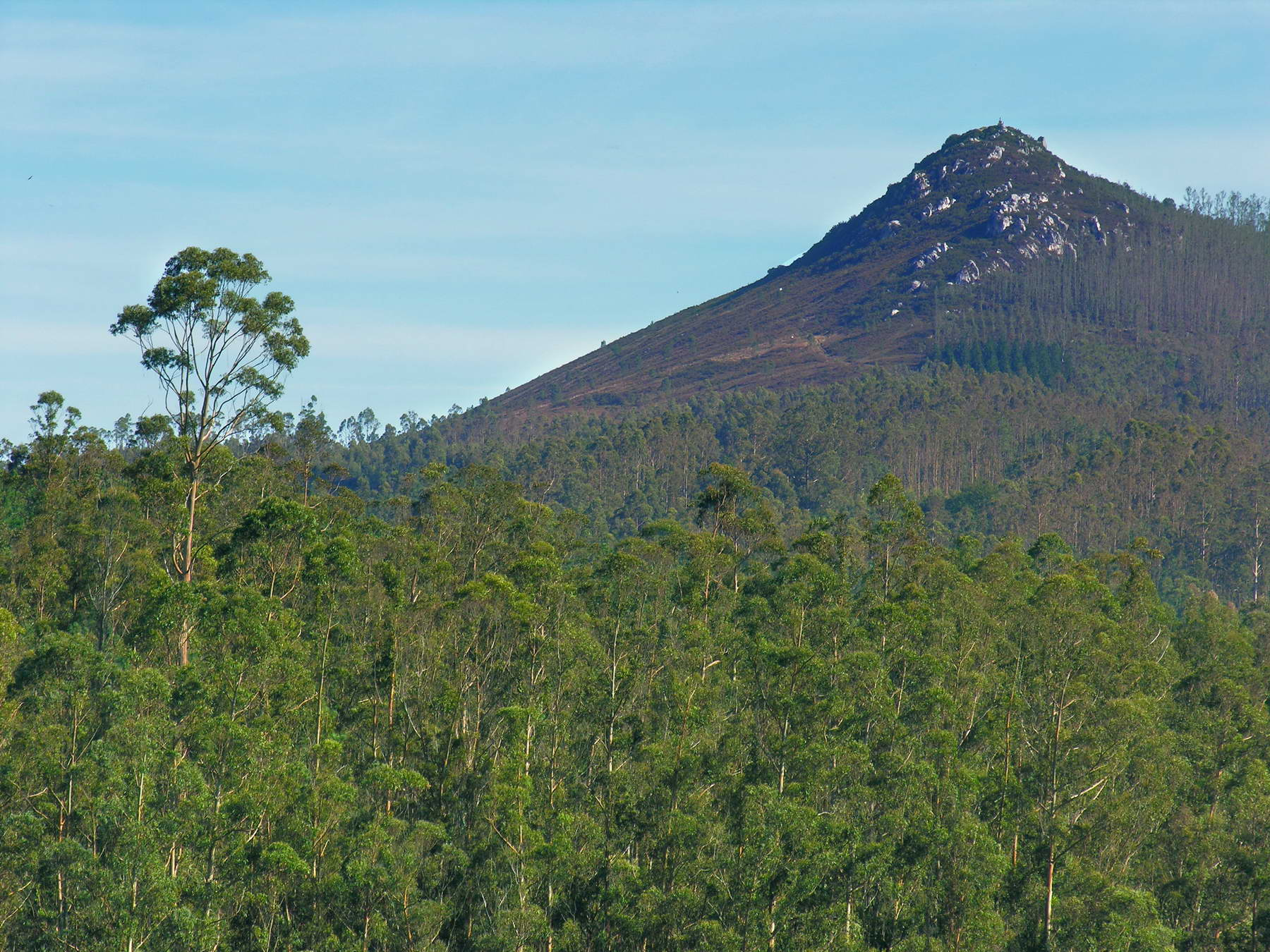

Highest point
- Elevation: 530 m (1,740 ft)
- Coordinates: 42°48′25.6″N 08°26′48.0″W

Geography
- Location within Spain
- Location: Galicia, Spain
- Parent range: Galician Massif

Climbing
- Easiest route: hike

Pico Sacro ("Holy Peak" in Galician) is a summit in the central Galician Massif and the municipality of Boqueixón. In antiquity it was known as Mount Ilicino, and features a hermitage, a cave, the remains of a medieval castle and a triangulation station. The mountain rises 530 meters (1,740 ft) and is known for its unique shape and a legend about the Apostle James. A deep and narrow cave sits just below the peak, and legend places a dragon there protecting one of the entrances to hell.

== Background ==
In Galician mythology, Queen Lupa sent the disciples of the Apostle James, Theodore and Athanasius, to Pico Sacro to collect her oxen to help build a tomb for the apostle. Lupa did not tell them that there was a cave with an entrance to Hell, and that a dragon lived there. The faith of the disciples protected them from the dragon and tamed the oxen.

The Camino Sanabrés, a branch of the Way of Saint James, passes by the foot of the mountain originating in Granja de Moreruela. The crest of the mountain is divided by a deep trench known as the "Rúa da Raíña Lupa" (English: Queen Lupa's path). The origin of the 2 by 6 metres (6.6 ft × 19.7 ft) gap is unknown; it may be a natural fissure, or the result of mining performed by the Romans. Fanciful tales attribute the cut to Queen Lupa or the sword of a Titan. Historian Antonio López Ferreiro hypothesized that the trench could have been used as a moat for the castle on the summit.

The Benedictine Monastery of San Sebastián was built below the mountain's peak at the beginning of the 10th century by Sisnando I, bishop of Iria Flavia. The monastery was later dismantled by Archbishop Alonso de Fonseca to build a castle.

The Castle of Pico Sacro was built in the Early Middle Ages near the top of the mountain, replacing a small chapel near the Monastery of San Sebastián. In the 15th century this fortress was destroyed during the Irmandiño revolts, but was later rebuilt by Archbishop Alonso de Fonseca to defend against the House of Altamira.

== Veneration ==
When an epidemic of Saint Anthony's fire was raging in Galicia, those afflicted would to go to the mountain and, after making an offering of bread at the summit, pray the following prayer:

Holy Peak, Holy Peak,
consecrated by the blessed Saint James,
deliver me from this angry fire,
through the intercession of the Virgin Mary,
and Our Father and a Hail Mary.

Or, simply: "Sacred Peak, Sacred Peak, heal me from the malady that consumes me. (Note: Pico Sagro, Pico Sagro, que te consagróu o bendito Sant-Iago, líbrame deste fogo airado, pola intercesión de la Virgen María, un Padre-nuestro e un Ave María. Ou, simplemente: "Pico Sagro, Pico Sagro, sáname do mal que eu trago.")

The academic Vicente Risco believes that this prayer dates from the 13th century, and notes that it is not addressed to any saint, but to the mountain itself as if it could hear and heal the person making the prayer.

== Gallery ==
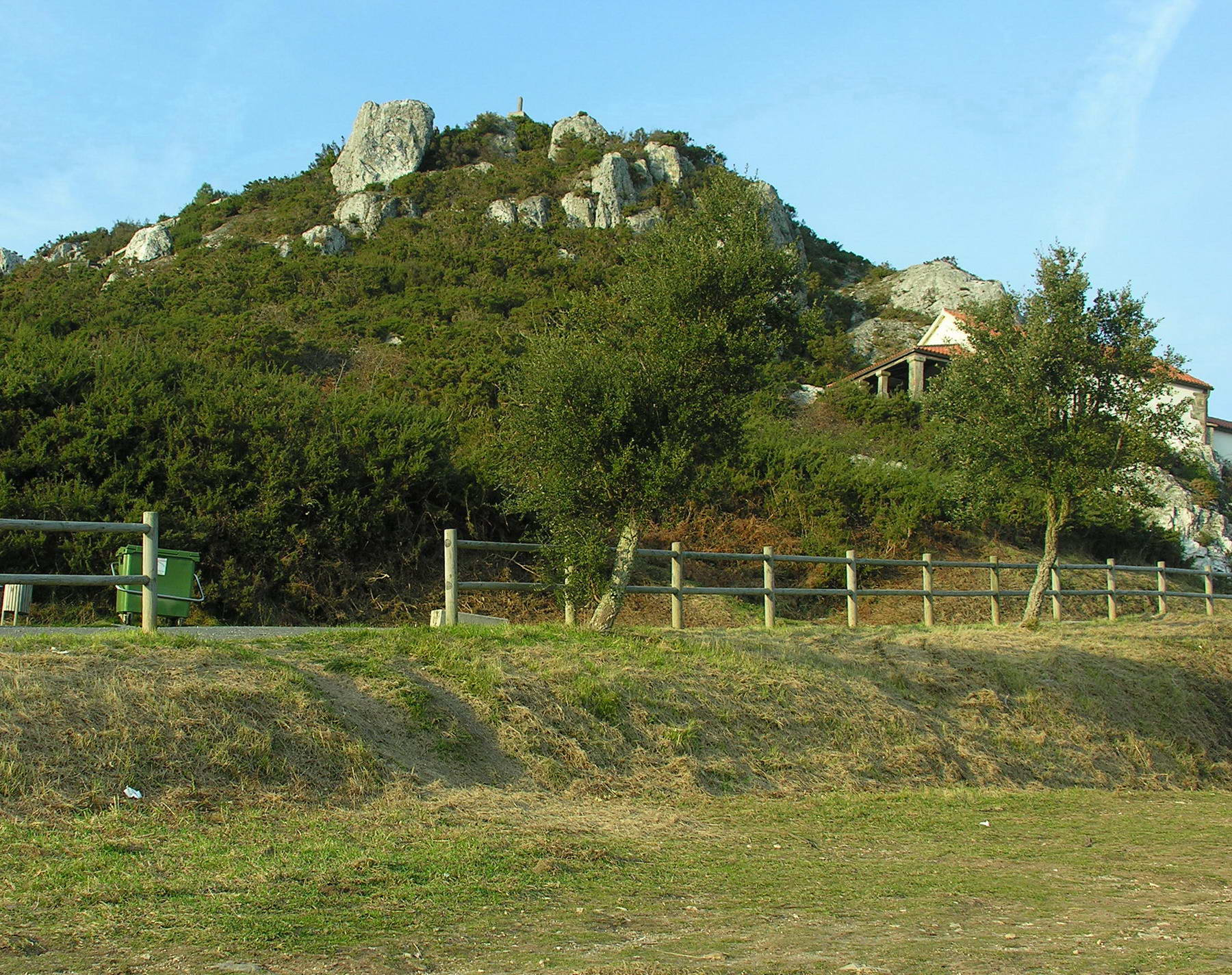
View of Pico Sacro

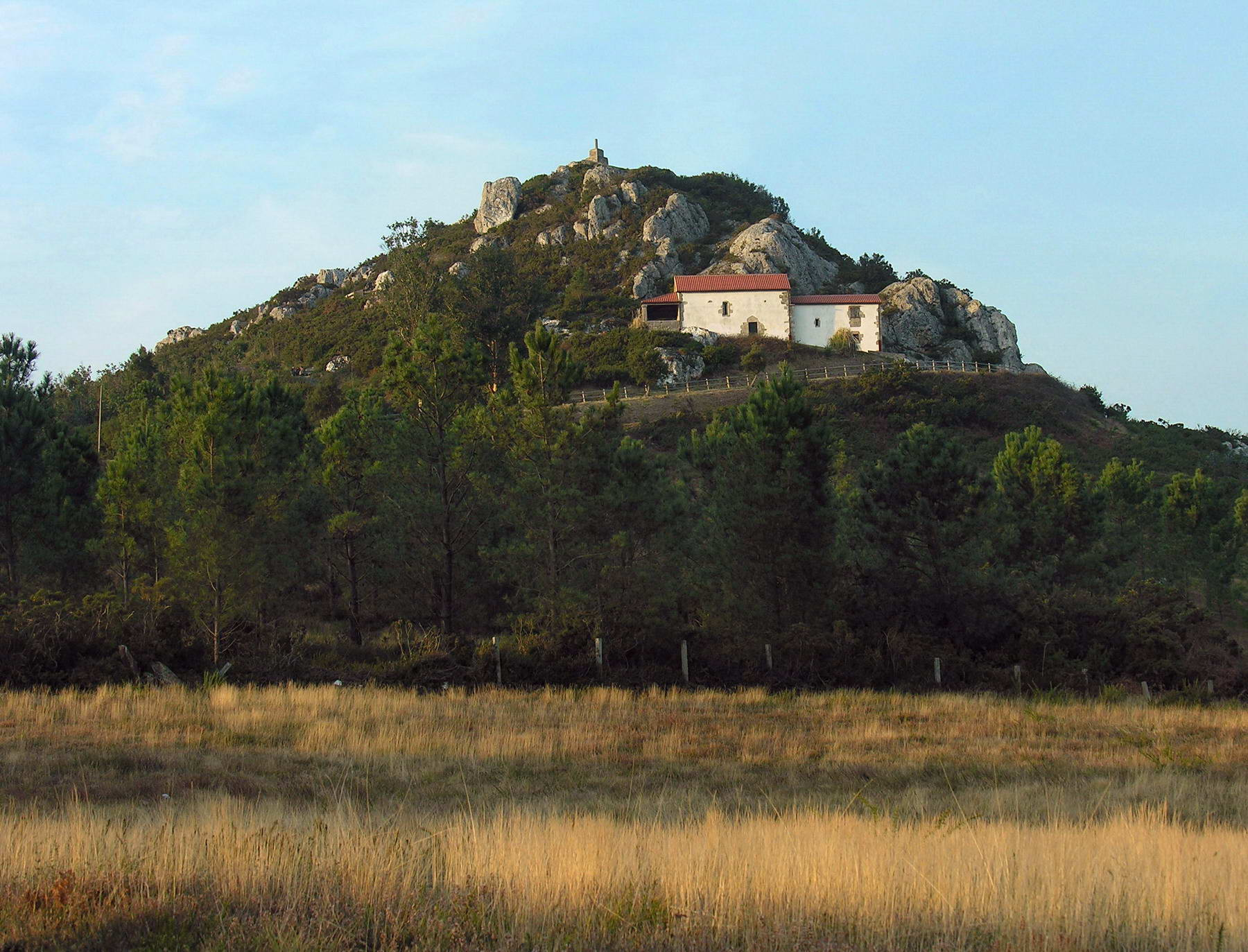
View of Pico Sacro

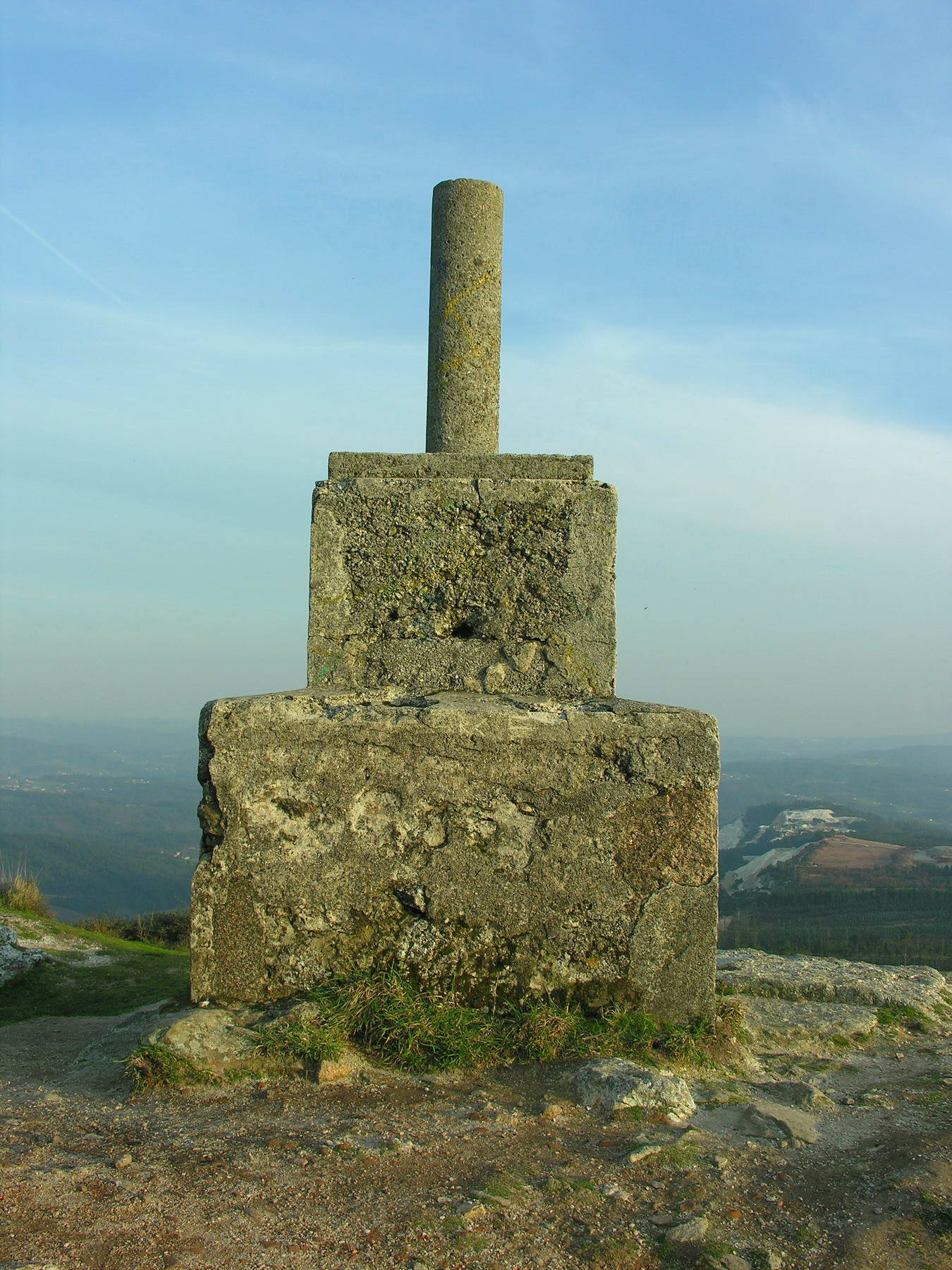
triangulation station atop Pico Sacro

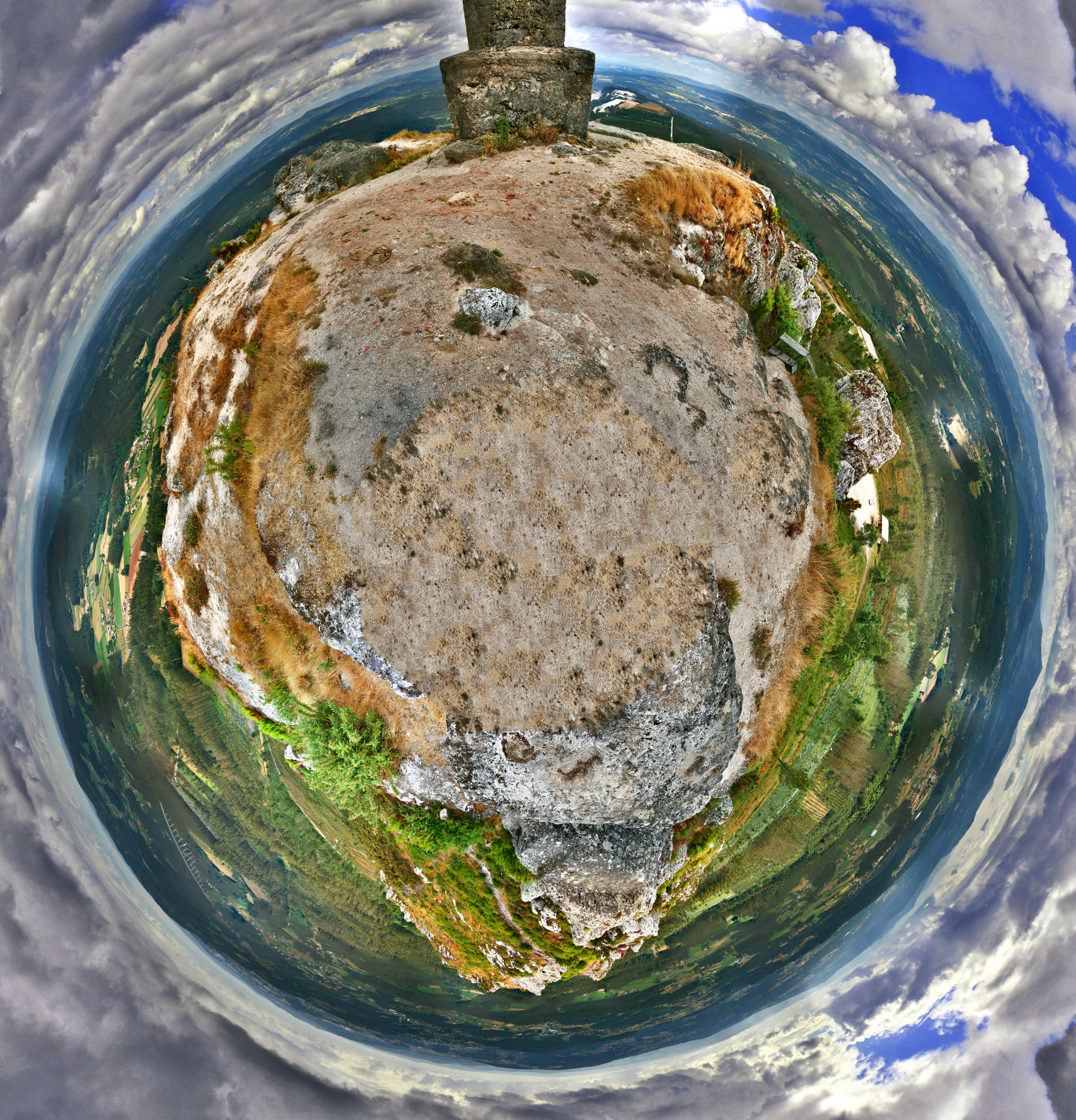
Polar panoramic from the top of Pico Sacro

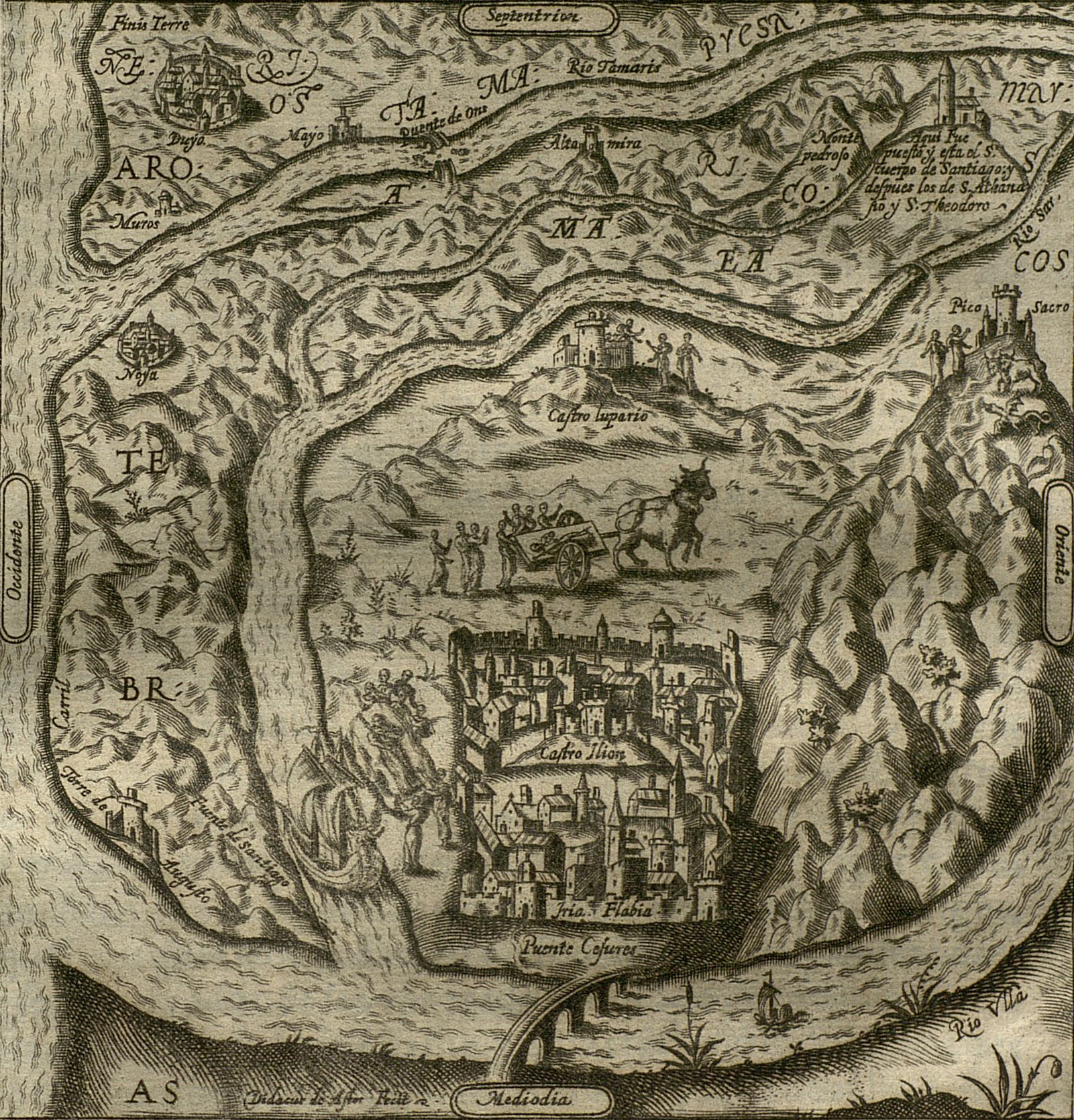
1610 - Map of the Jacobean legend in Historia del Apostol de Iesus Christo Sanctiago Zebedeo

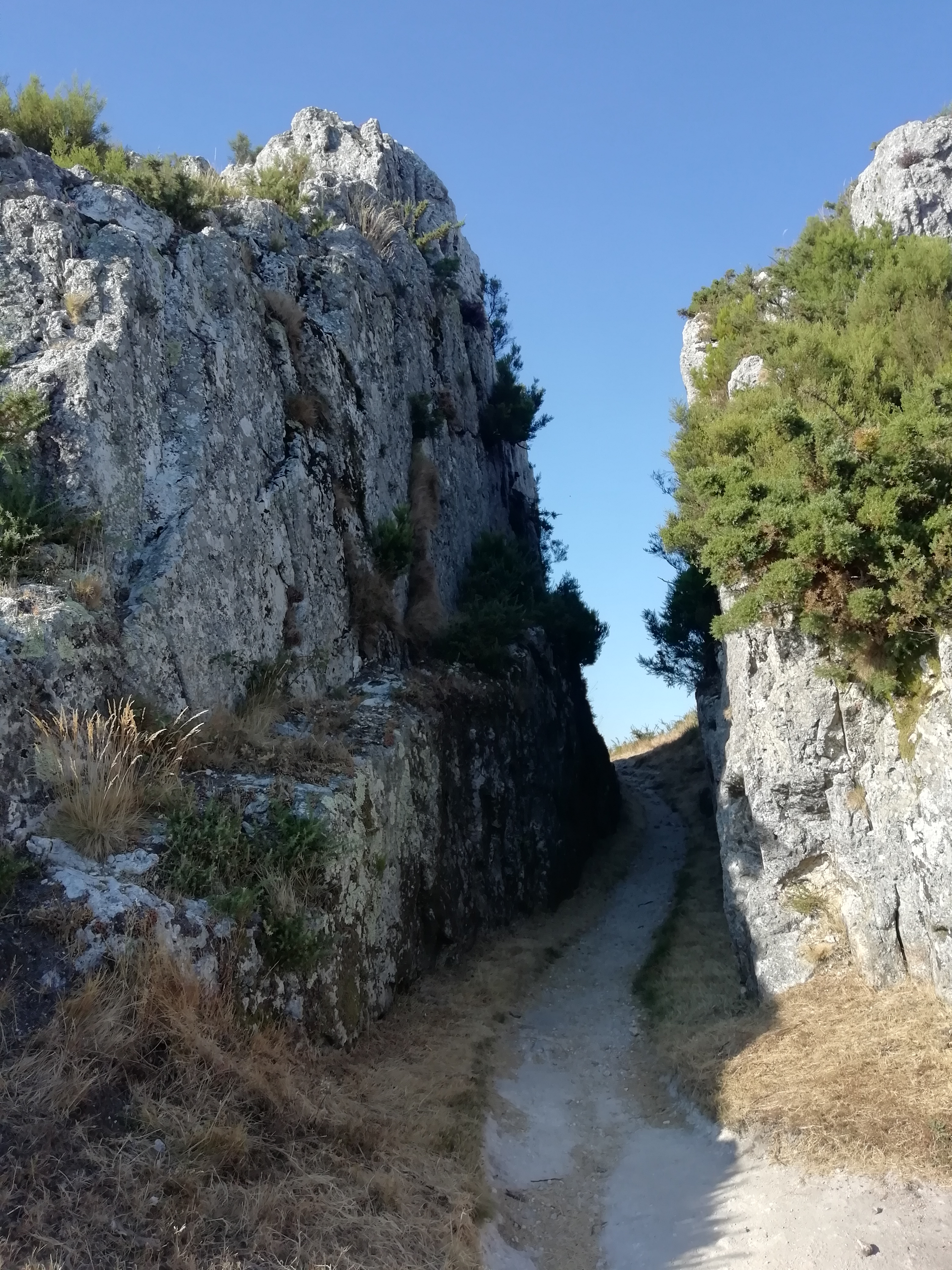
Queen Lupa's path

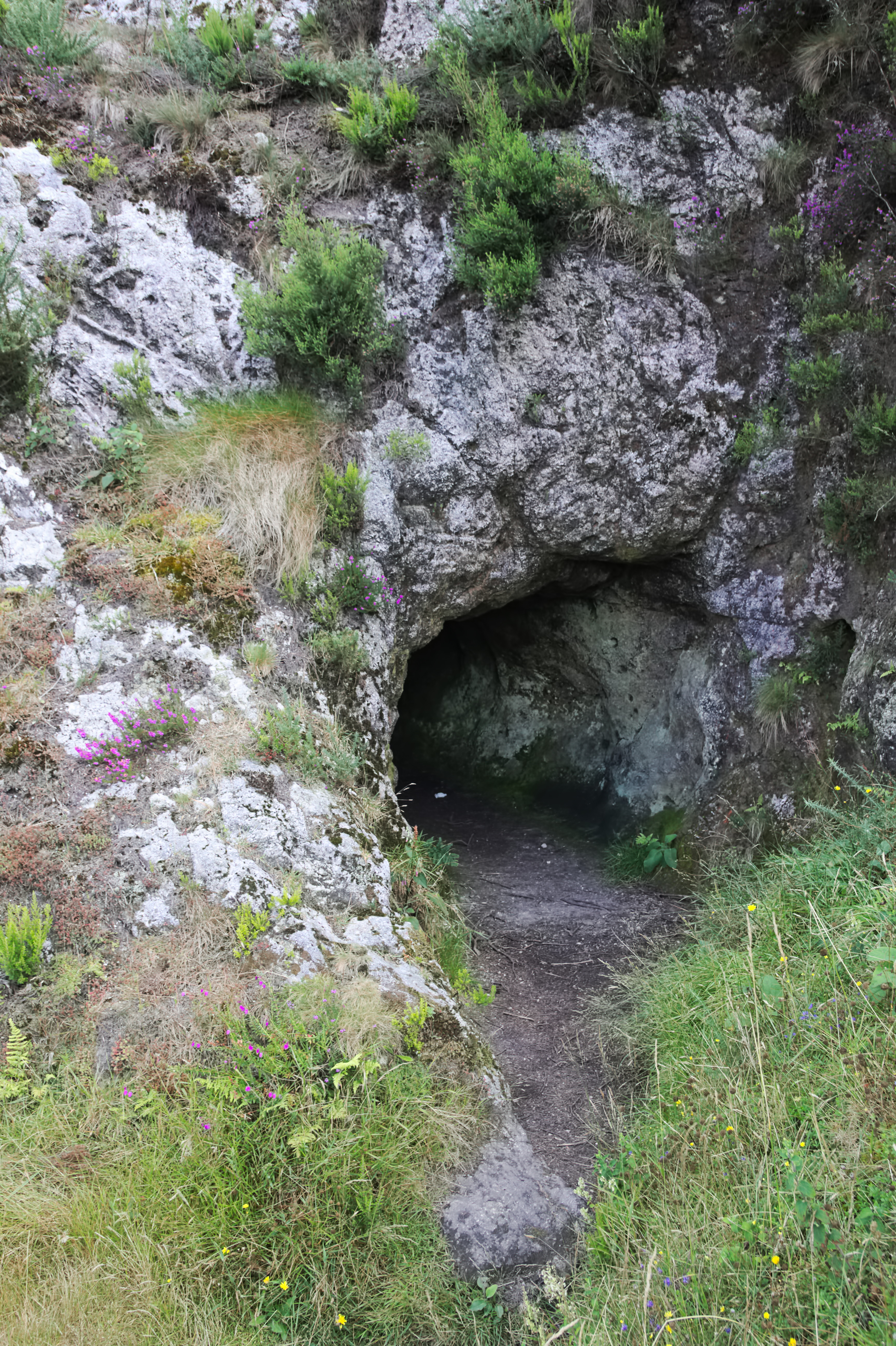
Pico Sacro cave

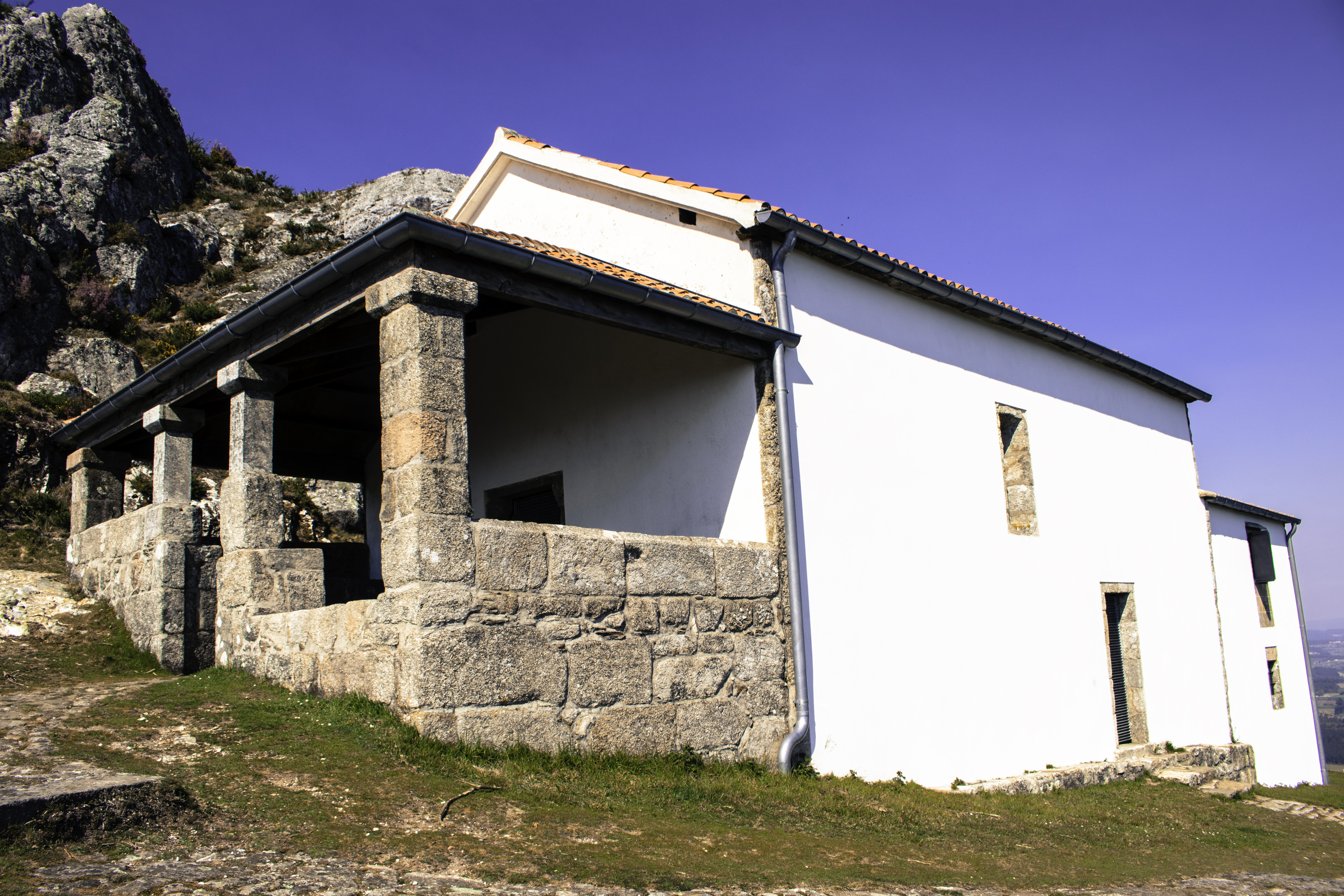
Church of San Sebastián do Pico Sacro

== See also ==
- Libredon
- Ulla (river)

== Bibliography ==
- As Montañas De Galiza (in Galician). A Nosa Terra. 2006. ISBN 978-8483411261.
- Risco, Vicente (1962). Ramon Otero Pedrayo (ed.). Etnogrfia: Cultura espritual. Historia de Galiza. Vol. I. Buenos Aires: Akal. pp. 255–777.
