= Magas =

Magas may refer to:

== Places ==
- Magas, Russia, the capital of the Republic of Ingushetia
- Magas, the Persian name of Maghas, the historical capital of medieval Alania
- Magas Urban Okrug, a municipal formation into which the town of republic significance of Magas in the Republic of Ingushetia, Russia is incorporated
- Magas Airport, an airport in the Republic of Ingushetia, Russia
- Magas, former name of Zaboli, a city in Iran
- Magās, a village in Semnan Province, Iran also known as Mazaj
- Magaš, Serbia, a village near Bojnik
- Magas, Guayanilla, Puerto Rico, a barrio

== People ==
- Ancient eastern-Mediterranean nobility:
  - Magas of Macedon, a Greek Macedonian nobleman and the father of Berenice I of Egypt
  - Magas of Cyrene, grandson of Magas of Macedon, Greek Macedonian governor, and King of Cyrene
  - Magas of Egypt, grandson of Magas of Cyrene
- Antonis Magas (born 1994), Greek footballer
- Boris Magaš (1930–2013), Croatian architect
- Ljubomir Magaš (1948–1986), Yugoslav amateur boxer, streetfighter, and gangster
- István Magas (born 1952), Hungarian water polo player
- Michela Magaš, Croatian-British entrepreneur
- Magas, nom de guerre of Ali Taziev (born 1974), former Ingush commander of Caucasian Front & life-sentenced prisoner in Russia

== Other ==
- Magas (brachiopod), a brachiopod genus
- Maga Brahmins, ancient Indian class of priests
- Magas, the Portuguese word for Meigas, witches from Galician mythology

== See also ==
- Maghas, the medieval capital of the Alans
- Maga (disambiguation)
