= Castle Lupario =

Ruined castle in Galicia, Spain

- Castro Lupario
- Bastavales, Brión, A Coruña in Spain
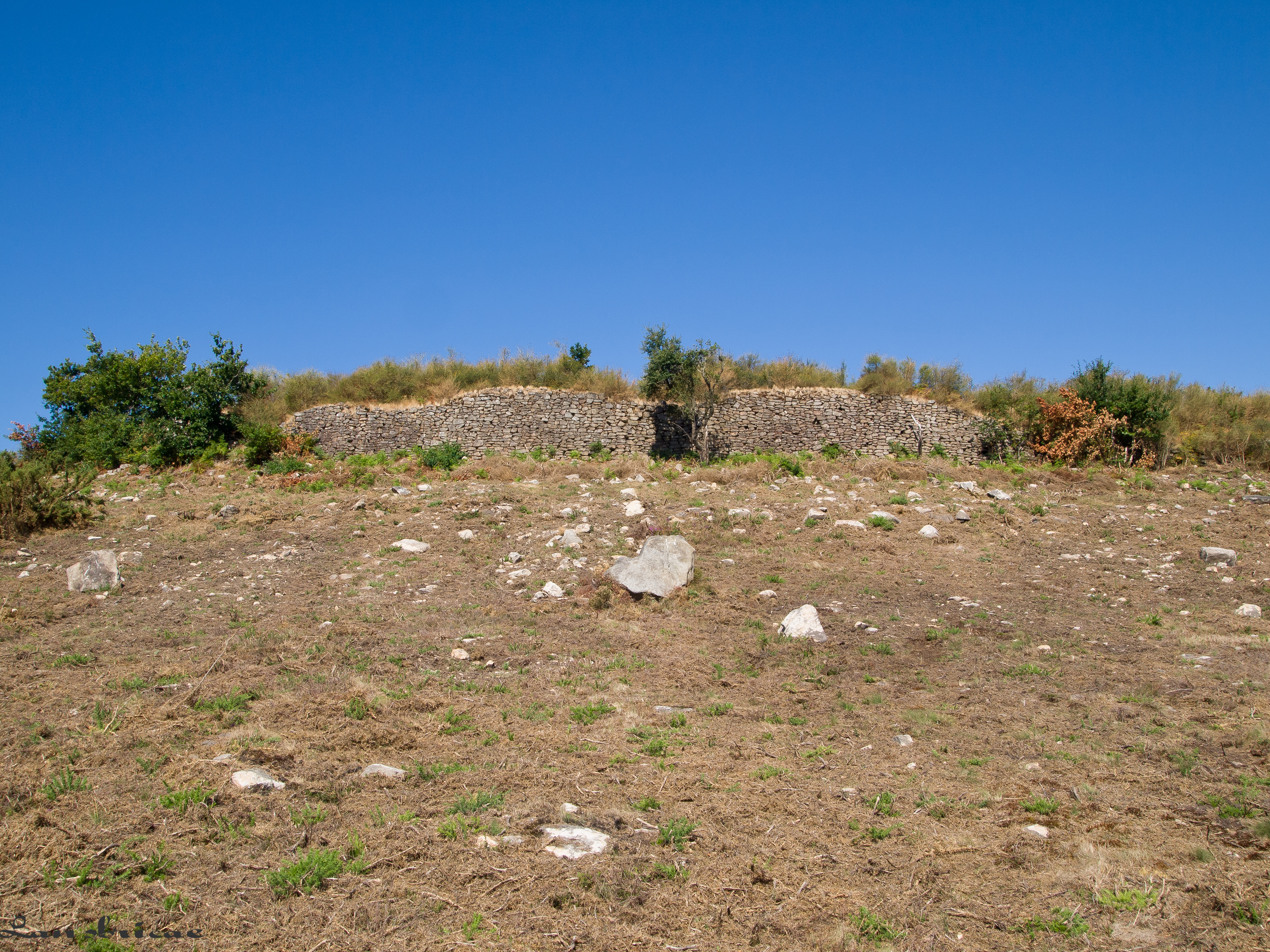
- Ruins of Castle Lupario

Location
- Coordinates: 42.813333°N 8.631667°W

The Castle Lupario, also known as the Castle Beca, is a Gallaeci castro located between the towns of Bastavales, (Brión) and Ribasar (Rois).

== Background ==
The site was declared an Asset of Cultural Interest in December 2009. It is easily accessible and remains of the walls can be seen. This caste complex was perhaps the capital of the Amaci (Astures) and came to achieve great importance. A parish church, Santo Antonini de Castro, existed on the site until the also existed here until the beginning of the 17th century.

The Liber Sancti Jacobi places Queen Lupa's residence at this castle.

== Gallery ==
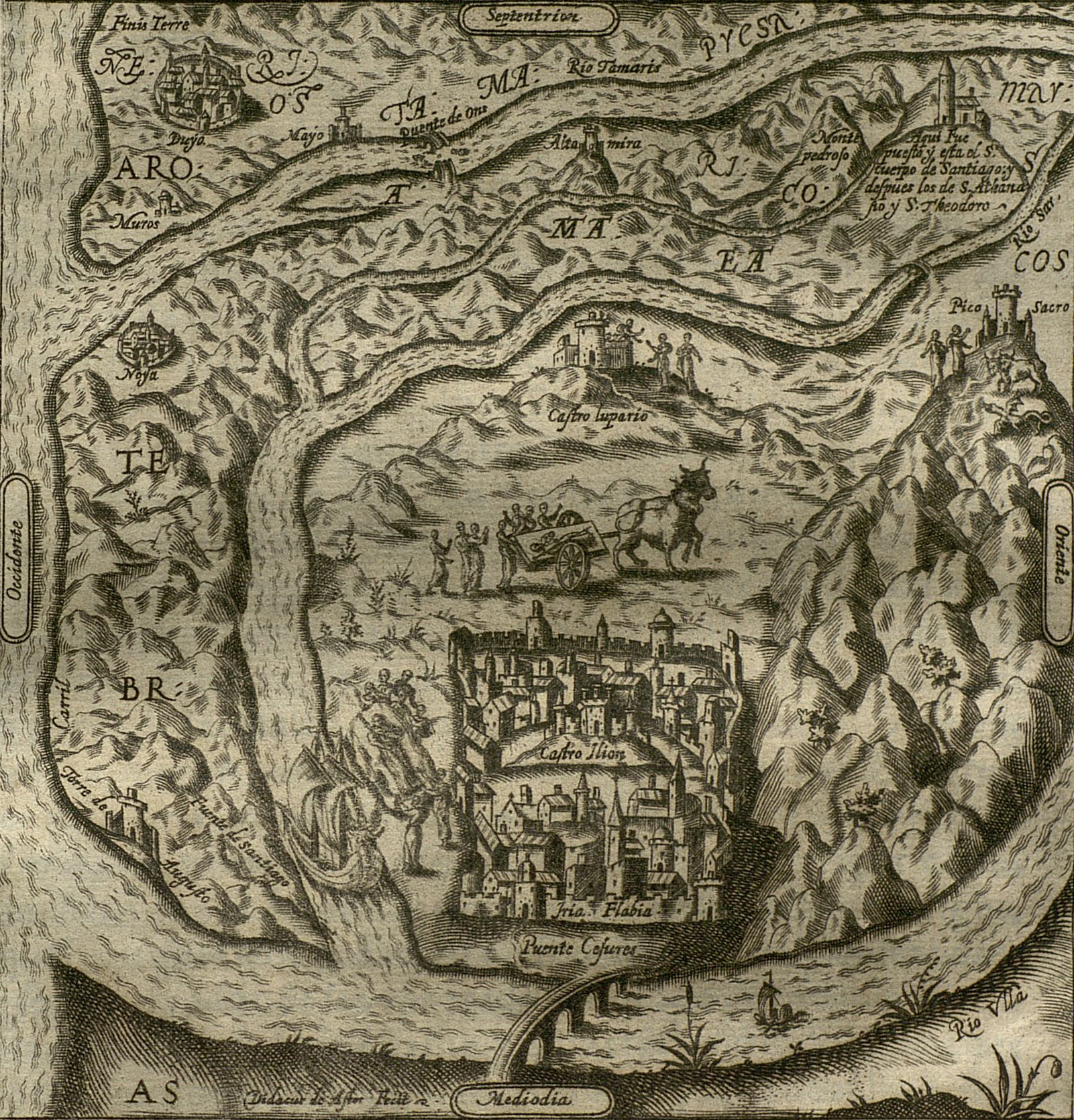
Map of the legend of the translation of relics in Historia del Apostol de Iesus Christo Sanctiago Zebedeo (1610), by Mauro Castellá Ferrer, in which the Castle Lupario appears.

=== See also ===
- Castro
- Castros in Galicia
- Iron Age Europe
- Castro culture
