= Sierra Raíña Loba =

Mountains of Galicia, Spain

The Serra da Raíña Loba is one of the mountain ranges of southern Galicia and is located between A Limia and the Serra do Larouco. It is made up of the Gomariz mountain range and the Cebreiro mountains. Its composition is mainly granite. The range gets its name from the historic Raíña Loba.

== Background ==
It holds important areas of oak forest with birches, European Pears and oaks. Another part is repopulated with pines and the rest are bushes and rocks.

The highest points are the Penedo da Raíña Loba (in the Gomariz range) with 1,161 meters (3,809 ft) above sea level, and the Cebreiro peak, with 1,265 (in the Cebreiro mountains, where the so-called Penedo das Fatigas also stands out at 1,258).

== Bibliography ==
- Caamaño Rivas, Víctor M.; Leiro, Adela; Daporta, Mon; Núñez Pérez, Manuel; Pontanilla Pérez, Isaac (2006). As montañas de Galiza (in Galician). A Nosa Terra. ISBN 84-8341-126-1.
