= Maghar =

Maghar or Mughar may refer to:

- Magghar, a month of Punjabi calendar
- Maghar, India, a town in Sant Kabir Nagar district in Uttar Pradesh
- Mughar, Iran, a village in Isfahan Province
- Maghar, Israel, an Arab town in northern Israel
- Al-Maghar, a Palestinian village depopulated in 1948
- Battle of Mughar Ridge, in World War I
- Al-Magar, in Saudi Arabia

== See also ==
- Magha (disambiguation)
