= Magha =

Magha (māgha, माघ or maghā, मघा) may refer to:

- Magha (month) (māgha, माघ), a month in the Hindu calendar (January–February)
  - Magh (Bengali calendar), the same month in the Bengali calendar
  - Magh (Nepali calendar)
  - Magh (Sikh calendar)
  - Magha Purnima, full moon in the Hindu month
  - Magha Bahula Chaturdashi, date in the month for the festival of Maha Shivaratri
  - Magha Shukla Chaturthi, date in the month for the festival of Ganesha Jayanti
- Magha (poet) (māgha, माघ), an 8th-century Sanskrit poet, who wrote Shishupala-vadha
- Magha (nakshatra) (maghā, मघा), a nakshatra (star or division of the sky) in Indian astronomy or astrology
- Magha Puja (Māgha Pūjā), a Southeast Asian Buddhist festival
- Kalinga Magha, a king of Sri Lanka, usurper from the Indian region of Kalinga

== See also ==
- Magh (disambiguation)
- Maga (disambiguation)
- Maghar (disambiguation)
- Megha (disambiguation)
