= Queen Lupa =

Mythological queen of Galicia, Spain

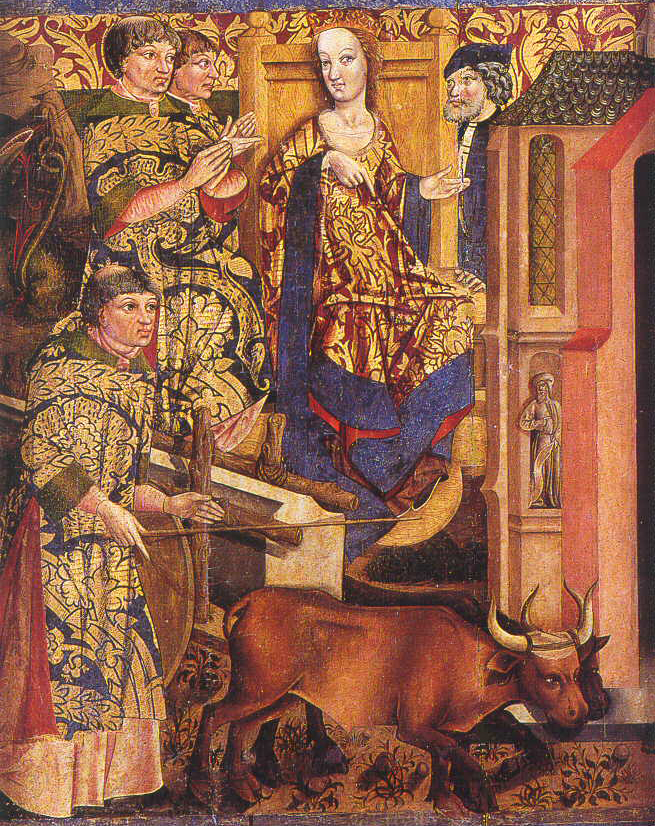
Portrait of Queen Lupa from the Museum of the Astorga Cathedral

Queen Lupa (also known as Raíña Lupa, Raíña Lopa, Raíña Luparia, Raíña Luca and Raíña Loba) is a character from Galician mythology. She is mentioned in both the Codex Calixtinus and the Golden Legend involving the translation of the body of the Apostle James by his disciples. Her name alludes to her cunning, and she is written as being a roadblock to the disciples of the Apostle James, Theodore and Athanasius, as they search for a place to entomb his body. She eventually sees her error and converts to Christianity.

Her story is well known throughout Galicia and she still influences the culture of that portion of Spain. Her story is integral to the translation of the relics of the apostle, and her home is along the route of the Portuguese Way to Santiago de Compostela.

== Legend ==
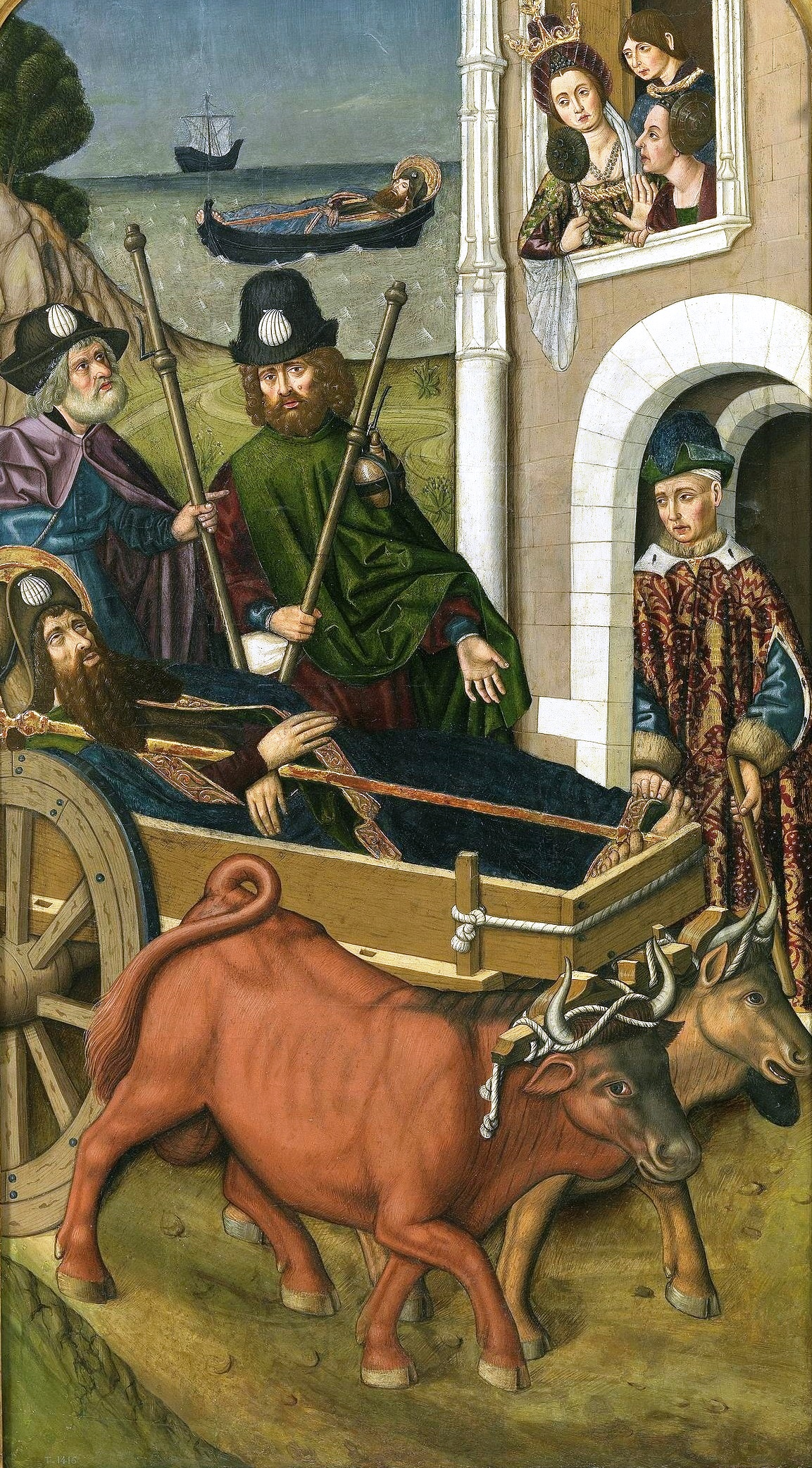
The transfer of the body of Saint James by his disciples at the castle of Queen Lupa

Galician tradition holds that Lupa, a widowed noblewoman, lived in Castro Lupario, along what is now called the Portuguese Way. She appears in Book III (Liber de translatione corporis sancti Jacobi ad Compostellam) of the 12th-century Codex Calixtinus, which contains a story regarding what was done with the body of the Apostle James after his martyrdom. According to the story, after their arrival in Iria Flavia, James's disciples Theodore and Athanasius approached the queen about giving them a place to bury James's body. Lupa chose to trick the disciples and sent them to the King of Duio with the intent of having them killed. The king imprisons them, but they are freed by an angel and return to the queen.

Then according to the Golden Legend, Lupa tried deceiving them and sent them to Mount Ilicino (now known as "Pico Sacro") to collect some of her oxen to carry the necessary material to build the tomb. She did not tell them that a cave in the mountain was the entrance to hell and was guarded by a dragon. However, the presence of the holy cross protected the disciples from harm and tamed the bulls. Upon witnessing the miraculous events, Lupa converted to Christianity and helps build the apostle's tomb in Libredon. It is also said that upon her conversion, she turned her home into a church.

Among the stories about Lupa is one collected from an elderly Galician peasant about the queen living on Pico Sacro:

Queen Lupa lived in O Pico Sacro. There was a servant of a house who took the pigs to graze to the mountain. This servant realized that some of the pigs were fattening a lot so he decided to follow them. He went to a cave. There he met Queen Lupa. She told him she would feed the pigs and in return when the animals were slaughtered he should give her the best pork sausages of the best pork. He accepted. When the owner of the pigs, an old woman, heard of it, instead of taking her the best pork sausages, she took her the worst. Queen Lupa throw the deception back in the old woman’s face and told her she was going to punish her. The pork sausages turn into snakes, which eat her. Her skeleton can still be seen at the bottom of the well

Lupa's relationship with Pico Sacro is strong. Author H.W. Howes writes about stories of her castle being located there and that a "half-human monster guards her hidden treasure."

Her name, "Lupa," recalls the Spanish word "lupino" (meaning "characteristic of or relating to wolves"), which in turn is derived from Latin lupus. The folklore of Galicia holds many tales of "Lobishome." Her name may be an allusion to her she-wolf-like nature. Lupa's legacy is subject to multiple interpretations. While her myth is popular among Catholics, others think that Lupa could be the representation of a pre-Christian goddess, perhaps the female version of Lugh. Galician Academic Manuel Gago Mariño has written about Lupa and notes that in the Middle Ages, portions of the Galician aristocracy claimed to descend from her. Lupa is said to be buried at the Castle of Saint George, on Mount Pindo.

== In popular culture ==
The pilgrim's scallop, used by travelers on the camino, may also be related to the queen. One version of the story of James's body being brought to Galicia from Jerusalem tells of the ship as it approached land. The wedding of the daughter of Queen Lupa was taking place on shore. The groom was on horseback, and upon the ship's approach, his horse got spooked, and horse and rider fell into the sea. They both emerged from the water alive, covered in seashells.

Today, there is a deep cut (2 by 6 metres (6.6 ft × 19.7 ft)) at the top of Pico Sacro known as the "Rúa da Raíña Lupa" (English: Queen Lupa's path). The cut may be a natural fissure, or the result of mining performed by the Romans. Local legend attributes the cut to Queen Lupa, or the sword of a Titan. Some tales place her castle on Pico Sacro, and that the cut was part of its defenses.

A number of pieces of art feature her, among them the Traslado del cuerpo de Santiago el Mayor ante el palacio de la reina Lupa by Martín Bernat is on display in the Museo del Prado. Lupa still holds the imagination of many people, with Castle Lupario being a tourist site. On 2 July 2016, the opera A Raíña Lupa, with music by the Galician composer Fernando Vázquez Arias and a libretto by Xoán Pérez, premiered at the Teatro Colón in A Coruña.

The Sierra Raíña Loba is named after Lupa. The Raíña Lupa Award is given for Galician works of children's literature.

== Gallery ==
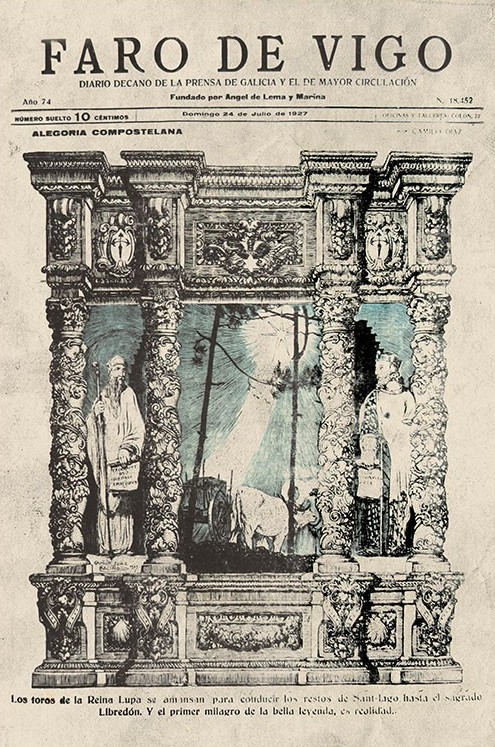
Faro de Vigo from 24 July 1927. Story by Camilo Díaz on National Day of Galicia Queen Lupa's bulls lead the remains of Saint James to the sacred Libredón.

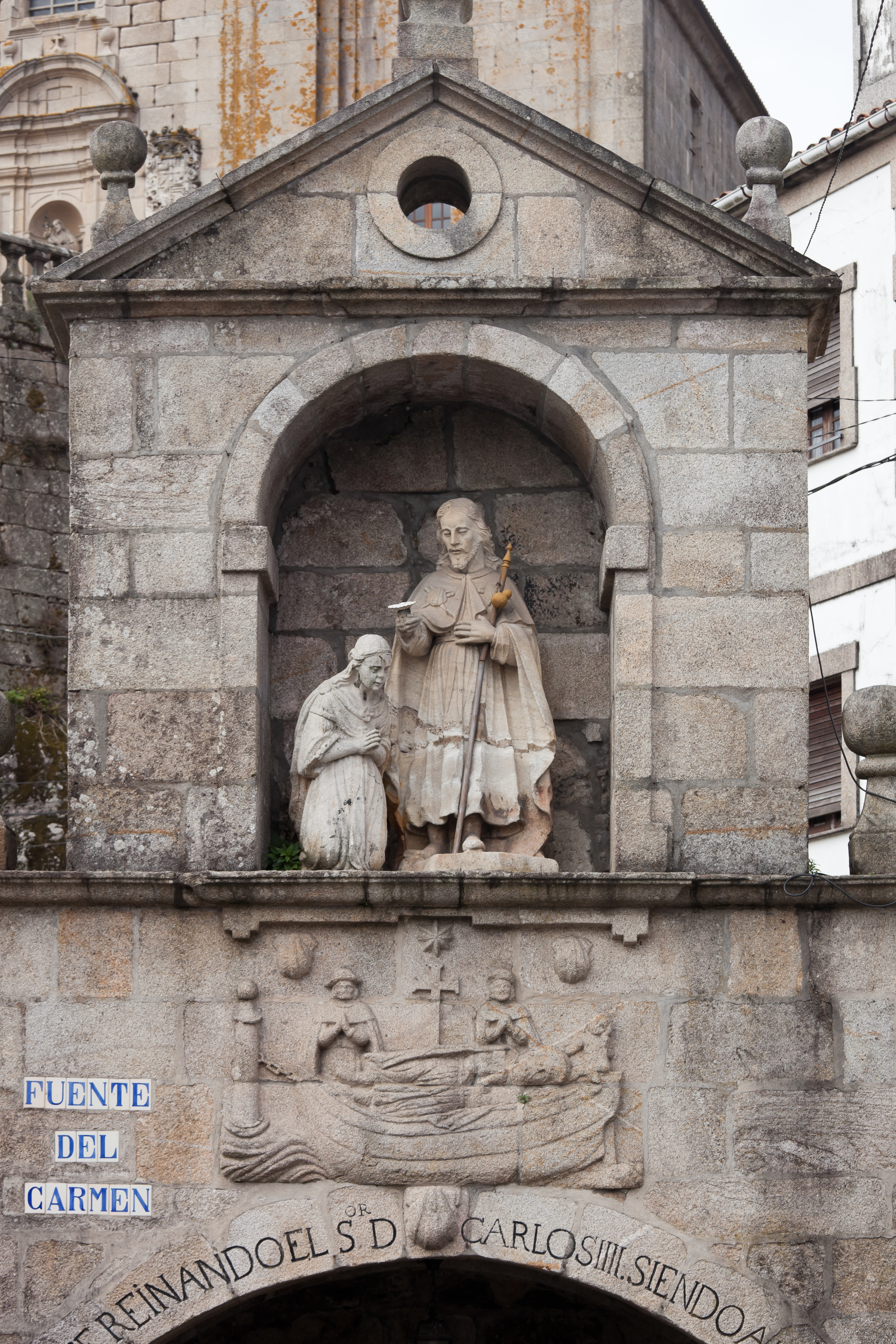
Baptism of Queen Lupa by Saint James. Fountain of Carmen, Padrón

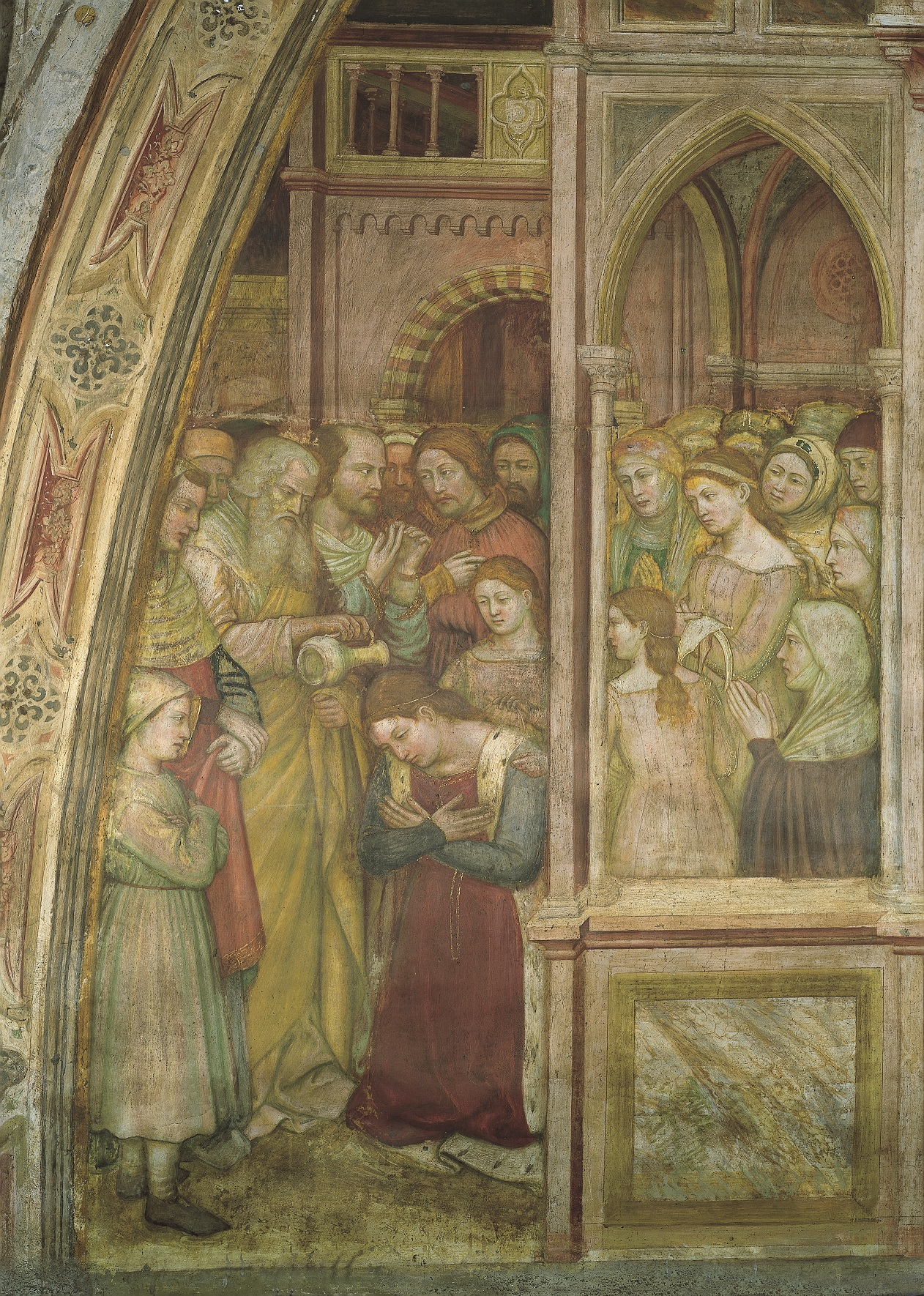
The Chapel of St. James, in the Basilica of Saint Anthony of Padua, with frescoed walls depicting the Stories of St. James (Queen Lupa is featured there)

== See also ==
- Ponte Caldelas

== Bibliography ==
- Cuba, Xoán Ramiro [in Galician]; Miranda, Xosé [in Galician]; Reigosa, Antonio [in Galician] (1999). Dicionario dos seres míticos galegos [Dictionary of Galician mythical beings]. Vigo: Edicións Xerais de Galicia. p. 212. ISBN 84-8302-363-6.
