= A Raíña Lupa =

Galician Opera

- Opera by Fernando V. Arias
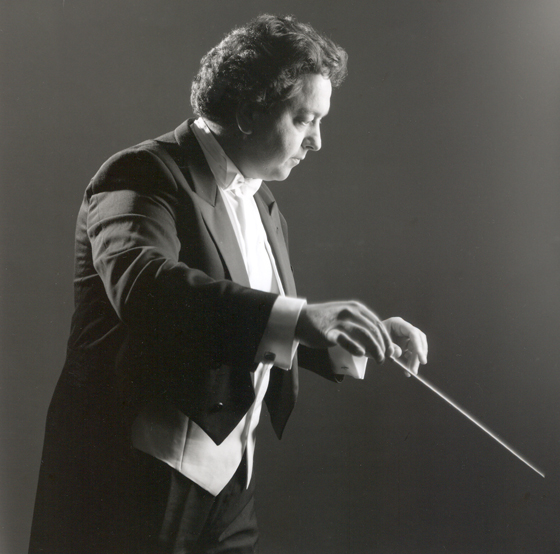
- Fernando Vázquez Arias en 2007.
- Translation: Queen Lupa
- Librettist: Xoán Pérez
- Language: Galician
- Based on: Legend of Queen Lupa
- Premiere: July 2, 2016; Teatro Colón

A Raíña Lupa (English: Queen Lupa) is an opera in three acts with music by Fernando V. Arias and a libretto in Galician by Xoán Pérez about the legend of Queen Lupa.

== Roles ==
Cast	Tessitura	Cast at the premiere, 2 July, 2016 Director: Fernando V. Arias
Lupa	soprano	Teresa Novoa
Régulo	tenor	Javier Palacios
Teodoro	tenor	Diego Neira
Atanasio	Bass	Gabriel Alonso
Torcuato	barítono	Axier Sánchez
Briana	soprano	Clara Jelihovschi
Eire	soprano	Alba López
Brenda	mezzosoprano	Mª José Ladra

== See also ==
- Galician operas
