= Maga (name) =

Maga and Magà are given names, and Maga and Mága are surnames. Notable people with these names include:

== Given name ==
- Maga of Characene, a 2nd-century king in the Middle East
- Maga Bo, American Brazilian DJ, producer, sound engineer and ethnomusicologist
- Magà Ettori (born 1972), Corsican filmmaker
- Maga Magazinović (1882–1968), Serbian librarian and journalist
- Maga.Tamizh Prabhagaran, Indian Tamil journalist and documentary film maker

== Surname ==
- Hubert Maga (1916–2000), politician from French Dahomey (now known as Benin)
- Miguel Maga (born 2002), Portuguese football right-back
- Othmar Mága (1929–2020), German music conductor
- Zoltán Mága (born 1974), Hungarian violinist

== See also ==
- Maga (disambiguation)
