= Brión =

Municipality in Galicia, Spain

Coordinates: 42.867°N 8.678°W

Concello de Brión
- Municipality
- Coat of arms
- Nickname: Brión
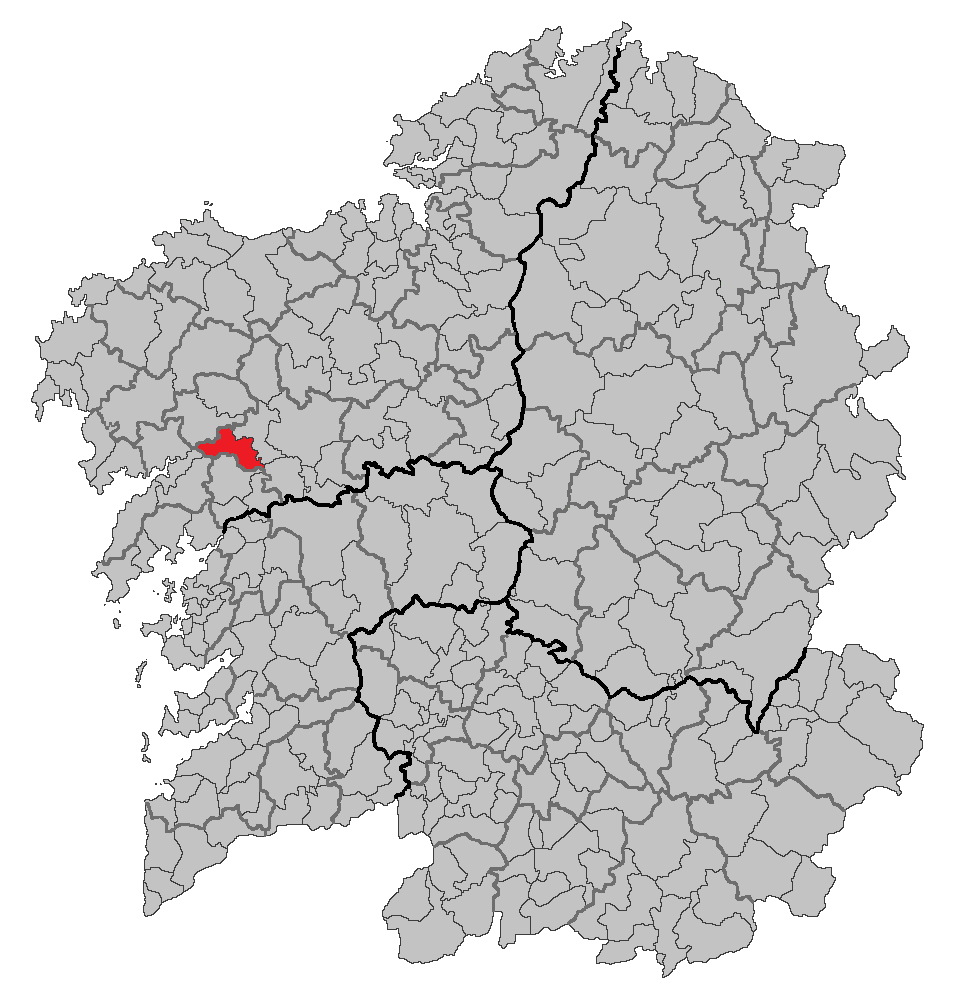
- Location of Brión within Galicia
- Parroquias: Brión, Os Ánxeles, San Salvador de Bastavales, Bastavales, Boullón, Viceso, Luaña, Ons and Cornanda

Government
  - Alcalde (Mayor): Pablo Lago Sanmartín (PSdG)

Area
  - Total: 74.9 km^{2} (28.9 sq mi)

Population (2025-01-01)
  - Total: 8,192
  - Density: 109/km^{2} (283/sq mi)
- Time zone: UTC+1 (CET)
  - Summer (DST): UTC+2 (CEST)

Brión (Galician: [bɾiˈoŋ]) is a municipality in the province of A Coruña, in the autonomous community of Galicia in northwestern Spain. It belongs to the comarca of Santiago de Compostela and is 13 km to the east of Santiago de Compostela. It has an area of 74.9 square kilometres (28.9 sq mi), and a population of 7,519 inhabitants (2014).

== History ==
Remains of megalithic culture are preserved, such as the Raña Longa mamoas field. The castro culture is preserved in the archaeological site of Santa Cecía, Castle Lupario, or the castles of Lamiño, Boullón, Forxán, Pousada, Vioxo and Ons. Due to the Romanization of Galicia, through these lands the Roman road passed through to the sea. The Romans also built the hypocaust of Cirrus.

== Gallery ==
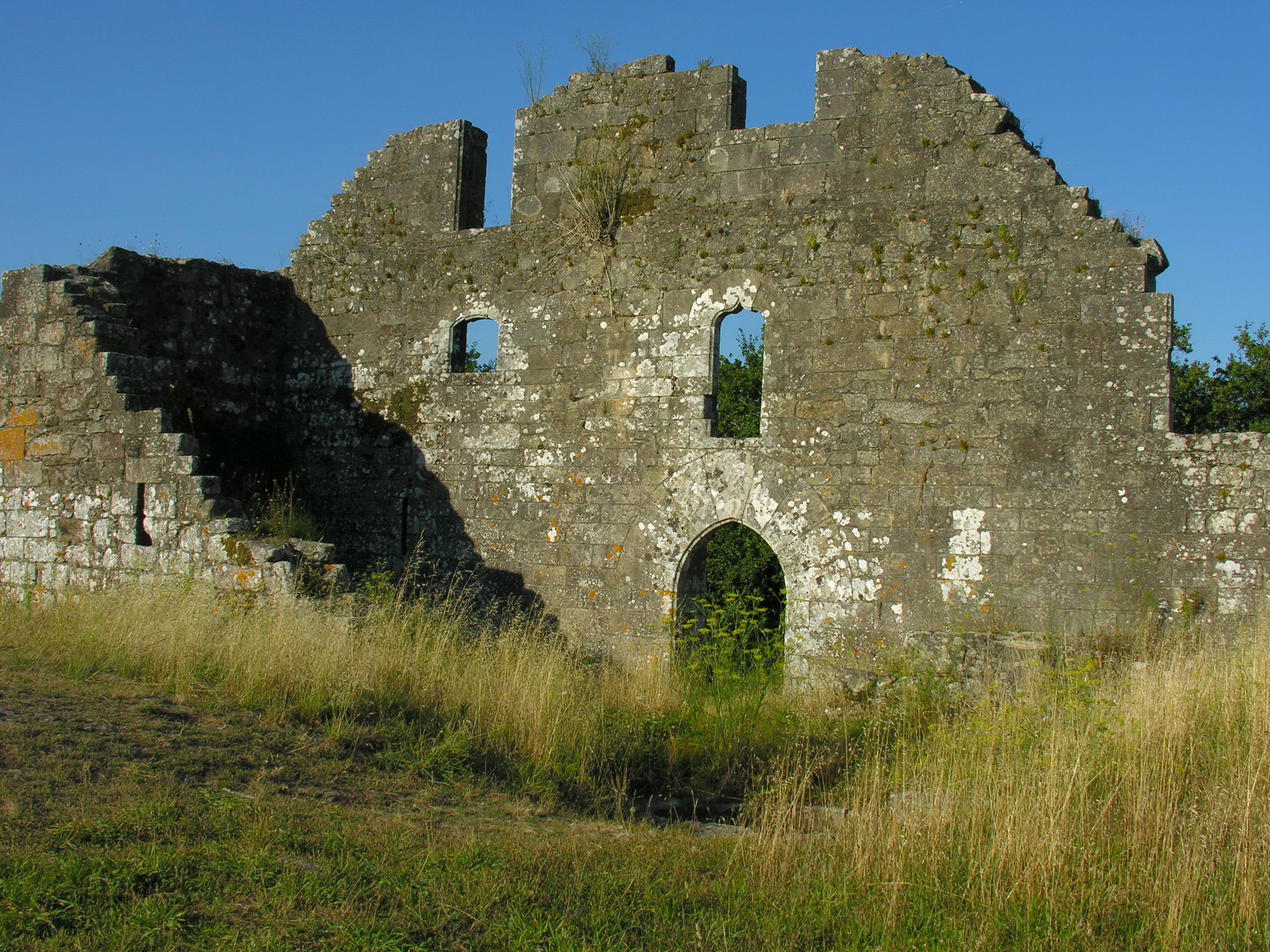
Towers of Altamira in Brión

== See also ==
List of municipalities in A Coruña
