= Boqueixón =

Municipality in A Coruña, Spain

Concello de Boqueixón
- Municipality
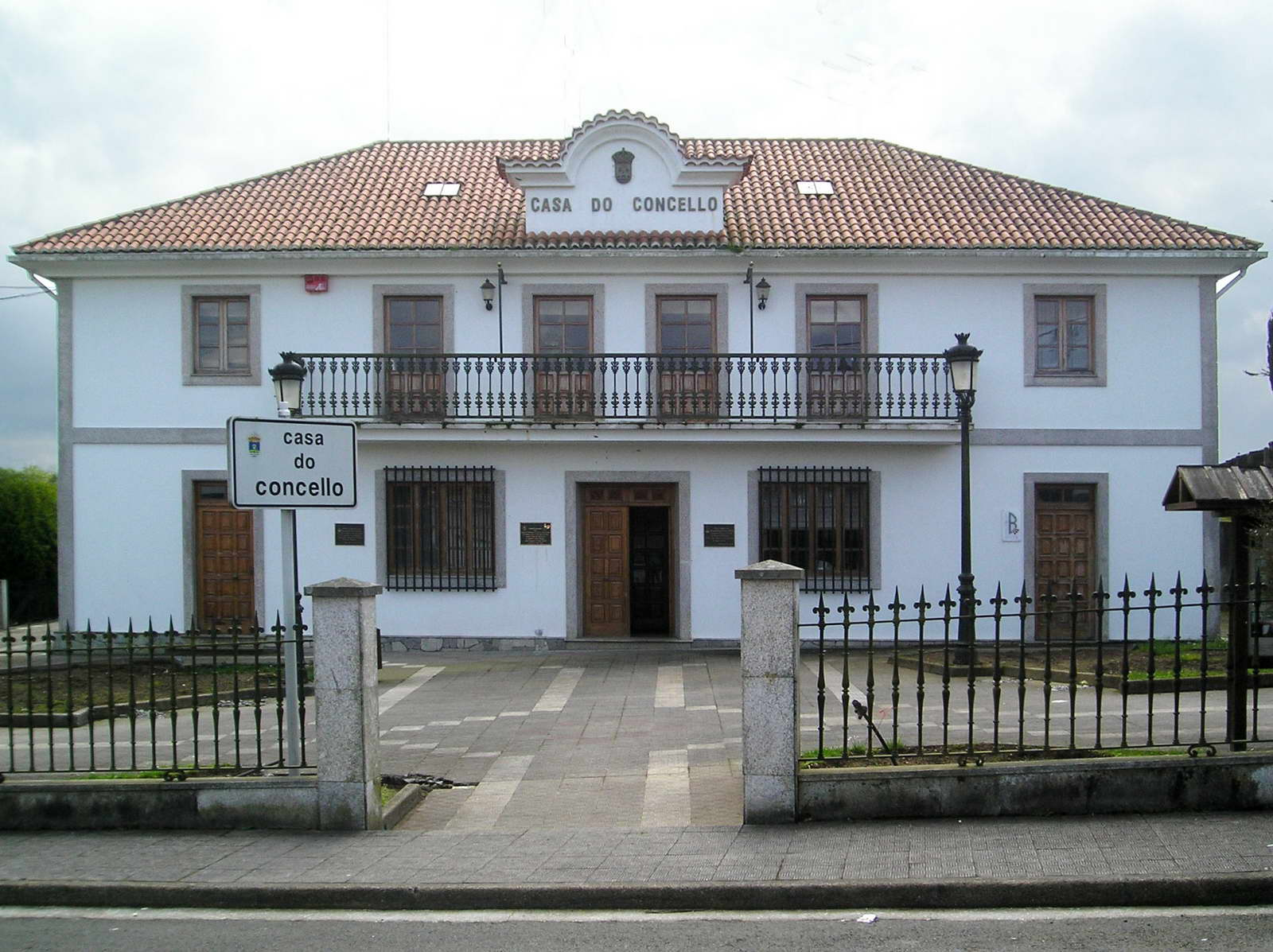

- Coat of arms
- Nickname: Boqueixón
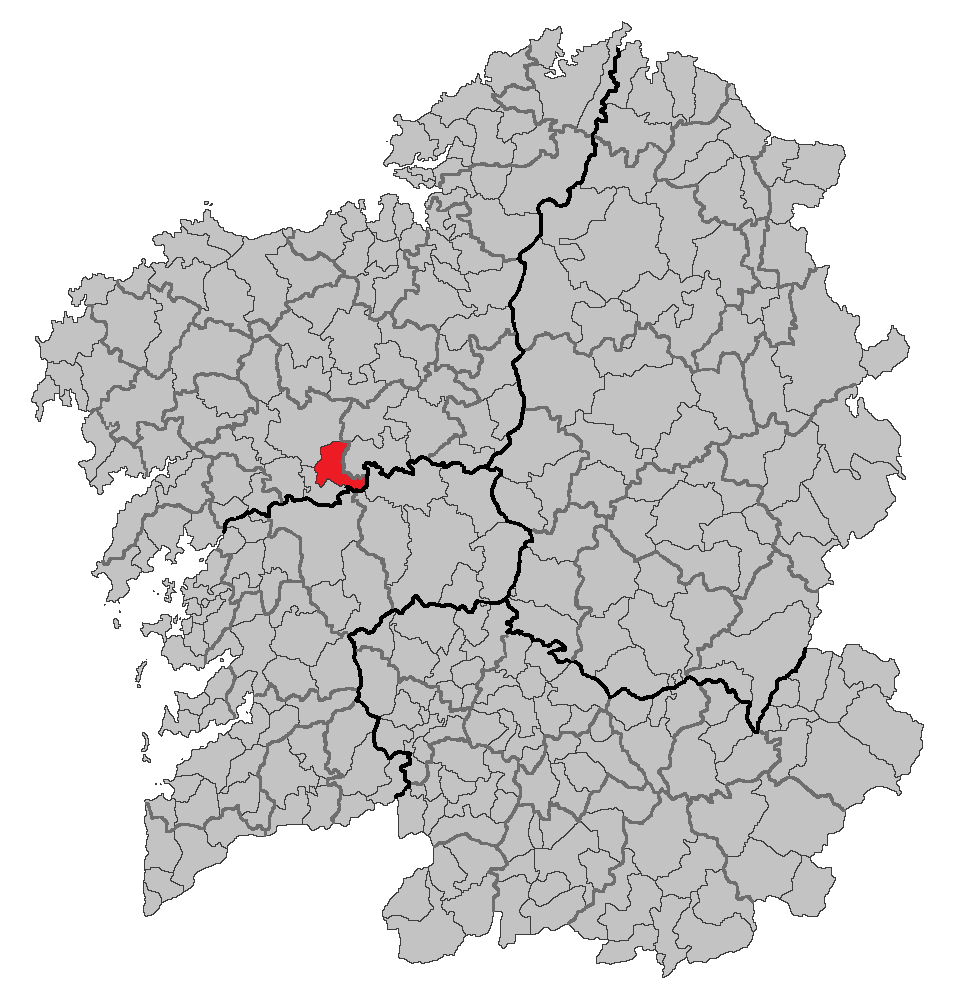
- Location of Boqueixón within Galicia
- Coordinates: 42.817°N 8.417°W
- Country: Spain
- Autonomous community: Galicia
- Province: A Coruña

Population (2025-01-01)
  - Total: 4,219
- Time zone: UTC+1 (CET)
  - Summer (DST): UTC+2 (CEST)

Boqueixón (Galician pronunciation: [bokejˈʃoŋ]) is a municipality in the province of A Coruña, situated in the autonomous community of Galicia (northwestern Spain).It has a population of 4,445 inhabitants (INE, 2008).

== Geography ==
Integrated inside the comarca of Santiago, it is 16 kilometres away from Galicia's capital city, Santiago de Compostela.

Its terrain is composed of a number of valleys and mountains that descend towards the Ulla river, which separates the province of La coruña and Pontevedra.The altitude varies from 532 to 55 metres next to the Ulla river.

== Demographics ==
Its population surpases 4000 people.

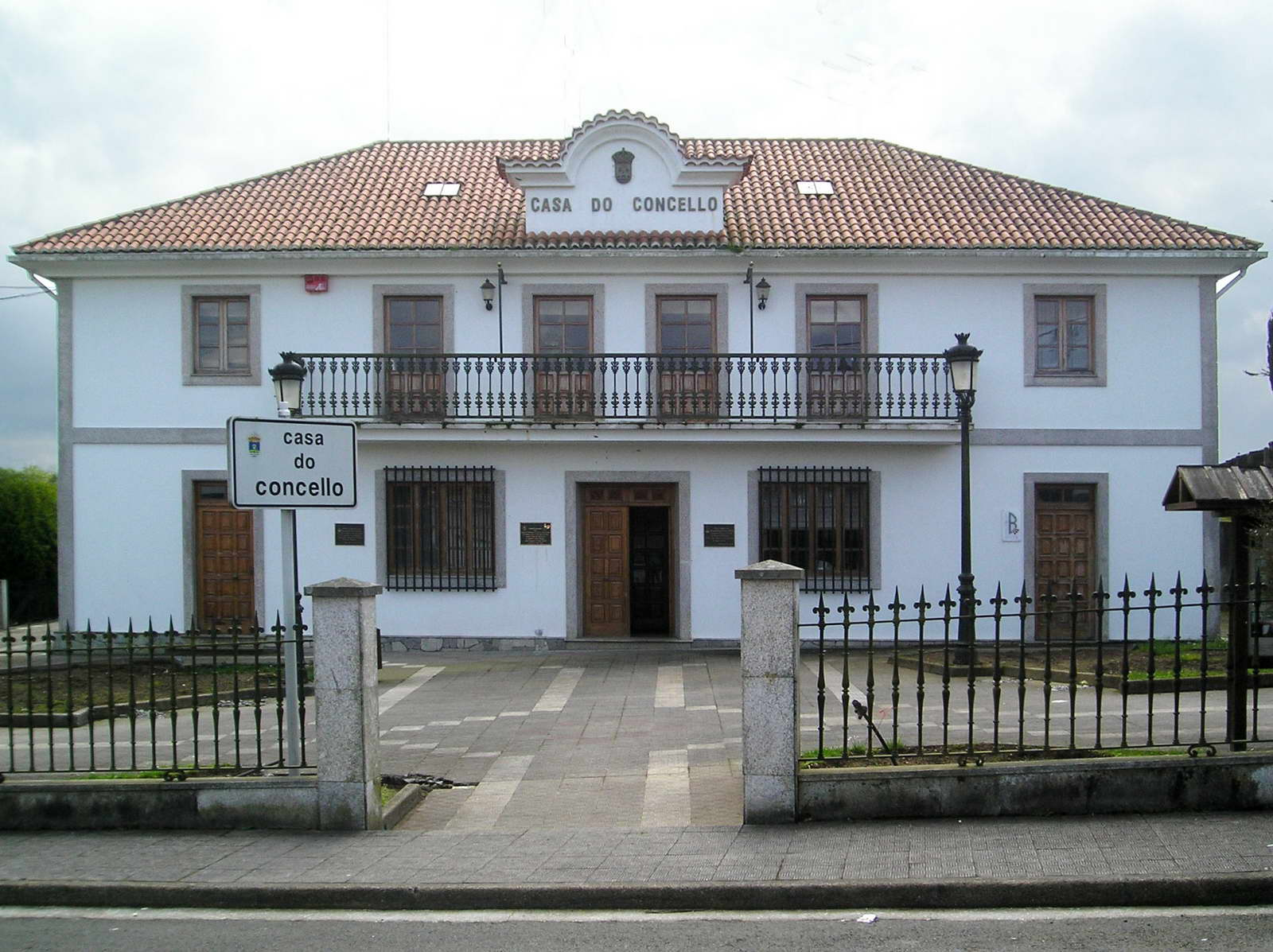
Town Hall.

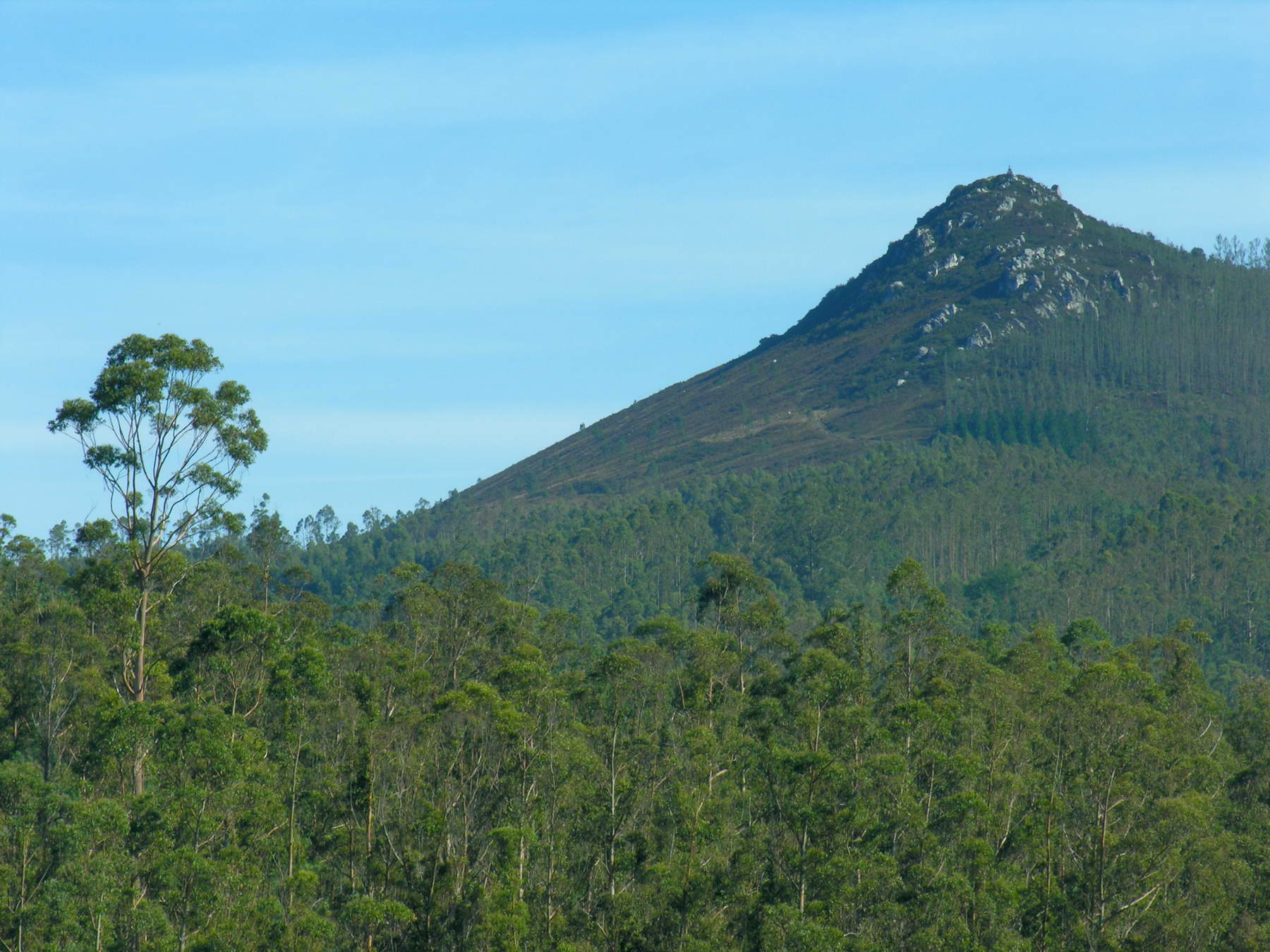
Pico Sacro, Boqueixón.
