= Magh =

Magh may refer to:

- Magha, a month of the Hindu calendar
  - Magh Mela, a Hindu festival celebrated in the month
- Magh (Bengali calendar), the 10th month in the Bengali calendar, last month of the winter season
- Magh (Nepali calendar), the 10th month in the Nepali calendar, approximately mid-January to mid-February and 29 days long
- Magh (Punjabi calendar), a month of the Punjabi calendar
- Magha (poet), ancient Indian Sanskrit writer, author of the epic Shishupala Vadha
- Rakhine, Marma and Barua people, tribal ethnic groups of Myanmar, Bangladesh and India

== See also ==
- Magha (disambiguation)
