= Raíña Lupa Award =

Award for children's and juvenile literature in Galicia, Spain

The Raíña Lupa Award is an award for children's and juvenile literature in the Galician language, awarded by the Culture department of the Provincial Council of A Coruña since 1998.

== Winning works ==
- 1998: Cos pés no aire, by Agustín Fernández Paz
- 1999: Velaí vai o verme, by Mario Pereira
- 2000: Resalgario en Traslicia, by Antonio Reigosa
- 2002: O armiño dorme, by Xosé Antonio Neira Cruz
- 2004: Tonecho de Rebordechao, by Breogán Riveiro
- 2006: Viaxe a Libunca, by Antonio Yáñez Casal
- 2008: A peripecia de Roi, by Carlos López Gómez
- 2010: Centauros do norte, by Marcos Calveiro
- 2012: Reo, by Xesús Fraga
- 2015: Vidas cruzadas, by Héctor Cajaraville
- 2017: A filla do Minotauro, by Marilar Aleixandre
- 2019: O grupo, by An Alfaya
- 2020: O enigma de Santiago, by Xosé Antonio Neira Cruz
- 2021: Que me pare o corazón, by Andrea Maceiras.
- 2022: A tribo do mar, by Lois Pérez Díaz.
- 2023: As pedras verdes, by Rafael Fernández Lorenzo.

== See also ==
- Raíña Lupa
