= Magaly =

Magaly or Magali is a given name.

Magali may refer to:

- Magali Amadei (born 1974), French fashion model
- Magali Babin (born 1967), Canadian musician and composer
- Magalí Benejam, Argentine beauty pageant titleholder
- Magali Febles (born 1964), Dominican beauty pageant director
- Magali Frezzotti, American softball coach
- Magali Harvey (born 1990), Canadian rugby union player
- Magali Le Floc'h (born 1975), French racing cyclist
- Magali de Lattre (born 1987), Portuguese tennis player
- Magali Lunel (born 1970), French television journalist
- Magali Messmer (born 1971), Swiss triathlete
- Magali Cornier Michael, feminist literary scholar
- Magali Noël (1932–2015), French actress and singer
- Magali García Ramis (born 1946), Puerto Rican writer
- Magali Rathier (born 1974), French synchronized swimmer
- Magali Sauri (born 1977), French ice dancer
- Magali Luyten (born 1978), Belgian heavy metal singer
- Magali Tisseyre (born 1981), Canadian triathlete
- Magali Vendeuil (1926–2009), French actress
- Magali Villeneuve (born 1980), French fantasy illustrator
- Maggy (Monica's Gang), the character created by Mauricio de Sousa and called Magali in Portuguese
- Franka Magali (born 1990), Congolese sprinter
- Magali kizhangu, Tamil name for Decalepis hamiltonii

Magaly may refer to:

- Magaly Alabau (born 1945), Cuban poet and theater director
- Magaly Carvajal (born 1968), Cuban volleyball player
- Magaly Medina (born 1963), Peruvian television journalist
- Magaly Ruiz (born 1941), Cuban musician and composer
- Magaly Solier (born 1986), Peruvian actress and recording artist
- Sophie & Magaly, French musical duo
