= Nuberu =

Spanish mythical creatures

The Nuberu, Ñuberu, Reñubeiru or Nubeiru (Asturian, Leonese, Eonavian Cantabrian), Nubero (Castilian) or Nubeiro (Galician) -literally "The Clouder"- is a character of Asturian, Cantabrian, Galician and Leonese mythology. According to Asturian mythology, the Nuberu (also known in Western Asturias as Reñubeiru or Xuan Cabritu) is the divinity of clouds and storms.

In some stories, he is an individual; in others, the Nuberu is a species of dwarf-like beings with the power to control the weather. Sometimes, he is represented as a man with a thick beard, who wears goat leathers and a big hat. Their appearance changes from region to region, but they are usually elderly, winged, dark and terribly ugly. When he is treated as a single entity, Nuberu is said to dress with dark pelts and leather, travel in a chariot pulled by wolves, and wear a patch to cover an injured or missing eye. He, or they, can be terribly cruel to people, damaging fields and pastures, although he can also be very kind to those who had helped him before. The myth tells us that he lives in the city of Orito, in Egypt. Folklorists think that Nuberu is an Asturian remnant of the ancient god Taranis, who also ruled over the skies and was worshipped in Asturias until the Middle Ages. Other folklorists connect Nuberu with either Thor or Donar, or even Odin, since both of them are cunning and lack an eye. Other folklorists, such as Aurelio del Llano, defend the Phoenician origins of this tradition.

Within Spain, their closest parallel is the Entiznáu from Extremadura, another evil weather creature with dark appearance and power over storms, who shares description and clothing with Nuberu, but differs in size.

== Asturian tradition ==
In Asturias, he is usually thought of as a single magical entity that receives various names. A long time ago the Nuberu came to Asturias riding a cloud, but he was very unlucky and fell to the ground: then he asked for shelter but nobody wanted to help him until, late at night, a peasant took pity on him. In appreciation for his help, Nuberu irrigated his fields, and gave him good harvests, and has continued to provide rain to the people of the region. The story tells that some years later this peasant had to make a long journey to Egypt, and when he arrived in that land he heard that his wife was about to marry another man, thinking that her husband, after so many years of absence, already had died. The peasant then asked Nuberu for help and together they travel back to Asturias riding the clouds and they arrive in time to prevent the wedding. In Asturian villages it is common to ring the bells in order to exorcize Nuberu.

The Nuberu controls the weather at will and amuses himself triggering storms and gales, striking animals with streaks of lightning and ruining the harvests of men with hail. He will not hesitate to use lightning as a weapon if he is attacked or bothered. Among the people of Cantabria and Asturias, he is feared for the damage he causes in villages. Nights of rainfall and storms are attributed to him. For this reason during the dark hours, locals light up candles and ring bells to scare him away. Fishermen fear the Nuberu because they blame him for the strong north-western winds of the Cantabrian Sea, which forces them to return hurriedly to port, where worried people await them.

== Cantabrian tradition ==
In Cantabrian mythology, the Nuberus are often a multitude of little creatures, not a single one. They are described as small, chubby and mischievous, with devilish grins in their demonic faces and little black wings. They aren't as evil as the Asturian Nuberu, but are still powerful and inconsiderate, and take great joy in causing misery and destroying the property of humans. They are blamed of the fierce, rainy storms that unleash during the night and break the roof of houses. Traditionally, villagers used to light on candles and make bells ring as loudly as possible during cloudy evenings, to scare the little demons off. However, the Cantabrians who fear the Nuberus the most are not house owners but sailors, who blame them for the terrible and unpredictable galernas (sudden storms) of the Cantabrian Sea.

== Galician tradition ==
In Southern Galicia, Nubeiros have the appearance of small hairy men with a long and twisted tail. They fly on grey clouds and cause dry summer storms, lightning, and similar disasters. Galician Nuberus are also scared of bells and can sometimes be scared through their sound, or through the counter-enchantment of a priest. In other parts of Galicia the Nubeiro is one big man covered in wolf or goat skins, and associated with storms, lighting, fog, and to a lesser extent, to avalanches. Nuberu forges lightning by himself in his iron workshop in the mountains, and when he has made enough he goes out and rides through the sky to cause storms and throw his creations around. He is missing one eye, so his aim is less than perfect. This version of Nuberu goes down to Earth sometimes, dressed as a traveller, to observe his handywork, or to ask around when he accidentally loses a cloud. It is the version that most closely resembles Nordic deities.

== Leonese tradition ==
Due to its condition of frontier land, Leonese myths are particularly eclectic and resemble those of the region they border closest to, creating a mix of the aforementioned narratives with heavy elements of the Entiznau of Extremadura. Leonese people don't consider Nuberos as evil as the other regions do, and tend to welcome the rain they bring during the fall, but they blame their most evil aspects of lightning and fires caused by summer storms. To prevent the disasters these creatures cause, tradition recommends burning dry grass in the right seasons to make sure that the little demons have no target to hit. (For more information on this, check Transhumance in Spain.

== Nuberu images ==
In the mists
With a big hat
In the mountain
