= Galician mythology =

Stories that are part of the culture of the Galician people

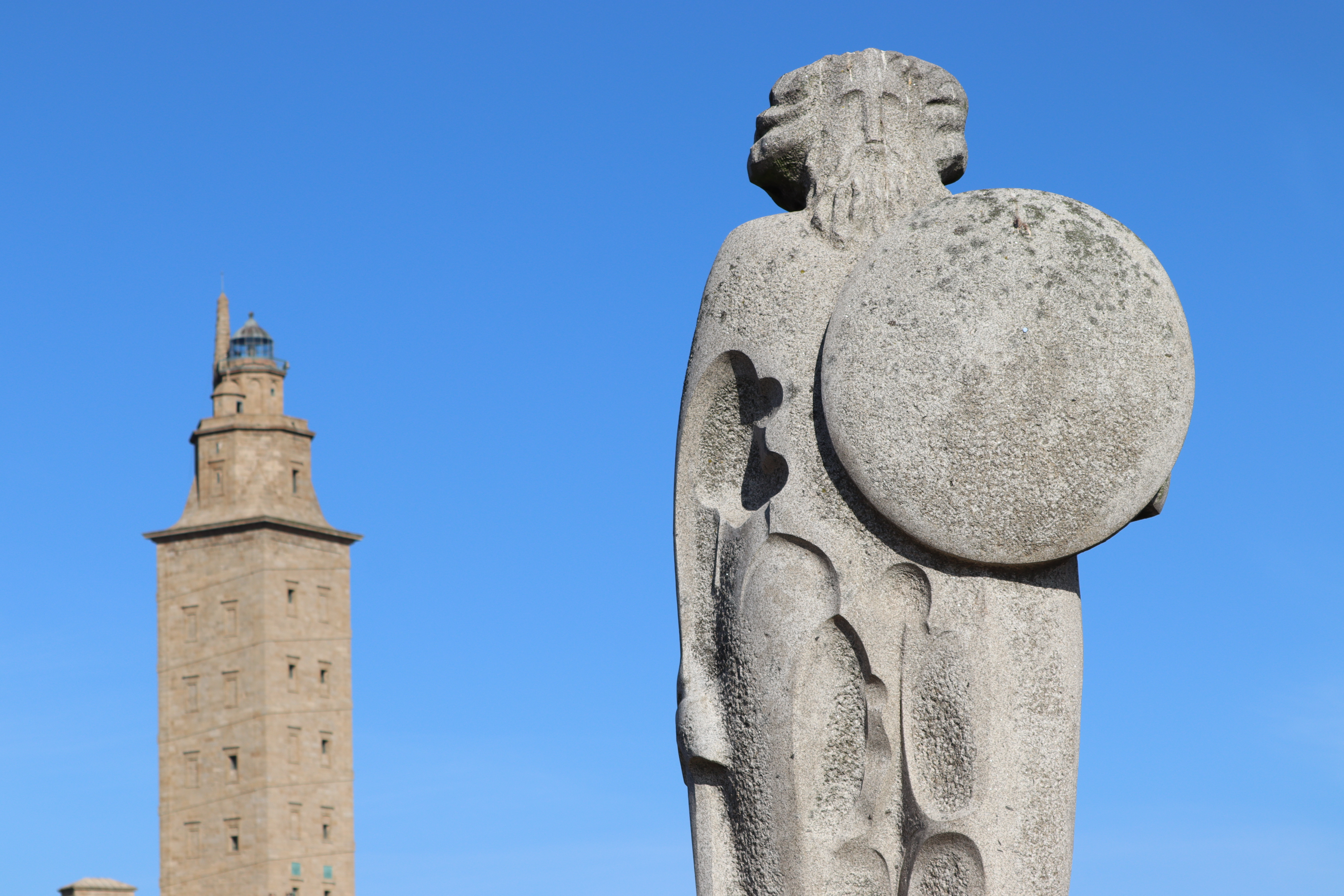
Breogán statue in A Coruña, with the Tower of Hercules in the background.

Galician mythology comprises a collection of related and unrelated myths forming part of the traditional culture of the Galician people. Legend identifies Breogán, a mythical Celtic king, as the founder of the Galician nation. The Tower of Hercules in A Coruña, a Roman lighthouse, is associated with a legend where the hero Hercules slew the giant Geryon and buried his head beneath the tower. Prominent mythological figures include the Mouros, often associated with ancient megalithic structures like dolmens and hillforts and depicted as guardians of hidden treasures or wielders of magical powers, and the Meigas (witches). The Santa Compaña, a procession of the dead, also features prominently. These mythological themes, rooted in oral tradition and influenced by ancient inhabitants of the region, influence Galician culture, appearing in folklore, literature, and music.

== Background ==
Galician mythology has strong ties to Celtic culture, which spread across the Atlantic regions of Europe, including parts of northern Spain. The ancient Celtic Gallaeci tribe inhabited Galicia as early as the 1st millennium BCE, establishing cultural practices that resonate with other Celtic societies in Ireland, Scotland, and Brittany. Central to these Celtic influences was the veneration of nature and a belief in spirits that inhabit the natural world, especially rivers, mountains, and forests. The Celts in Galicia are thought to have worshiped deities associated with these natural elements, practiced rituals tied to the agricultural cycle, and held a profound respect for animal symbolism, all of which are key themes in Galician mythology.

With the Roman conquest in the 1st century BCE, many of Galicia’s original religious practices began to merge with Roman beliefs. The Romans introduced their pantheon, adapting Galician deities into Roman counterparts and building temples and altars dedicated to both Roman and local gods. However, the Galicians maintained many of their indigenous traditions and stories, leading to a unique fusion of Roman and Celtic elements. The persistence of animistic beliefs—spirits connected to the natural world, stones, rivers, and ancient structures—is a legacy of this blend.

As Christianity spread throughout Galicia in the early Middle Ages, many of the region’s pre-Christian beliefs were incorporated into Christian practices. Pagan deities and spirits were reinterpreted as saints or demonic figures, and traditional festivals were adapted to align with the Christian calendar. For example, festivals such as Samaín, the Celtic harvest festival, transformed into All Saints’ Day but retained its connections to the spirit world and the remembrance of ancestors. Witches, or Meigas, also evolved during this period, often blending roles as both village healers and suspected agents of evil in Christian eyes. This syncretism between pagan beliefs and Christianity contributed to the survival of many Galician myths.

== Mythical beings ==
=== Mouros and Mouras ===
Mouros and Mouras are magical, enigmatic spirits tied to the earth. These figures are associated with the ruins of dolmens, pazos, hill forts, and other megalithic sites across Galicia, often linked to the pre-Roman past. Mouros, typically depicted as male, and Mouras, as female, are known for their beauty, wisdom, and connection to underground treasures. The Mouras, in particular, are often portrayed as enchanting maidens who guard hidden riches and appear near wells, rivers, or caves. They are said to weave, spin, or comb their golden hair, occasionally offering gifts or granting wishes to those who help or free them from enchantments.

=== Santa Compaña ===
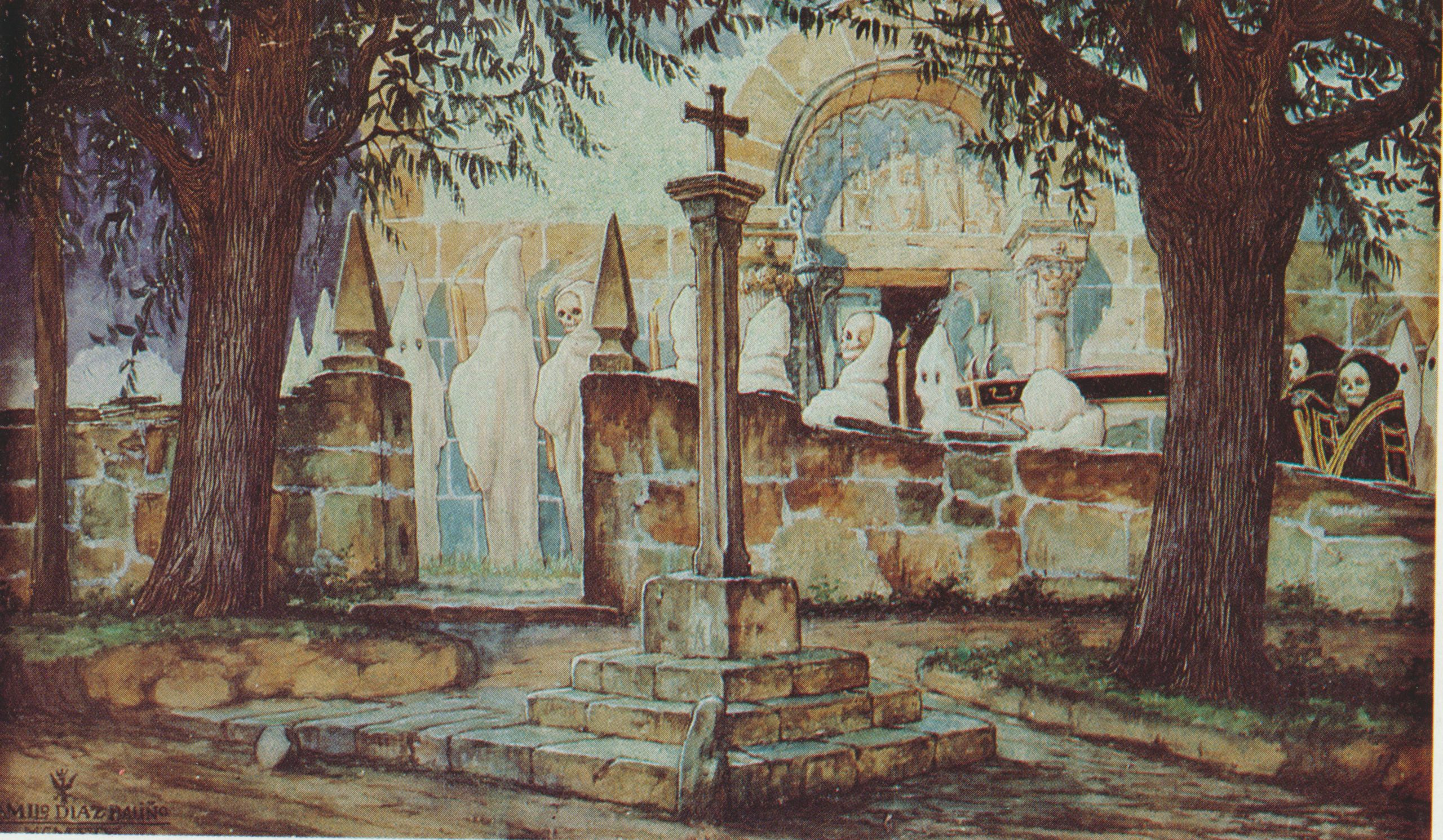
Watercolour painting of Santa Compaña and a cruceiro, by Camilo Díaz Baliño.

This spectral procession is said to be composed of the spirits of the dead, cloaked in robes, silently wandering the countryside at night. The eerie parade is led by a living person carrying a cross and a cauldron of holy water, who is cursed to walk until another unfortunate soul takes their place. The Santa Compaña is often seen as a harbinger of death or misfortune, visiting homes where someone is soon to die. Those who witness the procession are advised not to look directly at it or cross its path, lest they fall under its curse. To avoid being chosen as the procession's leader or to protect oneself from its effects, Galicians have traditionally used protective charms or prayers. A cruceiro (calvary) is believed to offer protection against the Santa Compaña as well. These roadside crosses, commonly found at intersections or paths, are sacred markers where the living can seek refuge from supernatural entities.

=== Meigas ===
Galician mythology includes beliefs in witches, known as meigas, who are thought to possess magical powers. In Galician culture, the meigas can either be malevolent or benevolent, serving as both healers and sorceresses. The tradition of the meigas is deeply rooted in rural life, where they were often called upon for folk remedies, blessings, or curses. The phrase “Habelas hainas,” meaning “They exist, they do,” reflects the belief in the presence of witches despite skepticism from some.

=== Animais de Poder ===
Animals seen as spiritual or symbolic, such as wolves, crows, owls, and stag beetles, which are believed to act as guides or omens. They are often connected to both life and death, conveying wisdom or warnings to those who encounter them.

== List of other mythical beings ==
Individuals belonging to "mythical races"

- Giants
- Olláparo
- Dwarves
- Carcamáns
- Xente cativa
- Codíns
- Mermaids (Xacia)
- Mouros
- Moura
- Xerpas
- Rabenos
- Encanto
- Tesouro
- Lamia
- Les Lavandières
- Trasgu
- Diaños
- Tardo

Entities that personify some quality or human condition

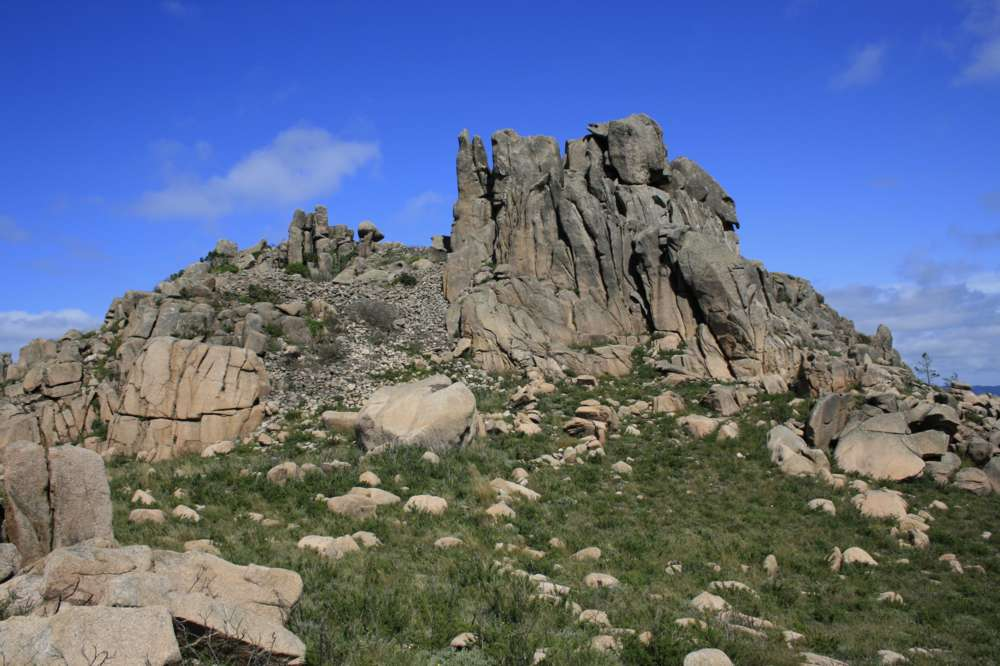
Remains of the mythical Castle of Saint George, on Mount Pindo, the "Celtic Mount Olympus"

- Pedro Chosco (The Galician version of Wee Willie Winkie)
- Death
- Holy Company (Galician: A Estadea)

Mythological people

- Queen Lupa
- Ana Manama
- Blanchefleur (Galician: Brancaflor)
- María Castaña
- Orcavella
- Pepa a Loba

Humans with supernatural powers

- Baluros
- Bandoleiros
- Corredores
- Werewolves
- Witches
- Meiga chuchona
- Nuberu
- Sabias
- Vedoiros

Demons, angels, and saints

- Breogán
- Hercules
- Noah
- Teucer

Magical plants and creatures

- Scorpions
- Cobras
- weasels
- Crickets
- Wolves
- Lizards
- Beetles
- Basilisks
- Coco
- Dragons
- Unicorns
- Oak trees
- sea thrift
- bay laurel

== Gallery ==
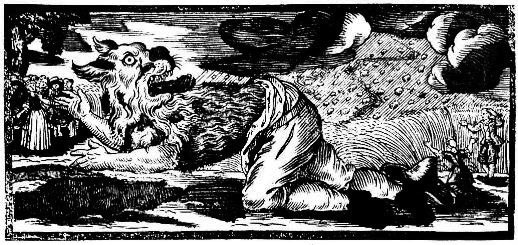
German representation of a werewolf, from 1722

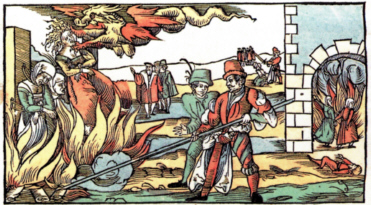
Witch burning

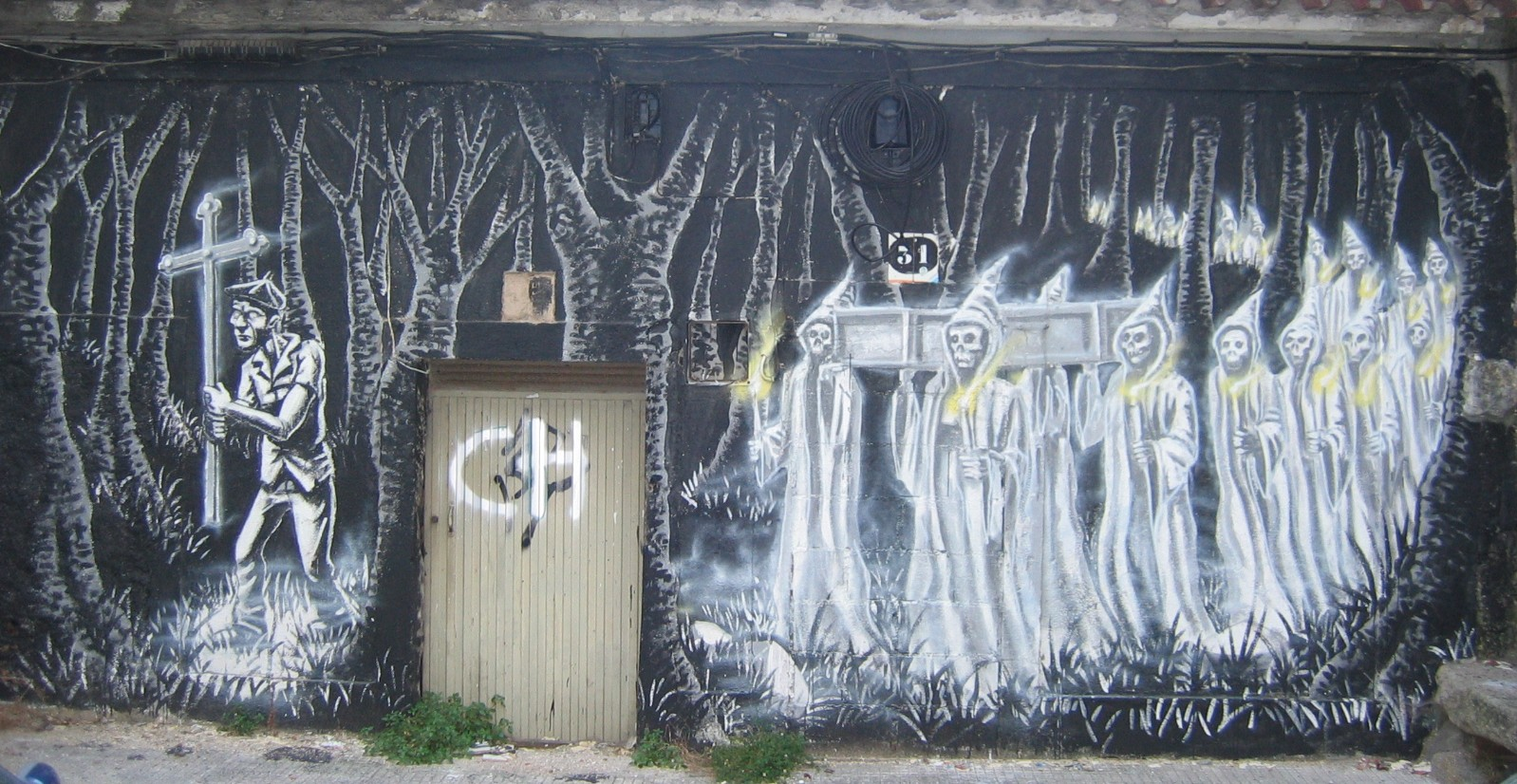
Representation of the Holy Company in Pontevedra

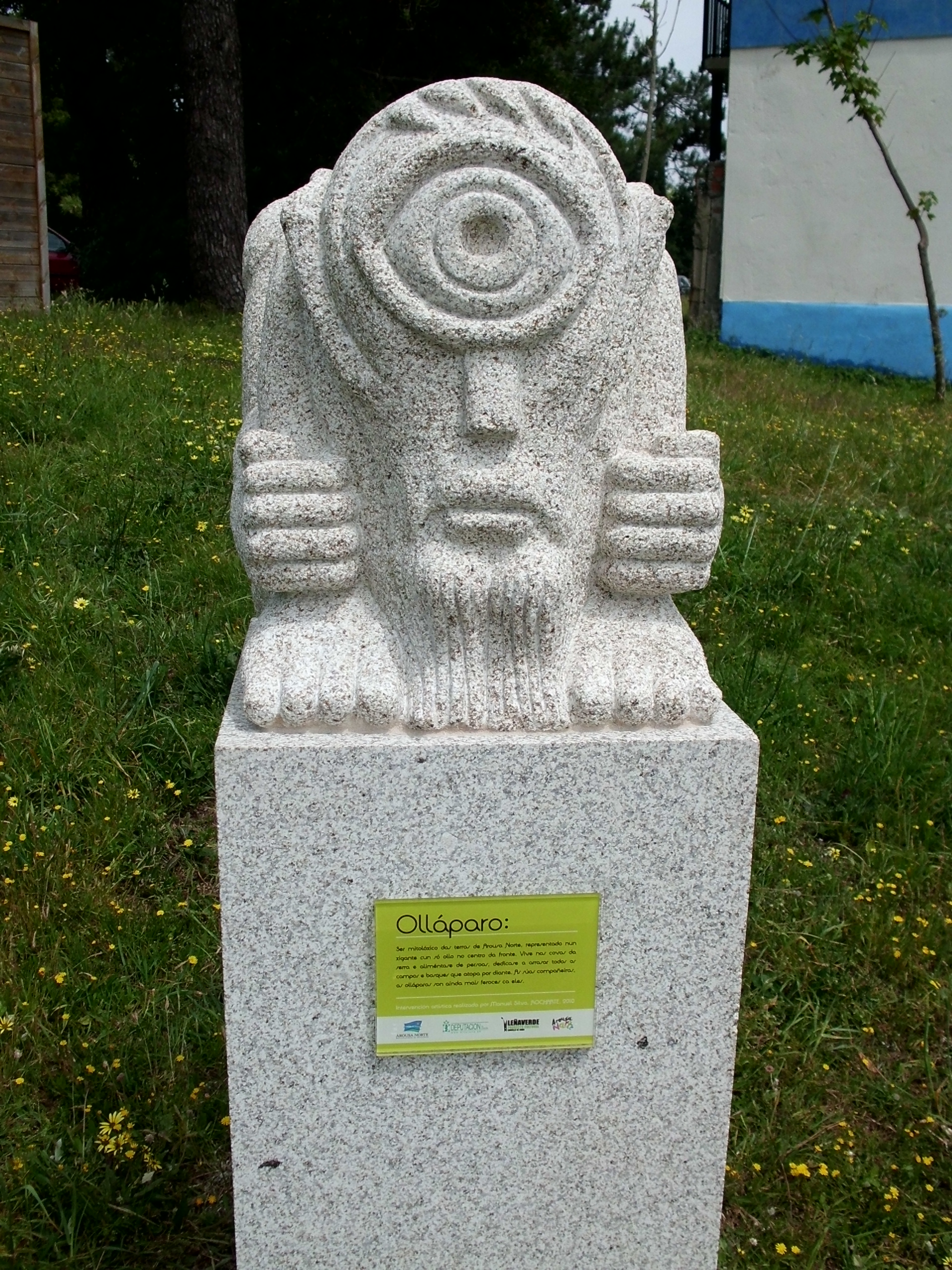
Olláparo sculpture, on the Barraña beach promenade, Boiro

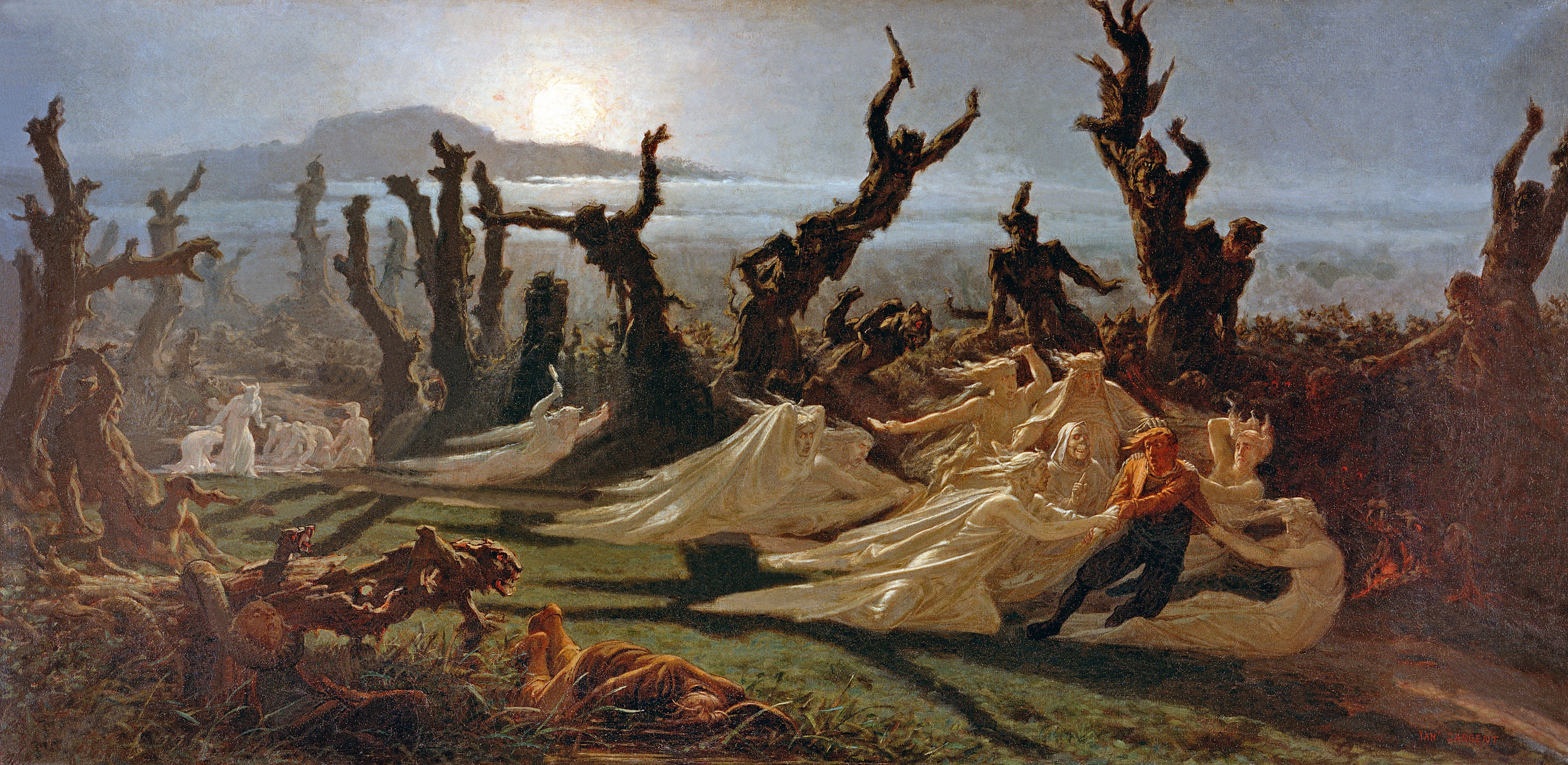
Midnight Washerwomen, painting by the Breton painter Yan' Dargent.

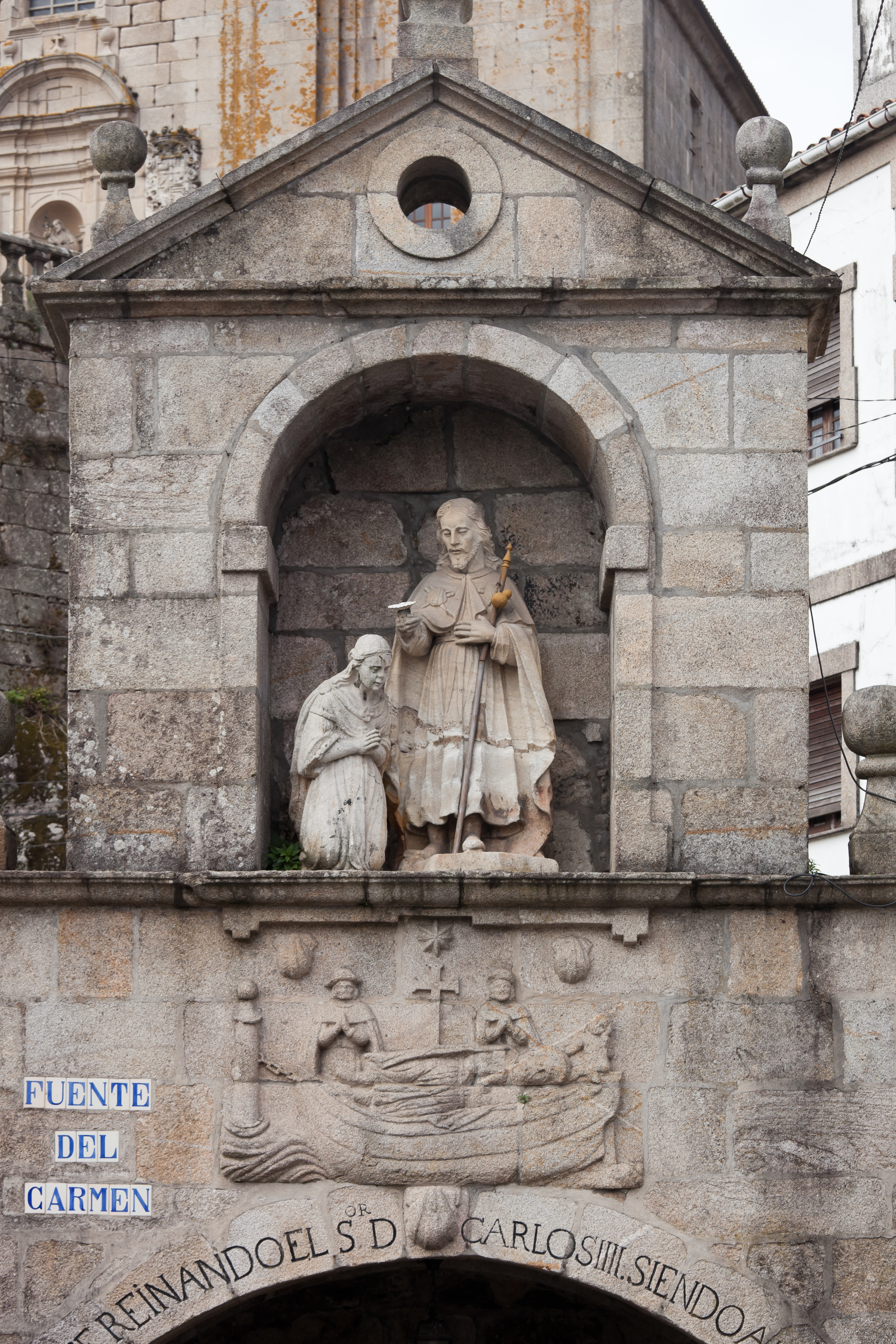
Baptism of Queen Lupa by Saint James. Fonte do Carmen, Padrón.

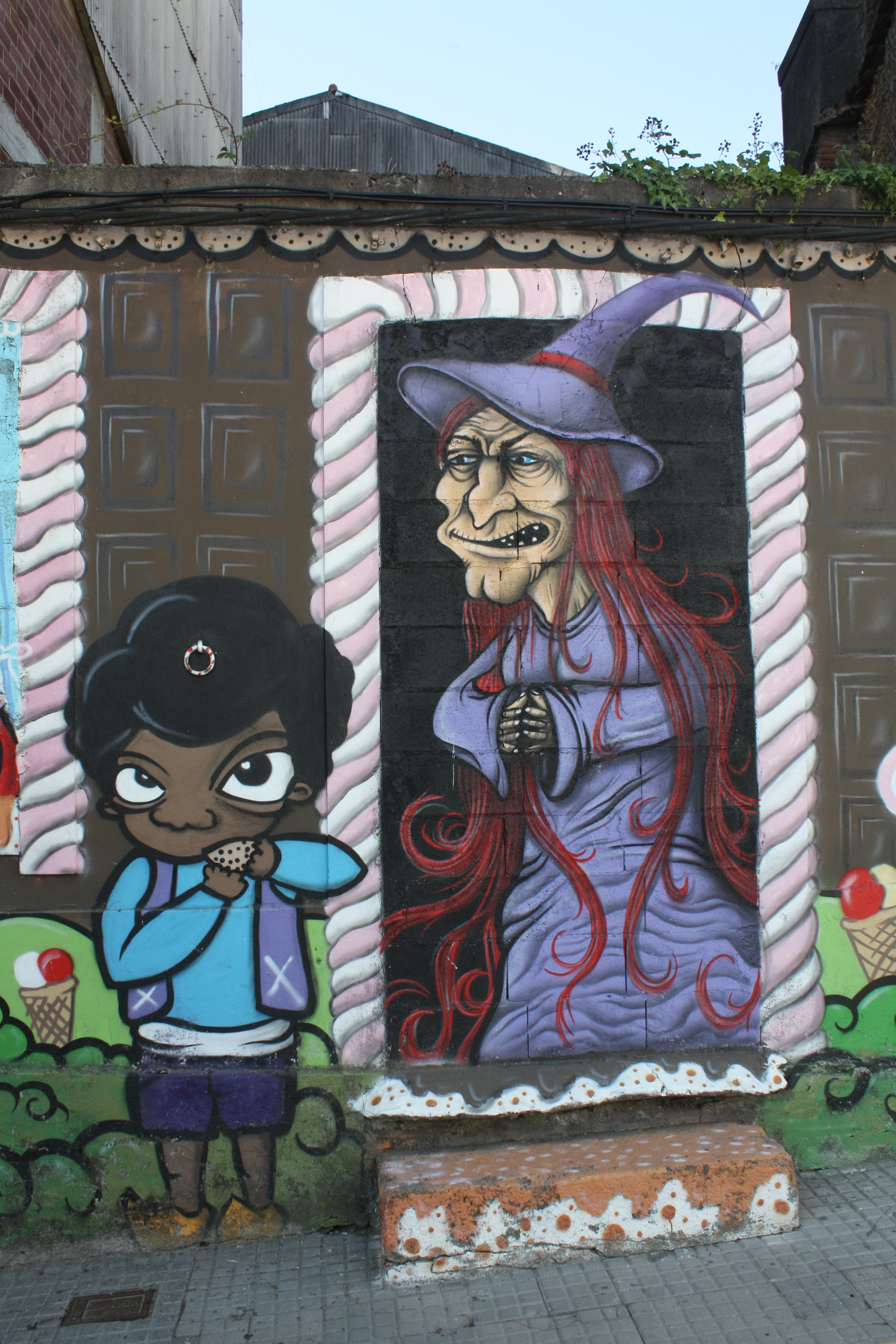
Graffiti of a witch in Ordes

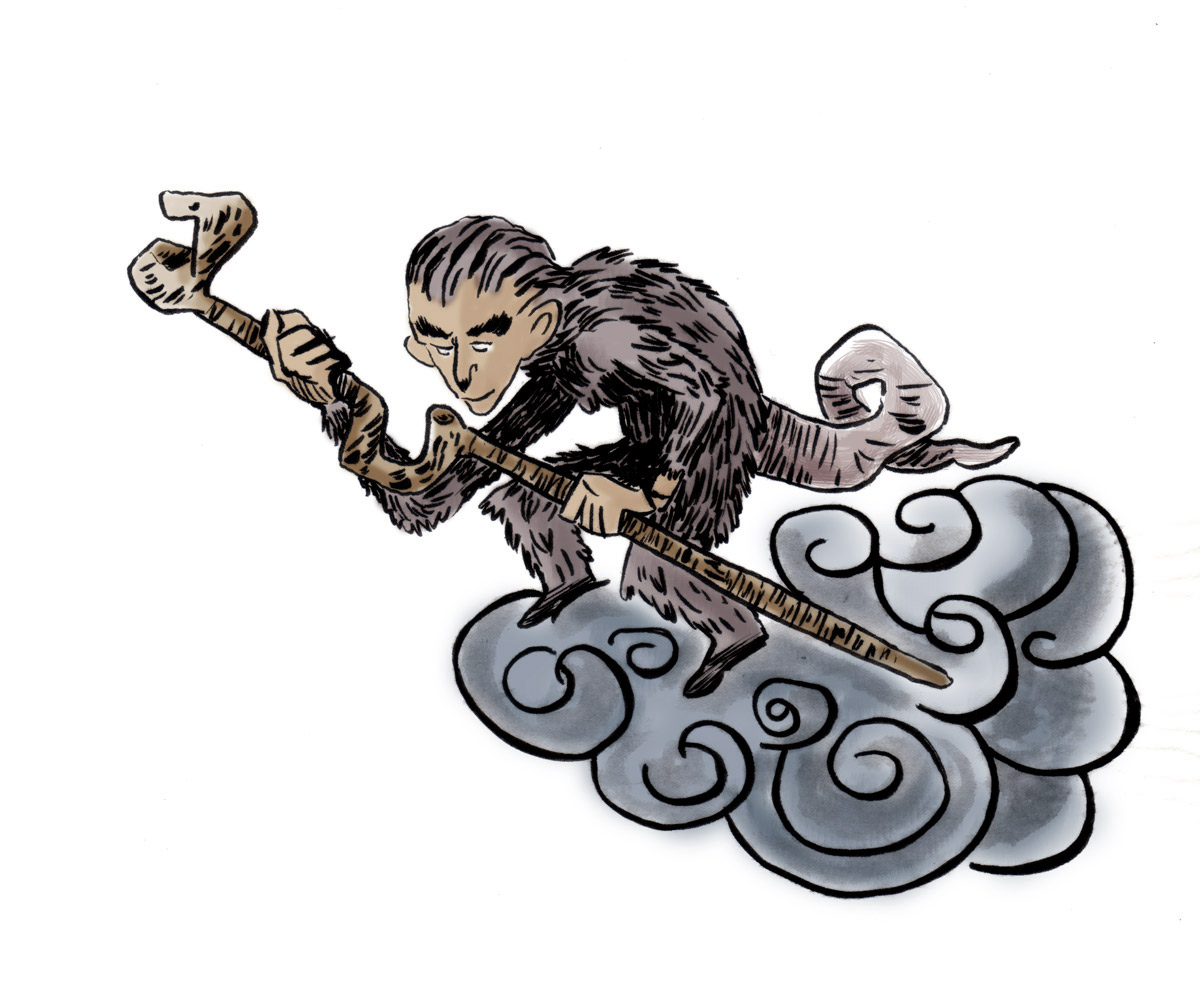
An interpretation of a Nuberu

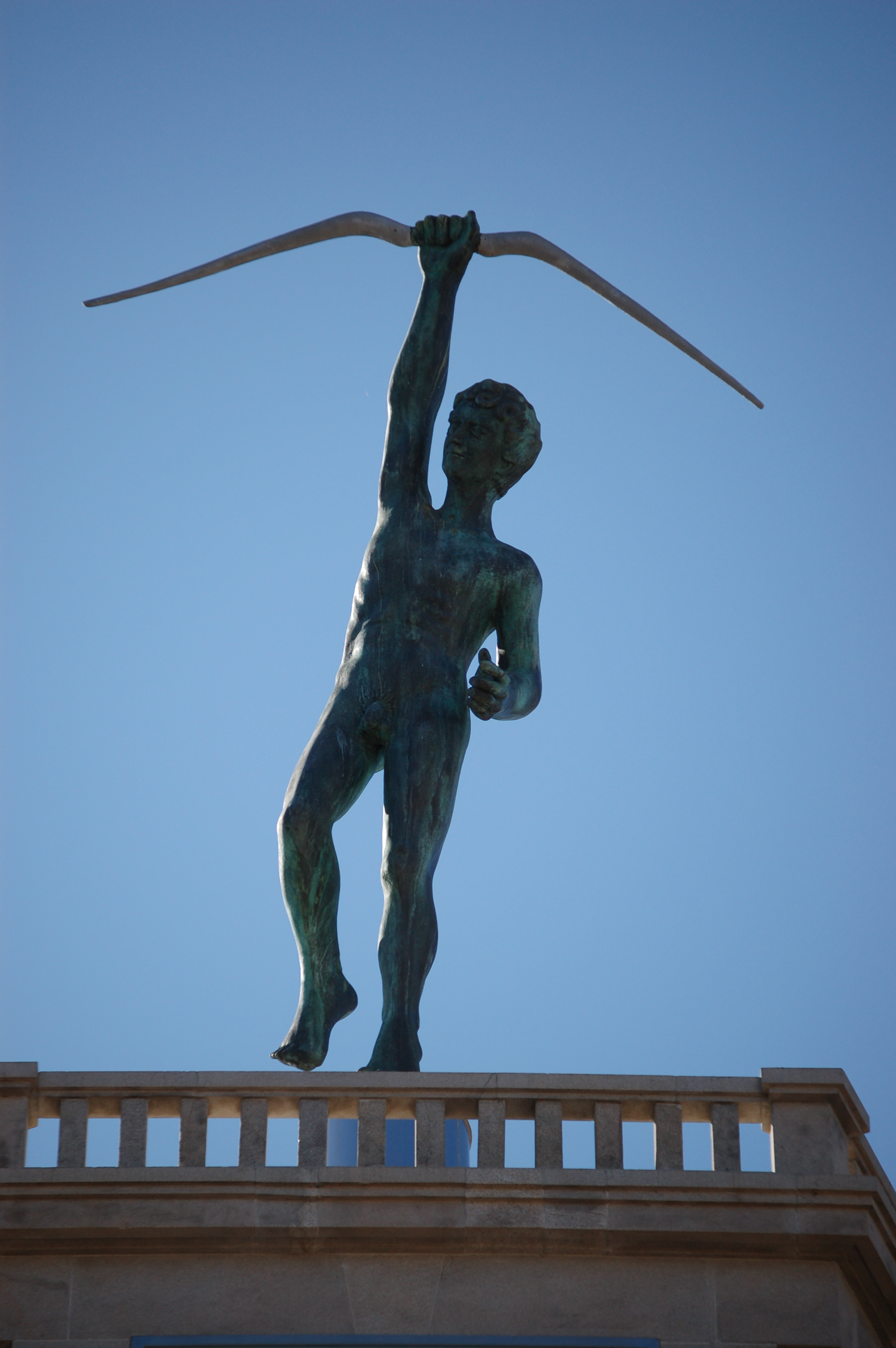
Statue of Teucer in Pontevedra

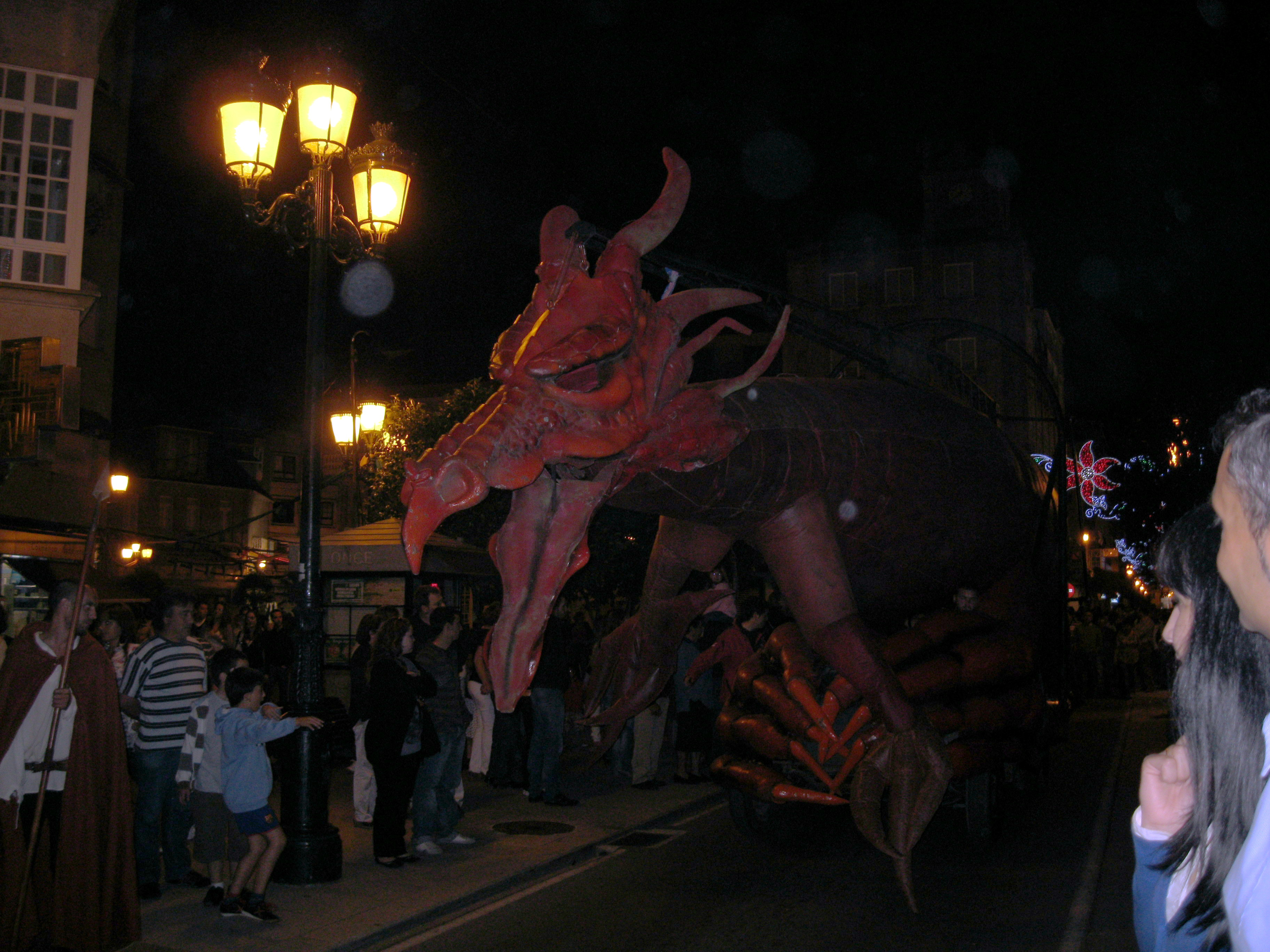
Coco through the streets of Redondela at the Festival of Coco in Redondela

== See also ==
- Hermitage of Our Lady of Lanzadagl
- Thunderstone
- Irish mythology
- Asturian mythology
- Tarasque

== Bibliography ==
- Cuba, Xoán Ramiro [in Galician]; Reigosa, Antonio [in Galician]; Miranda, Xosé [in Galician] (1999). Pequena mitoloxía de Galicia. Illustrated by Lázaro Enríquez. Edicións Xerais de Galicia. ISBN 84-8302-363-6.
- Cuba, Xoán Ramiro [in Galician]; Reigosa, Antonio [in Galician]; Miranda, Xosé [in Galician] (2001). Dicionario dos seres míticos galegos. Edicións Xerais de Galici. ISBN 978-84-8302-705-9.
- Reigosa, Antonio [in Galician] (2000). Guía de campo da Galicia Encantada. Dos seres míticos e dos lugares que habitan. Illustrated by Noemí López. Xerais. ISBN 978-84-9121-646-9.
- Reigosa, Antonio [in Galician]; Brochs, Neira (2020). Cen historias máxicas pola Mariña encantada. Viveiro: Libros LAR. ISBN 978-84-9493-086-7.
- Reigosa, Antonio [in Galician] (2020). Contrahistorias de Galicia. Edicións Embora. ISBN 978-84-1782-427-3.
