= History of Galicia =

The Iberian Peninsula, where Galicia is located, has been inhabited for at least 500,000 years, first by Neanderthals and then by modern humans. From about 4500 BC, it (like much of the north and west of the peninsula) was inhabited by a megalithic culture, which entered the Bronze Age about 1500 BC. These people would become the Gallaeci (a group of Celtic tribes), and they would be conquered by the Roman Empire in the first and second centuries AD. As the Roman Empire declined, Galicia would be conquered and ruled by various Germanic tribes, notably the Suebi and Visigoths, until the 9th century. Then the Muslim conquest of Iberia reached Galicia, although they never quite controlled the area.

In the 9th century, remains were found that were believed to be Saint James, the apostle who had brought Christianity to Spain in the first century, and the church Santiago de Compostela was built to honor these relics. This church would become one of the most important Christian pilgrimage destinations in the world.

Intermittent war, especially between Christians and Muslims, was a regular part of the Middle Ages in Galicia, as the Reconquista (Christians gradually defeating Muslim kingdoms in Spain) would last until the 15th century. During this time, Galicia was sometimes an independent kingdom, and sometimes part of or united with kingdoms such as Asturias, León, or Portugal. The kingdom of Spain was formed at the end of the 15th century by the union of Castile (of which Galicia was then a part) and Aragon.

Political and cultural sentiments during the 19th century increased support for the idea of Galicia having a separate identity from the rest of Spain. The Second Spanish Republic allowed Galicia to have an official status of autonomy during the 1930s. After the Spanish Civil War, however, the regime of Francisco Franco removed this autonomy, and generally suppressed local cultural identities throughout Spain in favor of a single Spanish national identity. When Spain transitioned to democracy following Franco's death in 1975, Galicia was allowed autonomy again, and there have been efforts since then to preserve Galician heritage and culture.

== Prehistory ==
=== Megalithic culture ===
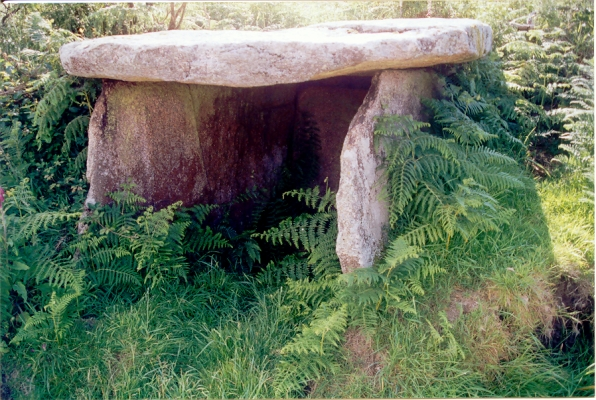
Casota de Freán, at Berdoias, Vimianzo.

Galicia, northern Portugal, Asturias, western León, and Zamora formed a single megalithic area since the Neolithic and Chalcolithic Ages (also called the Copper Age), around 4500–1500 BC.

This was the first great culture to appear in Galicia, with a great capacity for construction and architecture. This was combined with a deep sense of religion, based on the cult of the dead, the mediators between man and the gods.

From this era there remain thousands of dolmens (mámoas), a type of tomb or sepulchre, throughout the entire territory. From its social organization it has been confirmed that it corresponded to some type of clan structure.

=== Bronze Age ===
The introduction of bronze-working techniques introduced a new cultural era, in which the new importance of metals resulted in intense mining activity.

Peoples from the Castilian plateau moved to Galicia, thus increasing the population, because its position near the Atlantic Ocean gave it a very humid climate.

The increase in population caused certain conflicts, but also led to increased mining and production of weapons, useful objects, and ornamental objects of gold and bronze. Pieces of jewellery crafted from Galician metals circulated throughout the Iberian Peninsula and the rest of Europe.

== Antiquity ==
=== The Gallaeci (Celts) ===
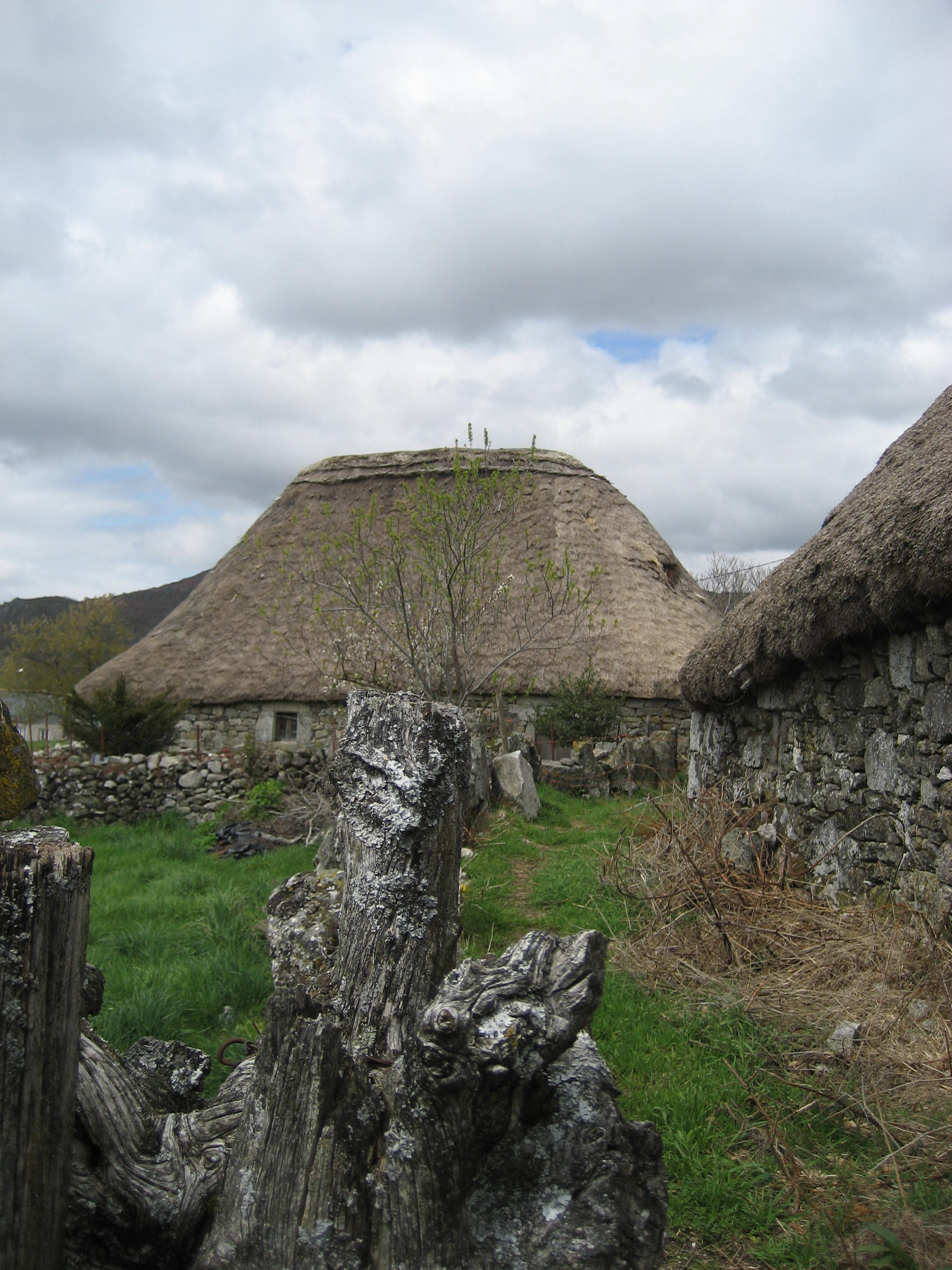
The Palloza, a Galician house type still present in the eastern mountains of Galicia, was from the Iron Age until the Middle Ages common to the whole of Galicia.

At the end of the Iron Age, people from northwestern Iberian Peninsula formed a homogeneous and distinct cultural group, which was later identified by early Greek and Latin authors, who called them "Gallaeci" (Galicians), perhaps due to their apparent similarity with the Galli (Gauls) and Gallati (Galatians). The name of Galicia derives from the name of this tribal complex.

The Gallaeci were originally a Celtic people who for centuries had occupied the territory of modern Galicia and northern Portugal; bounded to the south by the Lusitanians and to the east by the Astures. The Gallaecians lived in fortified villages now called castros (Latin: castra): (hillforts), ranging from small villages of less than a hectare (more common in the north), to great hillforts with more than 10 hectares, named "Oppida" or "Citânia", which were more common in the southern half of the traditional settlement area.

This mode of inhabiting the territory – in hillforts – was common throughout Europe during the Bronze and Iron Ages, having received in the northwest of the Iberian Peninsula the name of "culture of hillforts" or "Castro Culture", what refers to this type of cultural manifestation before the arrival of the Roman Empire. However, even after the Romans' fall, the Gallaeci-Romans continued living in hillforts until the 8th century A.D. In the territory of actual Galicia alone, there exist more than two thousand hillforts, which shows the greatest dispersion of population from the Iron Age in Europe. This would be the origin of the Galician occupation of the territory inherited until nowadays, characterized by small and high numerous populations so distant from each other.

The Gallaeci's political organization was based on small independent states formed by a large number of hillforts; these states were headed by a local king whom the Romans called princeps, as in other parts of Europe. Each Gallaecian identified himself as a member of the hillfort where he lived, as well as the state / people to whom it belonged, and which the Romans called Populus. Among the Galleci there were many named tribes: the Artabri, the Bracari, the Coelerni, the Grovii, the Nemetati, etc. In the same way, at the end of the 18th century, Galicians identified themselves with their parish and their county.

In religious terms, the Gallaeci showed a Celtic religion based on the cult to pan-Celtic gods as Bormanus, Coventina and Lugus; also Bandua, Cossus, Endovelicus, Reue, etc.

=== Roman Gallaecia (19 BC – 410 AD) ===
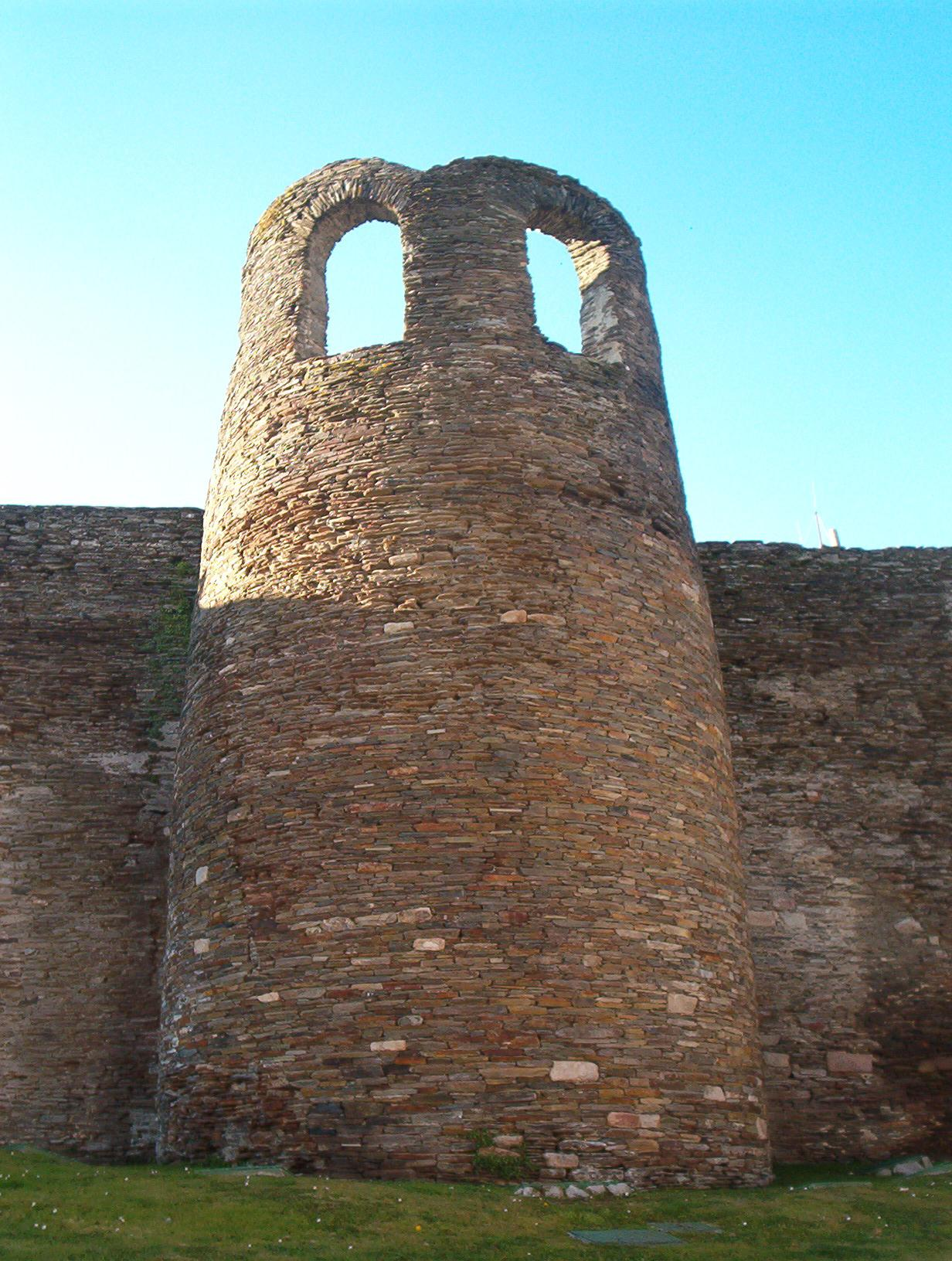
Roman Wall of Lugo (Galicia).

The knowledge that we have today about the society of the hillforts is very limited; according to the Roman historians, the Galicians were a collection of barbarians who spent the day fighting and the night eating, drinking and dancing to the moon. But today it appears that in the last five centuries BC they developed an aristocratic and even perhaps a feudal social model. The division of the country into concelhos, a concept similar to the counties of the islands or Romania, seems to be based on this class of social organization. Also, the structure based on hillforts seems to be associated with a fortified occupation of the territory, resembling the Central European classic Celtic habitat. On the other hand, this kind of territorial occupation was likely associated with its mineral resources (like a gold rush). It is also clear that the Romans' interest in this region was mainly related to its gold mines.

When Iberia was involved in the Punic Wars between the Carthaginians and the Romans, the strategic alliance that they maintained with the Phoenicians enabled Hannibal to recruit many Gallegans. When the Romans finally undertook the conquest of Iberia, the Gallaicoi faced them in 137 BC. in the battle at the river Douro that resulted in a great Roman victory against 60,000 Galicians; the Roman general, proconsul Decimus Iunius Brutus, returned to Rome as a hero, receiving the additional name of Gallaicus, according to the historian Paulus Orosius.

At the end of Brutus' campaigns, Rome controlled the territory between the Douro and Minho rivers plus probable extensions along the coast and in the interior. The Second Invasion, of 61 BC, landed at Brigantium (A Coruña), under the command of Julius Caesar.

The evidence suggests that the resistance of the Gaedels against the Romans ended here; from now on, they would be enlisted massively as auxiliaries of the Roman legions, fulfilling destinies sometimes completely separate from Galicia, as far as Thrace and Dacia. It has been estimated that of the total of Roman auxiliary troops coming from Iberia, more than a third belonged to tribes of the peninsular northwest.

The final extinction of Celtic resistance was the aim of the violent and ruthless Cantabrian Wars fought under the emperor Octavian from 26 to 19 BC. The resistance was appalling: collective suicide rather than surrender, mothers who killed their children before committing suicide, crucified prisoners of war who sang triumphant hymns, rebellions of captives who killed their guards and returned home from Gaul.

In the 3rd century, Diocletian created an administrative division which included the conventūs (plural of conventus) of Gallaecia, Asturica and perhaps Cluniense. This province took the name of Gallaecia since Gallaecia was the most populous and important zone within the province. In 409, as Roman control collapsed, the conquests by the Suebi transformed Roman Gallaecia (conventūs Lucense and Bracarense) into the kingdom of Gallaecia (the Galliciense Regnum recorded by Hydatius and Gregory of Tours).

== Medieval Galicia ==
=== Suebic Kingdom of Galicia (410–585) ===
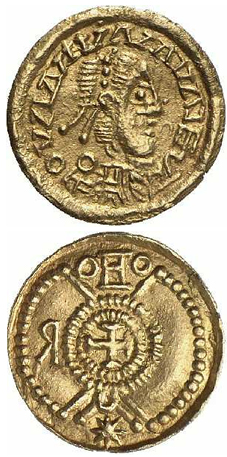
Golden Suevic coin made between years 410 and 500.

In the year 411, Galicia fell to the Suebi, who formed a kingdom of their own.

The number of the original Suebic invaders is estimated as fewer than 30,000 people, settled mainly in the urbanized zones of Braga (Bracara Augusta), Porto, Lugo (Lucus Augusta) and Astorga (Asturica Augusta). Bracara Augusta, the modern city of Braga, became the capital of the Suebi, as it was previously the capital of the Gallaecia Roman province. Suebic Gallaecia was larger than the modern region: it extended south to the river Douro and to Ávila in the east.

The Suebic kingdom in Gallaecia lasted from 410 to 584 and seems to have enjoyed relatively stable government for most of that time. Historians like José António Lopes Silva, the translator of Idatius' chronicles, the primary written source for the 5th century, finds that the essential temper of Galician culture was established in the blending of Ibero-Roman culture with that of the Suebi.

There were occasional clashes with the Visigoths, who arrived in the Iberian Peninsula in 416 and came to dominate most of the peninsula, but the Suebi maintained their independence until 584, when the Visigothic King Leovigild, invaded the Suebic kingdom and finally defeated it, bringing it under Visigoth control.

Richard Fletcher (Fletcher 1984) points out that in Late Antiquity Galicia was still very much a part of the Roman and Mediterranean world. He instances the Galician nun Egeria's account of her pilgrimage to the Holy Land, 381–4 and the journey of the young Idatius, though living "at the uttermost limit of the world", who had met Jerome in the East; his chronicle shows that he remained aware of the affairs of the eastern Mediterranean and refers to travellers from the east coming to Galicia. As bishop Idatius travelled to Gaul on an embassy to Aetius, 431–2. Miro, king of the Suevi, had diplomatic relations with fellow barbarian kings in Neustria and Burgundy, but also with the emperors in Constantinople. Martin of Braga, a distinguished 6th century bishop, was a native of Pannonia. The Visigothic king Leovigild impounded the ships of Gaulish merchants in Galicia. At Lorenzana, the fine sarcophagus that received at a later date the mortal remains of count Osorio Gutiérrez, was probably an import from southern Gaul in the 7th century, Fletcher notes. And one of the coins in the Bordeaux hoard deposited about 700 was struck at a Galician mint, suggesting possible trade connections.

=== Arrival of the Britons and the founding of the diocese of Britonia ===
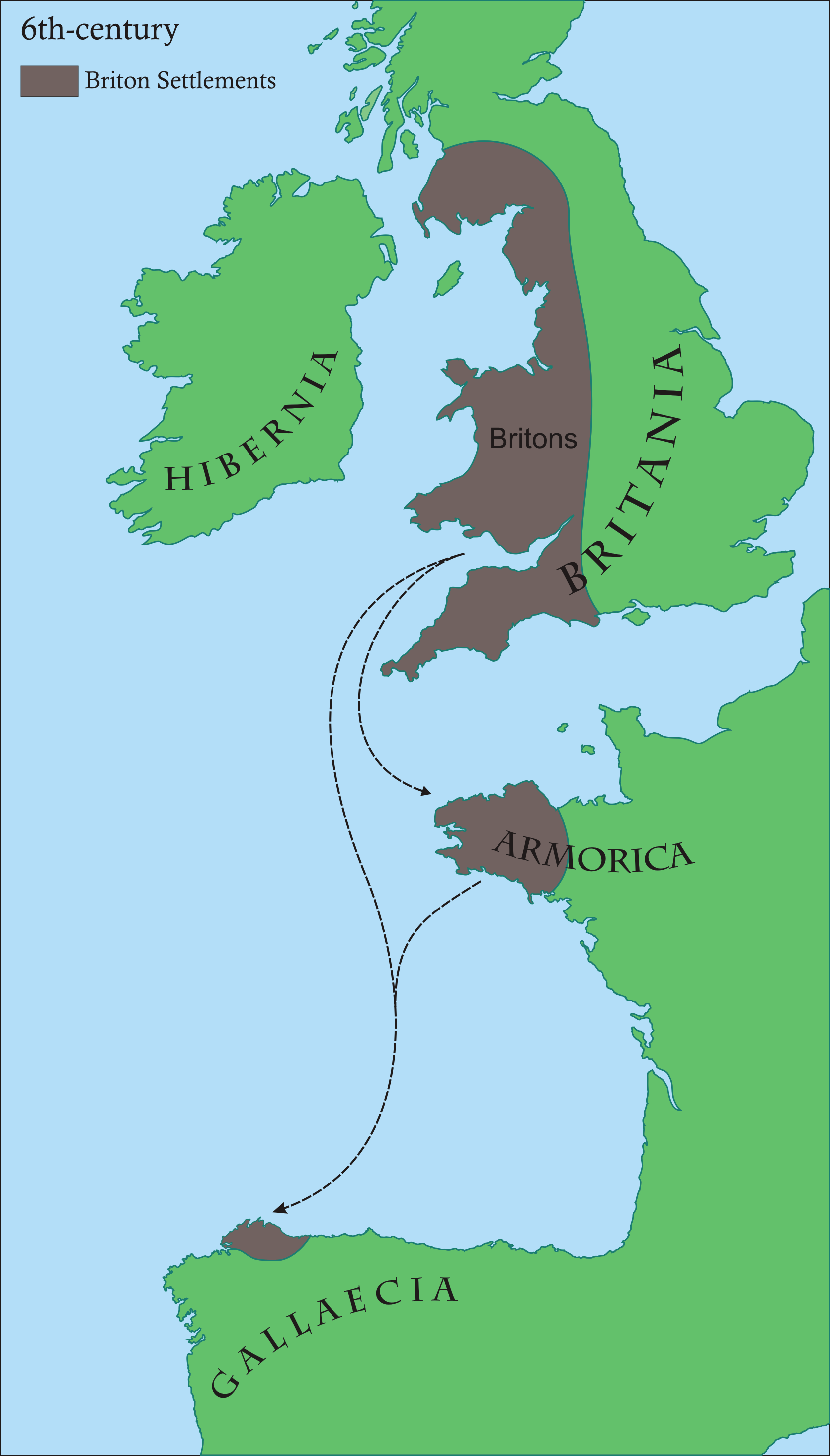
Briton settlements in the 6th century.

The political situation on the island of Britain between the 4th and 7th centuries had completely changed with the abandonment of the island by Rome and the constant arrival of Anglo-Saxon tribes, from northern Germany and Denmark to the eastern part of Great Britain. The constant aggression and harassment that Jutes and Anglo-Saxons carried out against the native Britons caused some of them to emigrate by sea to other points near the Atlantic coast, settling in what is now northwest France Armorica (consequently, becoming known as Brittany) and in the north of the ancient Gallaecia.

Nowadays, the cause of the displacement of some Britons to the north coast of Galicia and their reception by the Galician-Suevi remains unknown. Some authors suggest a possible military pact, or just acceptance by the native population. Organized in an important territory, introduced its own religious-Christian organization, actually bit different, and founded a bishopric itself that appears quoted in Parochiale Suevorum or Divisio Teodomiri, a document that shows the ecclesiastical organization of the kingdom of Galicia at the time of the monarchy sueva dated among 572 and 573. Its religious integration was complete, having watched his representative, – called Maeloc – to the Second Royal Council of Braga in 572.

The ancient territory of the diocese of Britonia Most of what is known about the settlement comes from ecclesiastical sources; records from the 572 Second Council of Braga refer to a diocese called the Britonensis ecclesia ("British church") and an episcopal see called the sedes Britonarum ("See of the Britons"), which was likely the monastery of Santa Maria de Bretoña. occupied mainly the coastal strip from the Lugo's coast to the Terra Chá, reaching his influence to the region of the Eo-Navia from the east and the west of Ferrol. Its ancient headquarters, known under the name Maximus Monastery was identified by some authors with the medieval Basilica of Saint Martin of Mondoñedo, were remnants of 5th–6th centuries. Changed its name and its headquarters on several occasions, currently the Galician diocese of Mondoñedo is its historical successor.

The settlement of this wave of Britons immigrants and the creation of their Christian diocese is the second largest settlement of a foreign people in the lands of Galicia, after the Suevi.

=== Visigothic Kingdom (585 – 711) ===
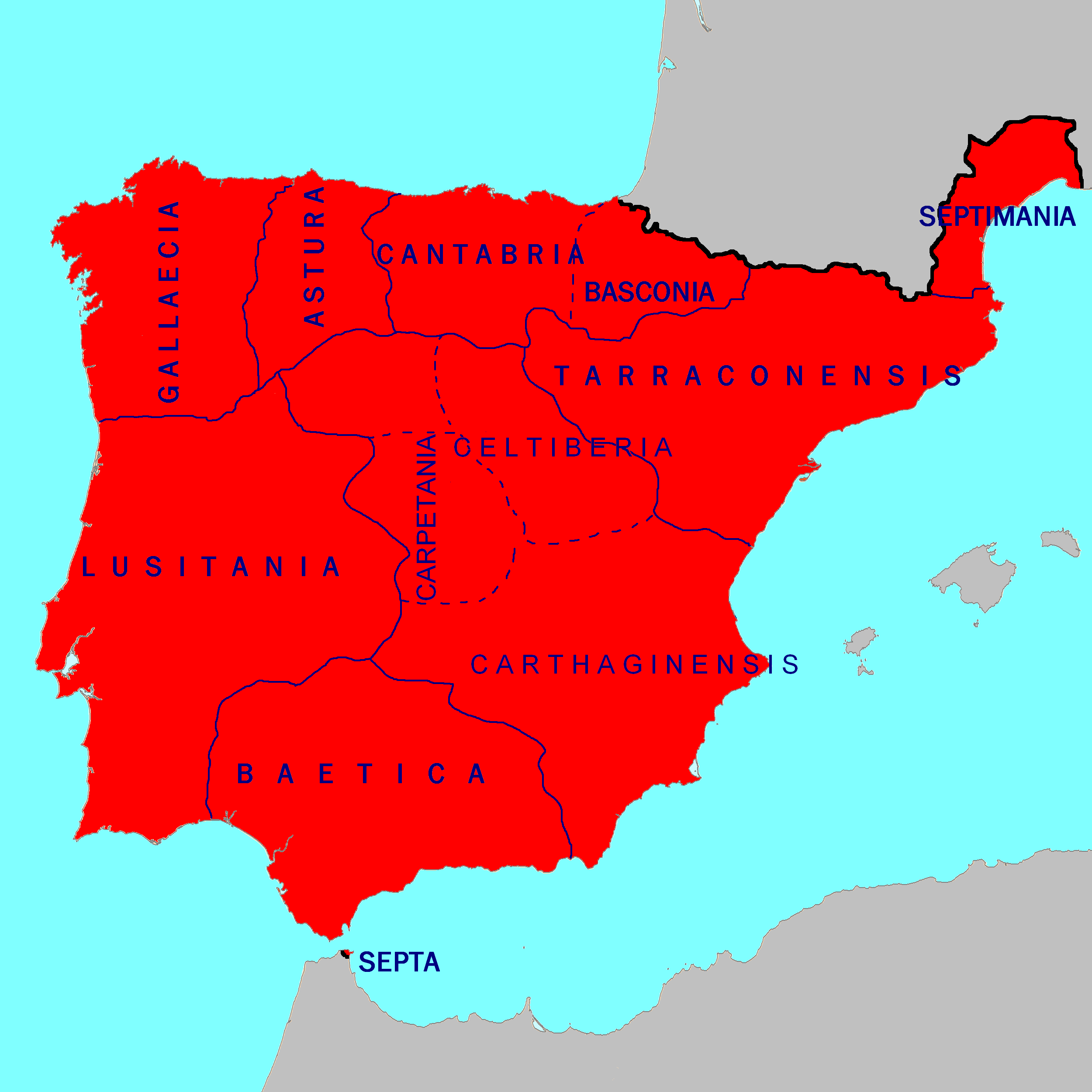
Visigothic Hispania and its regional divisions in 700, prior to the Muslim conquest.

With the Catholicization of the Visigothic kings, the Catholic bishops increased in power, until, at the synod held at Toledo in 633, they took upon themselves the nobles' right to select a king from among the royal family.

Rodrigo, the last elected king, was betrayed by Julian, count of Ceuta, who called for the Umayyad Muslims (or Moors) to enter Hispania. During the battle of Guadalete in 711, king Rodrigo lost his life. His left wing turned against him, as it was led by bishop Oppas, a collaborator with the Moors and a member of a rival royal faction. By the end of the battle the whole kingdom fell, and the throne was left empty, for the Moors did not allow the Oppas’ faction to regain it. One of the few survivors was Pelayo, a noble in charge of the royal guard (Comes Spatharius).

=== The kingdom of Asturias and Moorish Iberia ===
This marked the beginning of the Muslim conquest of Hispania in which most of peninsula came under Islamic rule by 718. This rapid conquest can be understood as a continuation of the civil wars that had afflicted the peninsula for centuries, as well as through the conversion to Islam of a significant part of the population.

Pelagius of Asturias is credited with beginning the Christian Reconquista of Iberia in 718 or 722, when he defeated the Umayyads in the Battle of Covadonga, and established the Kingdom of Asturias in the northern part of the peninsula.

Although the lands of the former Kingdom of Gallaecia were invaded by the Moors, there is no evidence of any invasion or occupation force ever crossing beyond the Galician mountains into Galicia proper or of going as far as occupying Asturica (modern León) and Gijón (modern Asturias). There is no evidence of any Moorish occupation of any settlement in modern Galicia and so it would be purely speculative to assume the region was ever conquered or even invaded by the Moors.

After being briefly occupied by the Moors, Asturias would revolt in 718 or 722, led by Pelagius of Asturias, and form the Kingdom of Asturias. In 736, Alfonso I of Asturias incorporated Galicia in his Kingdom of Asturias until 924, when it became the Kingdom of León.

During the early Reconquista, Galicia expanded south and established the County of Portugal in 868 and County of Coimbra in 878.

=== The discovery of the tomb of Saint James (813) ===
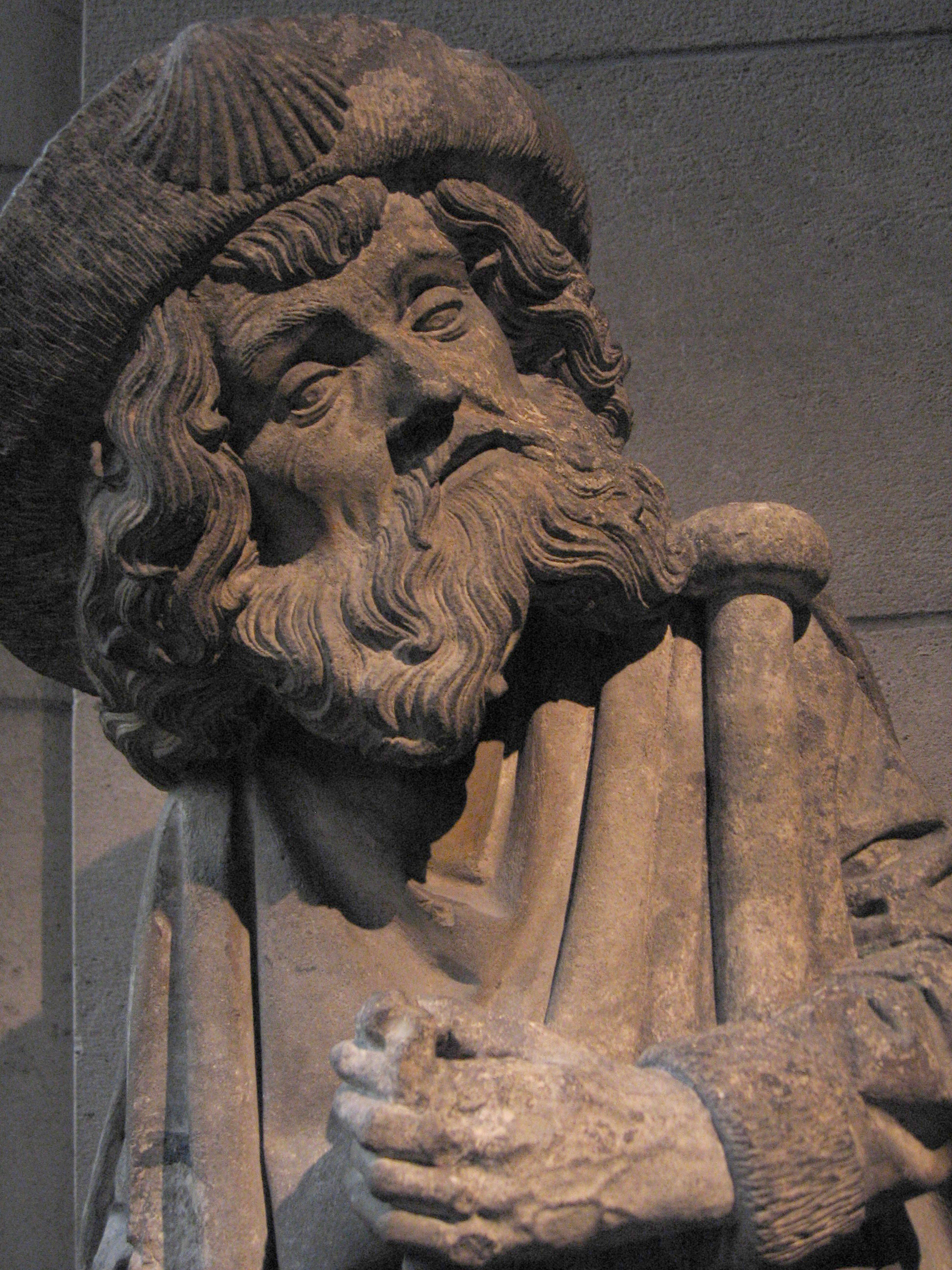
Burgundian Statue 15th century, it represents the apostle Saint James, dressed as pilgrim. Metropolitan Museum of Art.

In 813 an ark was discovered in Galicia that contained remains that were attributed to the apostle Saint James. According to Christian tradition, Pelagius the Hermit saw a star on a marble ark near to Libredon . Notified by Pelagius, Theodemir, the bishop of Iria Flavia, travelled quickly to the place, identifying the remains found there as the decapitated body of the Apostle James.

Myth or reality, this "discovery" was quickly magnified by the Galician-Asturian monarch, Alphonse II (791–842), who in the same year ordered build a church around the tomb, spreading the news throughout Christendom. Iria Flavia became the most powerful ecclesiastical administration, not only of high-medieval Gallaecia, but the entire Iberian Peninsula, increasing its power with the constant royal donations to the church of Santiago de Compostela. It was transformed into the third pilgrim centre of Christianity, just after Jerusalem and Rome. From the 11th and 12th centuries especially, pilgrims from many parts of Europe began arriving, including from Occitania, France, Navarra and Aragon-Catalonia (by land) and from the British Isles, Scandinavia, and German territories (by sea).

The pilgrim phenomenon was decisive in shaping the cultural and economic of the Kingdom of Galicia. This development happened especially during bishop Diego Gelmirez's tenure (1100–1136) who successfully converted Compostela into a metropolitan church (year 1122), the most important Christian dignity in Western Christianity after Rome. Around the Apostolic tomb grew not only a cathedral – great center of artistic and religious life – but a village and then a town, strongly established in the Middle Ages, with a commercial derivative of its status as a holy city. The city of Compostela would be where Galician kings were crowned, where the great Galician-Portuguese lyric school grew, and where the capital of Galicia has been located since the Middle Ages.

Historical and archaeological studies conducted in 20th century cathedral itself, however, revealed that during Gallaeci-Roman time and even during the Suevic period, Compostela was an important place where important dignitaries – civil or religious – had been buried since long before the year 813. Several specialists argued that the body attributed to the apostle Saint James was actually the body of Priscillian, patriarch of the Galicia church, beheaded at Trier in 385.

=== Reconquista ===
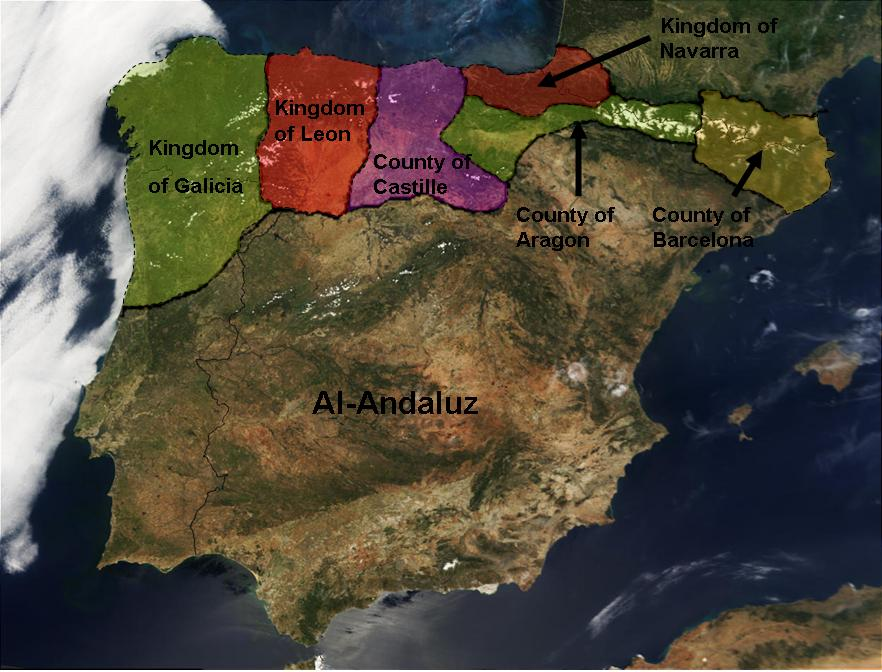
Iberian kingdoms c.925–929

During the 9th and 10th centuries, the counts of Galicia owed fluctuating obedience to their nominal sovereign, and Normans/Vikings occasionally raided the coasts. The Towers of Catoira See "Catoira History" (in Spanish)(Pontevedra) were built as a system of fortifications to stop Viking raids of Santiago de Compostela.

Constant rivalry between the Kingdom of León and the Kingdom of Castile opened rifts that could be exploited by outsiders, and Sancho III "the Great" of Navarre (1004–1035) absorbed Castile in the 1020s, and added León in the last year of his life, leaving Galicia to temporary independence. In the division of lands which followed his death, his son Fernando succeeded to the county of Castile. Two years later, in 1037, he conquered León and Galicia. In 1065, Ferdinand I of Castile and León divided his kingdom among his sons. Galicia was allotted to Garcia II of Galicia.

=== Kingdom of Galicia and Portugal ===
The Kingdom of Galicia and Portugal was formed in 1065 after the County of Portugal declared independence following the death of Ferdinand I of León. The Count of Portugal, Nuno Mendes, took advantage of the internal tension caused by the civil war between Ferdinand's sons to finally break off and declare himself an independent ruler. However, in 1071 king Garcia II defeated and killed him at the battle of Pedroso, and annexed his territory, adding the title of King of Portugal to his previous ones. In 1072, King Garcia II himself was defeated by his brother Sancho II of Castile and fled. In that same year, after Sancho's murder Alfonso VI became king of Castile and León; he imprisoned Garcia for life, proclaiming himself King of Galicia and Portugal as well, thus reuniting his father's realm. From that time Galicia remained part of the kingdom of Castile and León, although under differing degrees of self-government.

In 1095, Portugal separated almost definitely from the Kingdom of Galicia, both under the rule of the Kingdom of León, just like Castile (Burgos). Its territories consisting largely of mountain, moorland and forest, were bounded on the north by the Minho, on the south by the Mondego.

=== Santiago and Galicia ===
The translation of St James's relics to Galicia in the northwest of Iberia was achieved, in legend, by a series of miraculous happenings: decapitated in Jerusalem with a sword by Herod Agrippa himself, his body was taken up by angels, and sailed in a rudderless, unmanned boat to Iria Flavia in Spain, where a massive rock closed around his relics at Compostela. The Historia Compostellana provides a summary of the legend of St James as it was believed at Compostela in the 12th century. Two propositions are central to it: first, that St James preached the gospel in Spain as well as in the Holy Land; second, that after his martyrdom at the hands of Herod Agrippa I his disciples carried his body by sea to Spain, where they landed at Padrón on the coast of Galicia, and took it inland for burial at [Santiago de Compostela.

An even later tradition states that he miraculously appeared to fight for the Christian army during the Battle of Clavijo during the Reconquista, and was henceforth called Matamoros (Moor-slayer). Santiago y cierra España ("St James and strike for Spain") has been the traditional battle cry of Spanish armies.

St. James the Moorslayer, one of the most valiant saints and knights the world ever had ... has been given by God to Spain for its patron and protection.
— Cervantes, Don Quixote.

The possibility that a cult of James was instituted to supplant the Galician cult of Priscillian (executed in 385), who was widely venerated across the north of Spain as a martyr to the bishops rather than as a heretic, should not be overlooked.

== Modern Age ==
Galicia was subject to several raids in the 18th century. In 1719, a British expedition led by Lord Cobham captured Vigo and marched inland as far as Santiago de Compostela before withdrawing.

=== Emigration ===
Apparently due to unusually cold winters throughout the 1850s combined with the prevalence of subsistence agriculture, many Galician family farms went bankrupt.

The weather of the decade is sometimes likened to a mini Ice-Age. In January 1850, there was notable snowfall over much of Spain and by February a large number of wolves roamed the countryside. In February 1853, the Galician port cities of Ferrol and A Coruña reported heavy snowfall, a highly unusual event. February 1854 was again very cold—on the fourteenth Madrid registered a night-time temperature of -8 °C. January 1855 was again very cold and snowy over northern Spain.

The winter of 1856–57 was especially hard,

Official reports in the official bulletin of the Spanish government La Gaceta de Madrid highlighted the frostiness of the winter. From Puigcerda (Girona), "For more than a month the countryside has been snow-covered." From Biscay, "As a consequence of the copious snows that have fallen over our region during the past days, especially on the peaks of the Valley of Carranza, there has appeared down in the valley a strong pack of wolves that is inflicting great losses on herds of sheep and cattle." Announcements of planned wolf culls were numerous during those cold days of 1857...The snow fell over all of northern Spain from Galicia to Catalonia...On February 4 the province of Santander had spent three months without links with the interior, completely snowed in. "No one remembers such a prolonged spell of bad weather."

To compound the problem the main domestic industry also went into crisis.

From the second half of the 19th century onward Galicia's textile industry suffered a severe crisis brought on by the legal importation and the smuggling in of foreign fabrics, and many families endured hardship because there was no alternate source of employment. To make matters worse, the agricultural sector went into crisis between the years 1850–1860, destabilizing the rural economy. The composite crisis forced the population to look for a better life overseas.

The economic downturn accelerated the existing emigration.

There is evidence of a strong current of emigration from the year 1810 to 1853 that is difficult to quantify because the Spanish government did not condone emigration officially. Consequently, some authors refer to this obscure period as the period of clandestine emigration.

But from 1836 onward Spain began to grant official recognition to her newly independent colonies. Mexico was the first former colony to be recognized in 1836 and Uruguay, Chile and Argentina followed soon thereafter. As a result, emigration intensified...In December 1836 there appeared the first commercial advertisement offering transatlantic passage—aboard the [slave-ship] General Laborde—from A Coruña to Montevideo, Buenos Aires and other destinations in Mar del Plata. The offer of transatlantic crossings increased progressively. The majority of the crossings was made on sailing ships. In 1850 the brigantine Juan departed from Carril advertised as a first-class steamer. Relatively reliable data suggest that 93,040 Galicians left between the years 1836 and 1860.

The Spanish government legalized emigration in 1853, and this made the count reliable: 122,875 people left Galicia between the years 1860–1880.

The census of 1857 found 1,776,879 inhabitants in the region. Therefore, according to all these figures, over 12% of the population left Galicia during the period 1836–1880.

Emigration continued well into the 20th century. The noted Galician writer and politician Alfonso Castelao (1886–1950)—himself an expatriate twice, during his childhood and after the outbreak of the Spanish Civil War in 1936—chose to see in emigration both an economic imperative and the affirmation of a dauntless spirit. However, the reality of leaving one's homeland was unpleasant for most, whether in the 19th or 20th century, as the photographs of Manuel Ferrol attest.

== Contemporary Galicia ==
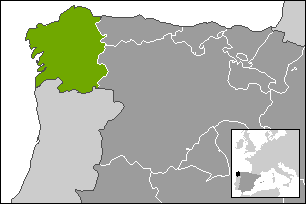
Modern borders of Galicia.

Galician nationalist and federalist movements arose in the 19th century, and after the Second Spanish Republic was declared in 1931, Galicia became an autonomous region following a referendum.

Following the Spanish Civil War and once established the Spanish State, Galicia's autonomy statute was annulled (as were those of Catalonia and the Basque provinces). Francoist Spain also suppressed any official promotion of the Galician language (although its everyday use was never proscribed). During the last decade of Franco's rule, there was a renewal of nationalist sentiment in Galicia.

Following the transition to democracy following Franco's death in 1975, Galicia regained its status as an autonomous region within Spain. Varying degrees of nationalist or separatist sentiment are evident at the political level. The only nationalist party of any electoral significance, the Bloque Nacionalista Galego or BNG, advocates greater autonomy from the Spanish state, and the preservation of Galician heritage and culture. Other factions advocate total independence from Spain, while some smaller groupings aspire to integrate with Portugal and the Portuguese-speaking world. However, the nationalist parties have hitherto obtained only minority electoral support at election time.

From 1990 to 2005, the region's government and parliament, the Xunta de Galicia was presided over by the Partido Popular ('People's Party', Spain's main national conservative party) under Manuel Fraga, a former minister and ambassador in the Francoist government. However, in the 2005 Galician elections, the People's Party lost its overall majority, while just remaining the largest party in the parliament.

In the event, power passed to a coalition between the Partido Socialista de Galicia (PSdeG) ('Galician Socialist Party'), a regional sister-party of Spain's main socialist party, the Partido Socialista Obrero Español ('Spanish Socialist Workers Party') and the BNG. As the senior partner in the new coalition, the PSdeG nominated its leader, Emilio Perez Touriño, to serve as Galicia's new president.

== See also ==
- Timeline of Galician history
- Suebi
