= St. Olavsleden =

Pilgrim's path from Selånger, Sweden to Nidaros, Norway

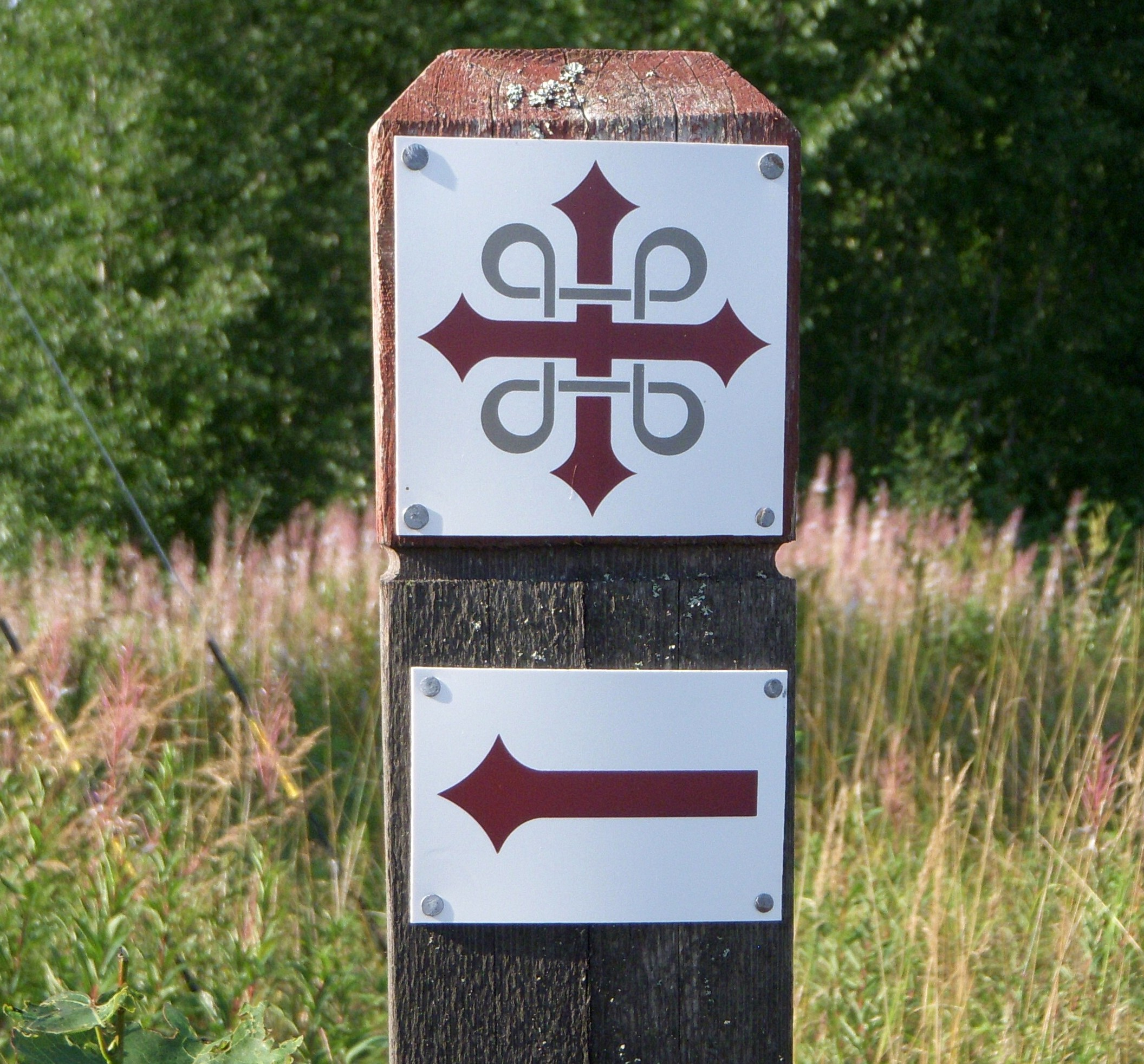
St. Olav symbol marking St. Olavsleden

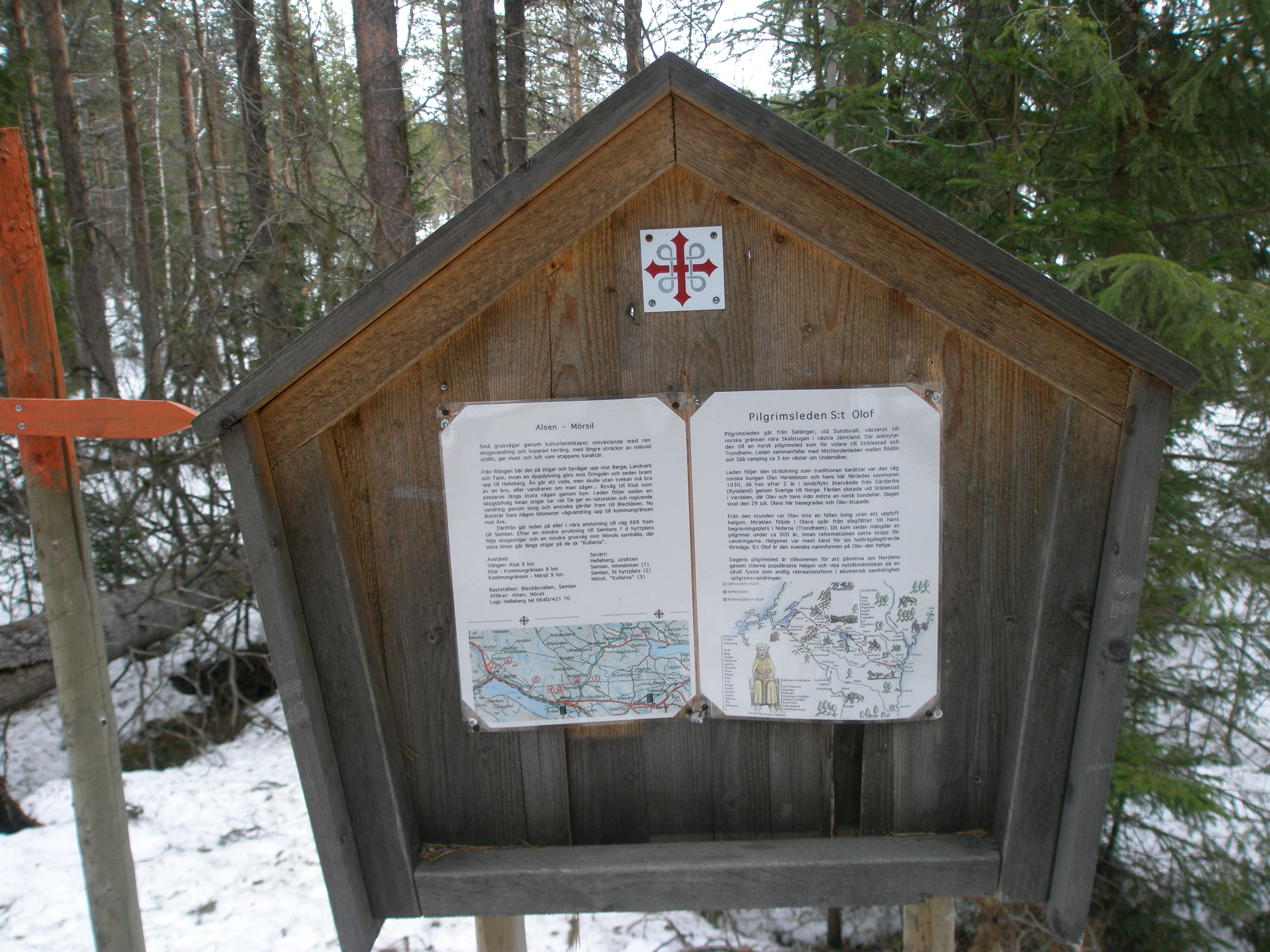
St. Olavsleden between Alsen and Mörsil in Jämtland

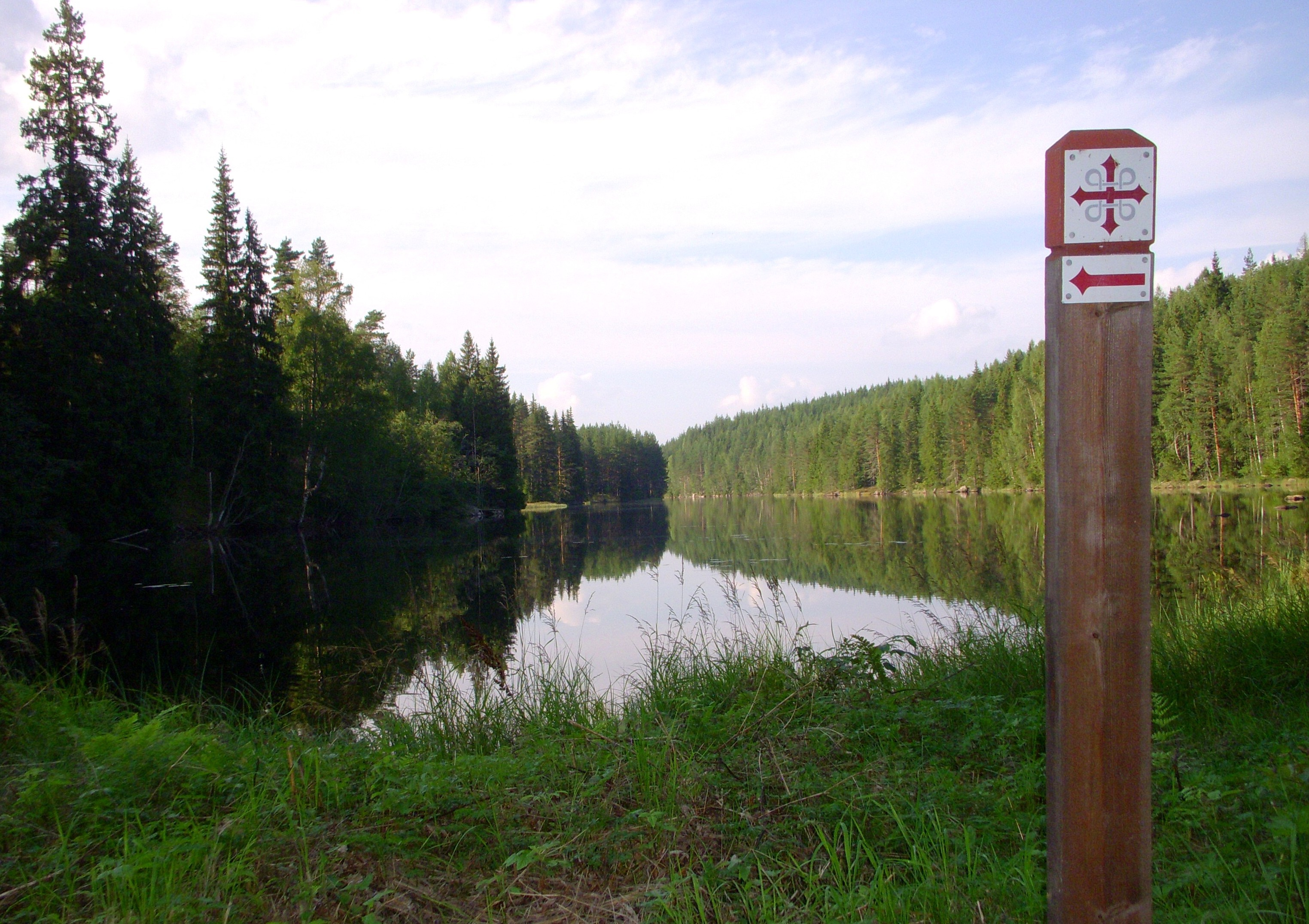
St. Olavsleden at Frötjärnen in Dalarna

St. Olavsleden (English: St. Olav's Path; Swedish: S:t Olavsleden), is a pilgrim's way between Selånger outside Sundsvall in Sweden and Nidaros Cathedral in Trondheim in Norway, commemorating Saint Olaf who was King of Norway from 1015 to 1028. St. Olavsleden was one of the Pilgrim's Routes. From the 1970s until 2012, it was called the Mittnordenleden.

Today St. Olavsleden stretches 564 kilometres (350 mi) from the Bothnian sea in the east to the Atlantic Ocean in the west through two countries and eleven municipalities.

The trail is marked with the St. Olav symbol, which marks all the so-called St. Olav roads (Swedish: S:t Olavsvägar), leading towards Nidaros Cathedral. St. Olavsleden passes through the ancient cultural landscape, following as closely as possible the roads and paths that pilgrims of that time and other travelers wandered and rode. The first hundred kilometers the trail mostly follows Ljungan river, and in Jämtland the trail goes along the lakes Revsundssjön and Storsjön, and eventually Indalsälven river. St. Olavsleden crosses the Scandinavian mountains on the border between Sweden and Norway along Swedish county road 322 (Skalstuguvägen) and in Norway goes through the agricultural landscape near the Trondheim fjord. St. Olavsleden is moderately hilly which makes it suitable for cycling.

== History ==
Today's knowledge of St. Olaf comes mainly from the Icelandic historian Snorri Sturluson, dead in 1241, who wrote a large number of royal sagas in his Heimskringla, one of which tells about King Olaf. In 995, Olaf Haraldsson (Óláfr Haraldsson) was born in Ringerike in southern Norway. At the age of 12 he set out on a Viking voyage and it took many years before he returned to Norwegian soil. Olaf eventually became a skilled and experienced Viking with long trips in the Baltic sea and all the way down to Spain. On October 16, 1013, Olaf was baptized in French Rouen, and his significance for the Christian Church began with this baptism. In 1015 Olaf stood again on Norwegian ground and aimed to unite Norway with himself as a king and to introduce Christianity in Norway. As part of this, he tried to build an alliance with the Swedish king Olof Skötkonung, which among other things led to a marriage with Olof's daughter Astrid. In 1020 Olaf Haraldsson was the king of a united Norway, and in 1024 a new legislation was introduced which was based on the Canon law. This legislation had a profound effect on Norwegian society through its ambition to change old local traditions. This led to increased dissatisfaction with Olaf. The resistance grew, and Olaf was forced to leave the country in 1028 and make his way to Novgorod, where his sister-in-law Ingegerd lived, married to Tsar Yaroslav. Olaf stayed in Novgorod for almost two years, before deciding to return to Norway and reclaim the crown.

According to the legend recorded in the 1680s, at the beginning of July 1030 after a few years of exile, Olaf came ashore in the parish of Selånger in Sundsvall. This harbor was first mentioned in a written source from the 1530s, and in the 17th century it was called King's Harbor or Selånger's Harbor. King Olaf supposedly erected a copper-clad cross in the harbor which should still have remained there forty years before the story was written down. He went to Norway with his army to Christianize the country and take back the king's throne. The trip ended in Stiklestad, where Olaf was killed during the Battle of Stiklestad on July 29.

Almost immediately after his death, rumors began to spread about Olaf's holiness- Olav den hellige. A little over a year later - on August 3, 1031 - the body was excavated in the presence of Bishop Grimketel. The bishop canonized Olaf, and his remains were moved to St. Clement's church in Nidaros. The construction of the Nidaros Cathedral, a burial church for St. Olaf, began 1070. It was founded on the place where his remains were buried in the ground after the battle in Stiklestad. The burial site started to attract pilgrims from all over Europe.

== Selånger ==
Selånger was the starting point for the most important transport route between Norway and Sweden during the Middle Ages and according to Swedish historian Nils Ahnlund (1889–1957) it might have been used during the Viking Age. Hardware trading in the north–south direction is believed to have taken place in Selånger's shipping port (at an easily accessible land connection between the sea and river Ljungan), as early as the 6th century, resulting in a wealth revealed in finds made in the Högom chamber grave (Högoms gravfält) in Selånger parish. Selånger church ruins are located near the harbor.

== Pilgrim's way ==
Nidaros and its Cathedral became one of the most important pilgrimage destinations of the Christian world in parity with Jerusalem, Rome and Santiago de Compostela. A large number of pilgrims from all over the Christian world visited Nidaros Cathedral annually. In connection with the Reformation, however, the number of pilgrims decreased, and in Sweden pilgrimage was banned in 1544.

However, the memory of Olaf's march from Selånger to Trondheim remained alive. Along the trail there are many St. Olaf's springs, and in several churches there are medieval sculptures depicting St. Olaf. Åre Old Church (Åre gamla kyrka) became one of these central meeting places which holds a wooden sculpture of Olaf from the 1300s but with a Carolean wooden tricorn hat from 1719 instead of the lost crown. In many towns and villages there are street names, connected to St. Olaf and to pilgrimage, including Pilgrim's road (Pilgrimsvägen). In the western part of Bräcke municipality in the region of Jämtland there is the community of Pilgrimstad.

Over the years, there have been made efforts on the local level to preserve parts of the trail. Prior to the 1000th anniversary of Trondheim in 1997, the Diocese of Härnösand took the initiative to revive interest in St. Olavsleden. Sundsvall, Östersund and Trondheim have had a collaboration since 1999, working together and making investments to popularize hiking tourism. The partnership between the County Administrative Board of Jämtland and Olav's Festival (Olavsfestdagene) in Trondheim had the same goal.

== The hiking trail today ==
On September 7, 2013, St. Olav's path was re-opened with hikes and a service in Nidaros Cathedral. The route has been recreated as follows: Selånger - Tuna - Stöde - Torp - Borgsjö - Jämtkrogen - Bräcke - Gällö - Revsund - Pilgrimstad - Brunflo - Östersund - Frösön - Alsen - Mattmar - Järpen - Undersåker - Åre - Medstugan - Skalstugan - Sul - Stiklestad – Stjørdal - Trondheim.

== See also ==
- Pilgrim's Route

== Related reading ==
- Raju, Alison (2015) The Pilgrim Road to Trondheim: Oslo to Nidaros Cathedral (Trondheim: Museumsforlaget) ISBN 978-82-83-05004-2
- Kollandsrud, Mari (1997) Pilgrimsleden til Nidaros (Oslo: Gyldendal) ISBN 978-82-05-24786-4
- Hansen, Knut Ingar (1997) Pilegrimsgang til Nidaros (Oslo: Gyldendal Tiden) ISBN 978-82-478-0028-7
