= Kystpilgrimsleia =

Tourism in Norway

Coordinates: 60°18′26″N 5°11′51″E

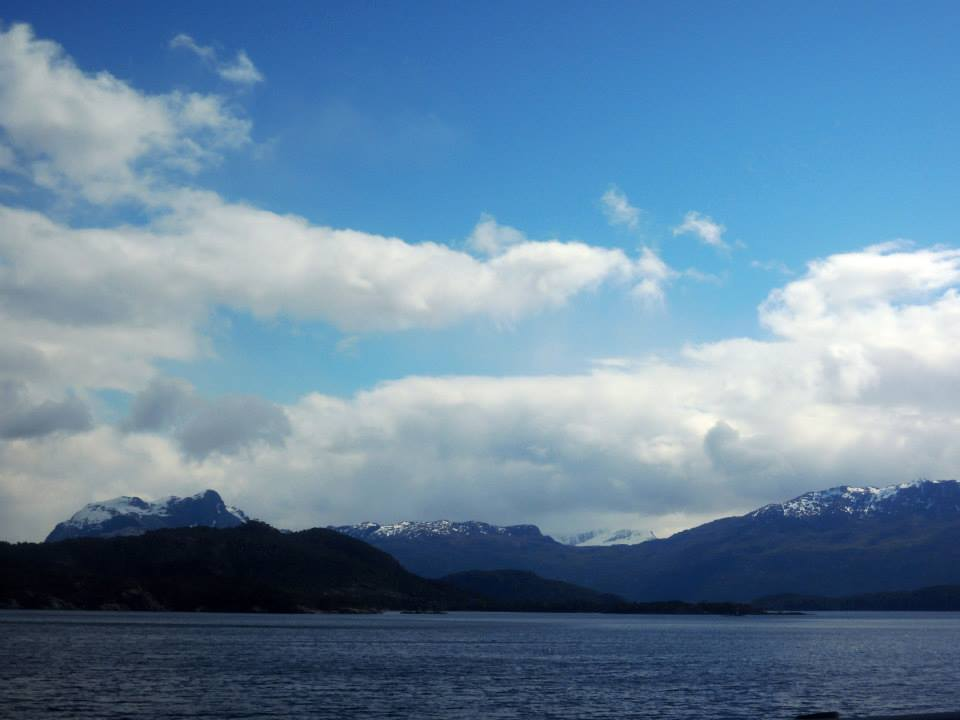

Kystpilgrimsleia, Norwegian for "Coastal Pilgrim Route", is the name of the pilgrim way that runs along the west coast of Norway and culminates at the Nidaros Cathedral in Trondheim. Kystpilgrimsleia is a joint project between four counties and four diocese to create a comprehensive and sustainable tourism product that promotes cultural heritage and provides a unique experience of more all the fjords of Norway.

== History ==
The Coastal Pilgrim Route along the Norwegian coast was one of the most important and perhaps the most widely used pilgrim routes of the Middle Ages going to Nidaros, now called Trondheim. The Nidaros Cathedral kept the relics by the Norwegian holy king St. Olav was taken care of. The Coastal Pilgrim route is mentioned in written sources already in the late 1000s.

The shrine in Nidaros was mentioned in historical texts as early as 1075, for example in the works of Adam of Bremen's "Bremen's Gesta Pontificum Hammaburgensis ecclesiae". The first church on the Nidaros site was built in 1075 over the site of St Olav's grave, where Nidaros Cathedral now sits. There are also the various accounts for pilgrimage routes to Nidaros, including coastal pilgrim way: "If you sail from Aalborg and Vendsyssel in Denmark, you come to Viken in a day, which is a town in Norway (probably Oslo). From there you hold left and sail along the coast of Norway and on the fifth day you reach the city Trondheim. One can also get an other road, which leads from the Danes in their Scania overland to Trondheim. But this road over the mountains takes longer, and since it is dangerous, it is avoided by the pilgrims.» Arriving by sea by Kystpilgrimsleia- constituted thus, according to Adam of Bremen, the most used artery to Nidaros, although the sea route was also dangerous with changing weather and pirates. Both Norwegian and foreign pilgrims flocked here, either to travel all the way to Nidaros, or to visit many of the local shrines.

== Tourism in the fjords ==
Kystpilgrimsleia is a project under development (2014-2017). When ready, the route will consist of easy-to-access information on how to travel the route, by kayak, canoe or boat as well as a well developed network of high quality tourism supply of various kinds.
