= Jämtlands Bryggeri =

Swedish microbrewery

Coordinates: 62.95143°N 15.04561°E

- Location: Pilgrimstad, Sweden
- Opened: 1996
- Annual production volume: 7500hL

Active beers
Name	Type
Bärnsten	Pilsener
Fallen Angel	Premium bitter
Heaven	Schwarzbier
Hell	Premium lager
India Pale Ale	Pale ale
Oatmeal Bitter	Premium bitter
Oatmeal porter	Porter
Postiljon	Pale ale
Pilgrim	Pale ale
President	Pilsener
Tiotaggare	Strong ale

Seasonal beers
Name	Type
Julöl	Christmas beer
Påsköl	Easter beer

Jämtlands Bryggeri is a microbrewery located in the small village of Pilgrimstad located in the Municipality of Bräcke in Jämtland, in north western part Sweden.

The brewery started brewing beer in January 1996 and is one of Sweden’s smallest breweries. The outspoken policy of the brewery is to brew beer in small quantities in order to guarantee a high quality in the production. The yearly production amounts to 750.000 liters of beer. Today, the brewery has a standing assortment of eleven different brands of beers reflecting a number of various brewing techniques.

The brewery is regularly awarded at the annual Stockholm Beer Festival (where approximately 600 brands of beers are competing). The company has competed in the festival the last eight years and has totally been awarded 58 gold medals, 28 silver medals and 14 bronze medals.

== Availability ==
In Sweden, all of the brewery's beers can be bought or ordered at the Systembolaget.

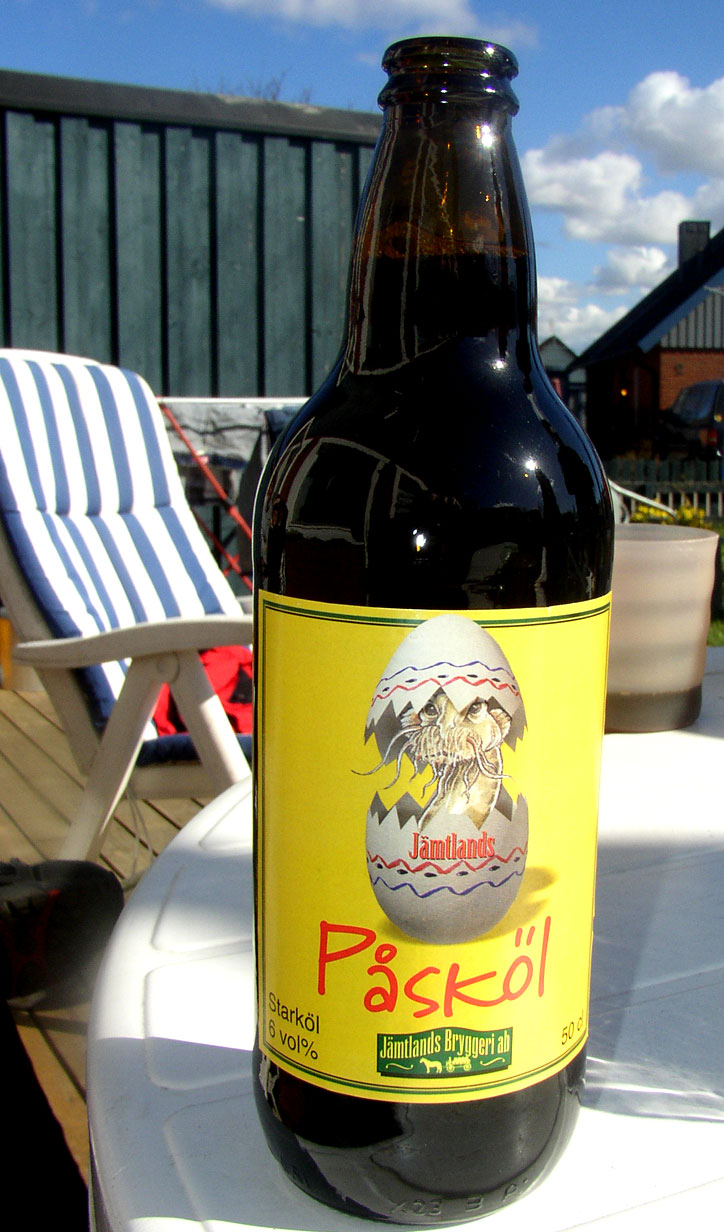
Påsköl is specially brewed for Easter.

== Retired beers ==
- Anniversary Ale - English strong ale.
- Baltic Stout - Baltic stout.
- Bärsärk Strong Ale - Ale.
- Bière De Printemps - Fruit beer.
- Hummel Extrême - Pale lager.
- Mellan Lager - Pale lager.
- Pilgrimstad Mammut - Oktoberfest/Märzen.
- Serbian Crown - Pale lager.
- Strong Ale - Ale.
- Valborg Vårbrygd - Pale lager.
- Weiss-President - Hefeweizen.
- Äppelweisen - Fruit beer.
