= Ann Vansteenkiste =

Belgian tea expert, herbalist, and tea sommelier

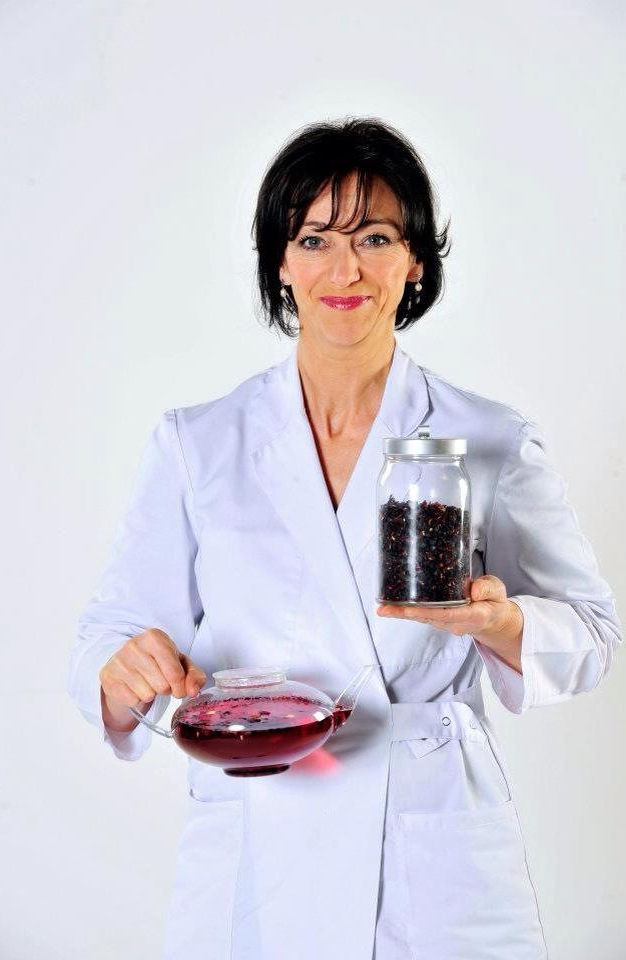
Ann Vansteenkiste

Ann Vansteenkiste is a Belgian tea expert, herbalist, aromatherapist, and tea sommelier, based in West-Vlaanderen, Belgium. She is best known for founding Curiosithee, a company specializing in biodynamic and organic tea, and for her educational efforts in promoting tea culture, sustainable sourcing, and the health benefits of tea.

== Early life and education ==
Ann Vansteenkiste was born and raised in West-Vlaanderen, Belgium. She pursued studies in household science, with a focus on diet, vegetarian, and ecological cooking. Her interest in tea began while writing her thesis on the Camellia sinensis plant, which eventually led her to become the first certified tea sommelier in the Benelux region.

== Career ==
=== Founding Curiosithee ===
Vansteenkiste founded Curiosithee, a company dedicated to selecting and promoting biodynamic and organic teas. She travels annually to tea-growing regions such as China to source high-quality teas, emphasizing ethical practices and sustainable farming. Her work ensures the fair treatment of tea farmers and promotes environmentally friendly cultivation methods.

=== Contributions to culinary arts ===
As a tea master (Theemeester), Vansteenkiste collaborates with top chefs in Belgium and the Netherlands, helping them design tea menus that complement their culinary creations. She has become a prominent figure in the hospitality industry, advising restaurants and hotels on the art of tea pairing and preparation.

=== Educator and trainer ===
Vansteenkiste has taught the Theesommelier programme at Syntra Midden-Vlaanderen in Ghent, covering tea tasting, tea ceremonies, and blending. She also serves as a trainer at Horeca Forma, where she educates hospitality professionals on topics such as tea preparation, kombucha brewing, and iced tea production.

== Publications ==
Ann Vansteenkiste has authored several books on the cultural, therapeutic, and culinary aspects of tea, including:

De Stille Kracht van Thee (The Quiet Power of Tea) – A guide to the cultural traditions and meditative qualities of tea.

Zelfgeplukt (Self-Picked) – A book exploring the benefits of locally foraged herbs and plants for tea.

De Helende Kracht van Thee (The Healing Power of Tea) – A detailed examination of tea's health benefits and its role in holistic well-being.

De Kruidenvrouw van de Camino (The Herb Woman of the Camino, 2026) – A personal account of walking the Camino Primitivo, combining foraging and herbal knowledge with a pilgrimage narrative.

== Personal life ==
Ann Vansteenkiste is often described as a "sympathieke West-Vlaamse" (sympathetic West-Flemish woman). She is a mother of seven children and has spoken in interviews about balancing her passion for tea with her family life. Her fascination with tea reportedly began at a young age, inspired by her childhood idol, David Cassidy, who was known to drink tea daily.
