= Camino Primitivo =

Pilgrimage route in Spain

The Primitive Way
- Camino Primitivo (Spanish)
- Map of the Camino Primitivo
- Interactive map of The Primitive Way
- Type: Pilgrims' way
- Location: From Oviedo to Lugo to Santiago de Compostela

UNESCO World Heritage Site
- Type: Cultural
- Criteria: ii, iv, vi
- Designated: 1993 (17th session)
- Part of: Routes of Santiago de Compostela: Camino Francés and Routes of Northern Spain
- Reference no.: 669bis-001
- Region: Europe and North America

The Primitive Way (also called Original Way, Spanish: Camino Primitivo) is one of the paths of the Camino de Santiago. It begins in the old Asturian capital of Oviedo and runs west to Lugo and then south to Santiago de Compostela joining the more popular French Way in Melide for the last two hiking days. According to the Confraternity of St James, the Camino Primitivo is approximately 320 km (199 miles) in length.

== Middle Ages ==
The Camino Primitivo is thought of as the "Original Way" because it is reportedly the path taken by the first reported pilgrim, Alfonso II of Asturias (c. 760 – 842), nicknamed the Chaste (Spanish: el Casto). The King left his capital, Oviedo, in the year 814 to travel to the present location of the city of Santiago de Compostela, at the time known as Libredon. Alfonso built the original shrine to Saint James on the spot of the discovery of the remains by Pelayo and Theodemir. Until the city of León was established as both the capital of the Kingdom of León and the nexus of a safe route — the French Way — for pilgrims travelling across the Meseta, the Camino Primitivo remained the most frequented route for those going to Santiago for religious reasons.

== Modern revival ==
The Camino Primitivo features as a popular alternative path, which avoids most of the much heavier-travelled Camino Francés and the crowds of pilgrims there. Though incorporating significant vertical components, it allows hikers to enjoy a more stimulating journey with better views.

The route has been growing rapidly in popularity in recent years, with corresponding improvements to waymarking and thanks to the provision of hostel accommodation for pilgrims (the so-called albergues).

The distance from Lugo to Santiago de Compostela is 100 km, which makes this last section eligible to receive the certificate of accomplishment.

== Statistics ==
The Pilgrims office publishes statistics regarding pilgrims who finished the Camino Primitivo. In 2024, about 24,400 pilgrims did this route, which was the fifth most popular. About half of the people doing the Original Way had a Spanish nationality (49%), followed by Italians (6.5%), US-Americans (6.3%) and Germans (4.5%). The most popular starting points are Oviedo (58%) and Lugo (33%). Most pilgrims finish this route in August.
