= Pelagius the Hermit =

Spanish hermit (died c. 950)

St. Pelagius the Hermit
- Died: c. 950
- Venerated in: Roman Catholic Church
- Feast: 30 August

Pelagius (Spanish: Pelayo, Paio or Pelagio) was a hermit or anchorite who lived in Solovio in the Libredón forest in 813 AD.

== Narrative ==
According to some sources, Solovio was an ancient Celtic fort, but other sources take it to be a necropolis that was used under Roman and Visigothic rule. The Church of San Félix de Solovio in Santiago de Compostela is on that site today. For several nights, Pelagius saw several mysterious blazes, like a shower of stars, on the same hill in the forest at Libredón every night. Other accounts also mention supernatural music accompanying the visual miracle.

Pelagius, amazed at these lights, appeared before Bishop Theodemir of Iria Flavia (now called Padrón) to tell him about the miracle. On 25 July 812, Theodemir gathered a small entourage and went to Solovio to see the phenomenon for himself. There, in the dense vegetation, they discovered a stone sepulchre in which rested the corpses of three men, who were immediately identified as the Apostle James the Great and two of his disciples, Theodore and Athanasius. Theodemir believed that this was in line with the Breviary of the Apostles, which taught that James was buried in an ark in Marmarica (arca marmarica), probably an ark from Marmarica, Ancient Libya. but he said "arca de mármol" or an ark of marble was meant.

The bishop recognised that the event was a miracle and informed King Alfonso II of Asturias. Alfonso ordered the construction of a chapel on the site which would gradually become a major site of pilgrimage. The route that the king took to reach the site became the Camino Primitivo, or the Primitive Way, that was considered the oldest and safest pilgrimage route to St. James' shrine throughout the Medieval Period. This chapel was initially converted into a church in 829 and was later refurbished in the pre-Romanesque style in 899, by the order of Alfonso III. Finally in 1075, under the reign of Alfonso VI, the construction of the Santiago de Compostela Cathedral began.

Authors who see the pilgrimage site to Santiago as being a Reconquistador invention sometimes see St. Pelagius as the forger of the relics, traditions and site.

A saint called Pelagius the Hermit is venerated as a martyr but he is said to have lived in the 10th century.

== See also ==
- Camino de Santiago

== Bibliography ==
- Aurora Ruiz Mateos, Daniel Abad Rossi (1997). El Camino de Santiago. Ediciones AKAL. ISBN 8446006332.
- Cordula Rabe (2010). Camino del Norte. Traducido por Mónica Sainz Meister. Bergverlag Rother GmbH. ISBN 978-3763347148.
- Garrido Torres, Carlos (2000). Las Guías visuales de España: Galicia. Depósito legal: B 18469. El País.
- "Un extraordinario hallazgo". Camino de Santiago.
