= James the Great =

Apostle of Jesus (died 44)

Saint James the Great
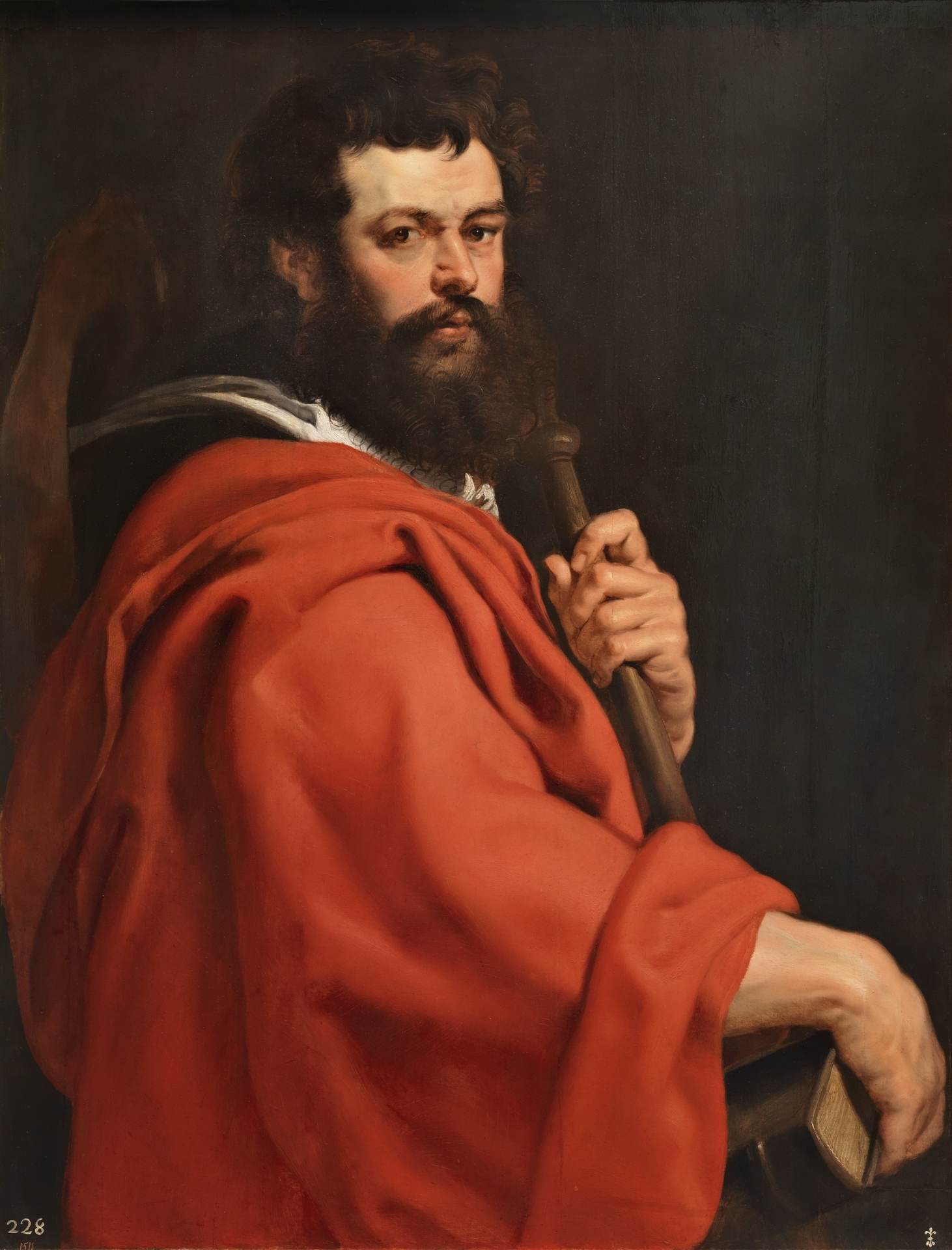
- Portrait by Peter Paul Rubens, c. 1612–1613

Apostle and Martyr
- Born: Bethsaida, Galilee, Roman Empire
- Died: AD 44; Jerusalem, Judea, Roman Empire
- Honored in: All Christian denominations that venerate saints, Islam (named as one of the apostles of Jesus)
- Canonized: Pre-Congregation
- Feast: 25 July (Western Christianity); 30 April (Eastern Christianity); 30 December (Mozarabic Rite)
- Attributes: Red Martyr, Scallop, Pilgrim's hat
- Patronage: Places; Spain, Guatemala, Seattle, Orlando, Levoča, Nicaragua, Cali, Guayaquil, Betis Church, Guagua, Pampanga, Badian, Cebu, Bolinao, Ibaan, Pasuquin, Plaridel, Bulacan, Paombong, Paete, Sogod, Cebu, Compostela, Cebu, Santiago, Santiago Acahualtepec, and some places in Mexico. Professions; Veterinarians, equestrians, furriers, tanners, pharmacists, oyster fishers, woodcarvers.

James the Great (Koine Greek: Ἰάκωβος, romanized: Iákōbos; Classical Syriac: ܝܥܩܘܒ, romanized: Yaʿqōḇ; died c. 44) was one of the Twelve Apostles of Jesus. According to the New Testament, he was the second of the apostles to die, after Judas Iscariot, and the first to be martyred. Saint James is the patron saint of Spain and, according to tradition, what are believed to be his remains are held in Santiago de Compostela in Galicia, Spain.

He was also known as James the Apostle; James, son of Zebedee; James, brother of John; James, Son of Thunder, Saint James the Great; Saint James the Greater; St. James the Major; Saint James the Elder; Saint Jacob; and Santiago.

== In the New Testament ==
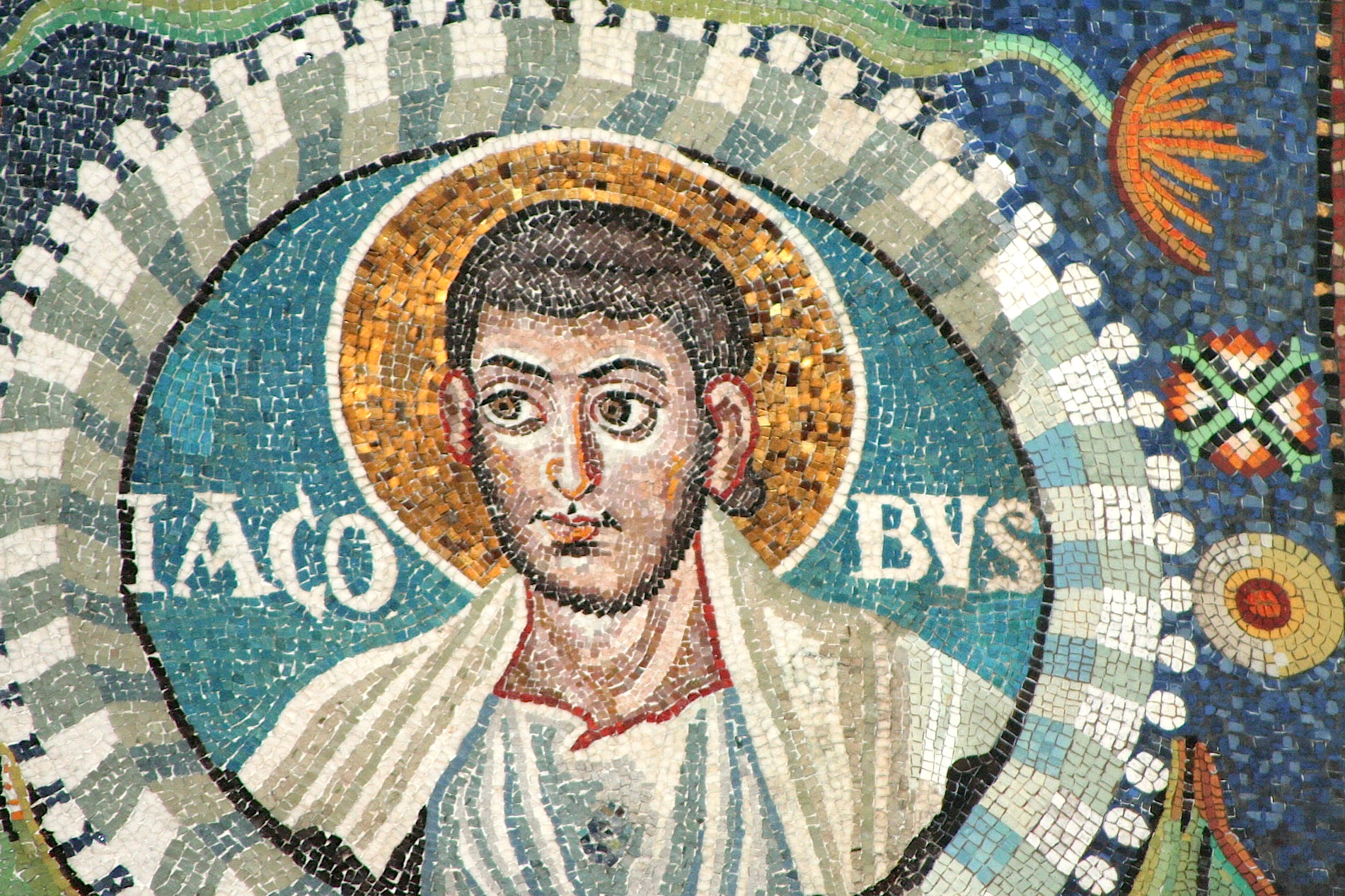
James the Apostle, detail of the mosaic in the Basilica of San Vitale, Ravenna, 6th century

James was born into a family of Jewish fishermen on the Sea of Galilee. His parents were Zebedee and Salome. Salome was a sister of Mary (mother of Jesus) which made James the Great a cousin of Jesus. James is styled "the Greater" to distinguish him from the other apostle James "the Lesser," with "greater" meaning older or taller, rather than more important. James the Great was the brother of John the Apostle.

James is described as one of the first disciples to join Jesus. The Synoptic Gospels state that James and John were preparing to fish with their father by the seashore when Jesus called them to follow him.

James, along with his brother John, and Peter, formed an informal triumvirate among the Twelve Apostles. Jesus allowed them to be the only apostles present at three particular occasions during his public ministry: the raising of Jairus' daughter, the transfiguration of Jesus, and Jesus' agony in the Garden of Gethsemane. James and John (or, in another tradition, their mother) asked Jesus to grant them seats on his right and left in his glory. Jesus rebuked them, asking if they were ready to drink from the cup he was going to drink from and saying the honor was not even for him to grant. The other apostles were annoyed with them. James and his brother wanted to call down fire on a Samaritan town, but were rebuked by Jesus.

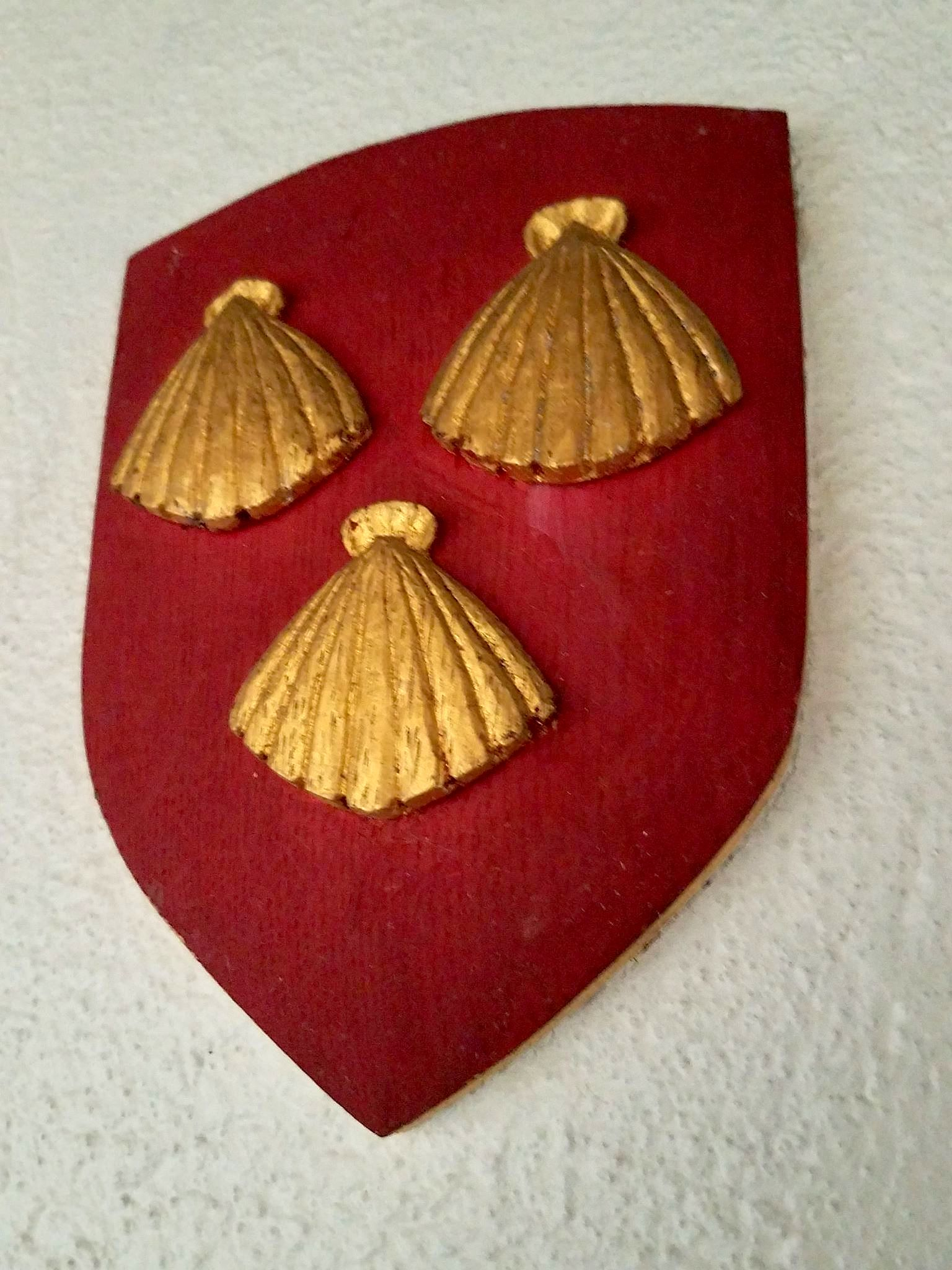
Shield with symbol of St. James the Great, Church of the Good Shepherd (Rosemont, Pennsylvania)

The Acts of the Apostles records that "Herod the king" (usually identified with Herod Agrippa) had James executed "by the sword". Henry Alford suggests that he was probably beheaded. Nixon suggests his death may have been triggered by James' fiery temper, from which he and his brother earned the nickname Boanerges or "Sons of Thunder". F. F. Bruce contrasts this story with that of the Liberation of Saint Peter, and writes that the proposition that "James should die while Peter should escape" is a "mystery of divine providence".

== Veneration ==
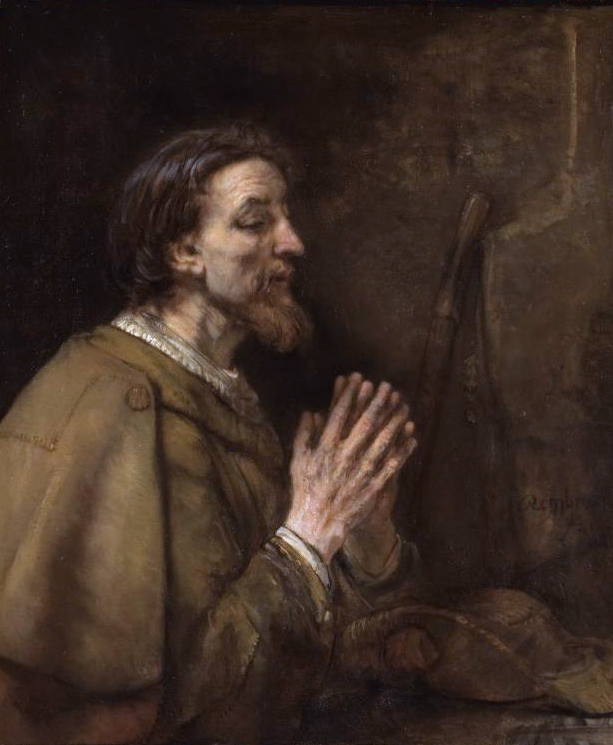
Saint James the Elder was painted by Rembrandt in 1661. He is depicted clothed as a pilgrim, with a scallop shell on his shoulder, and his staff and pilgrim's hat beside him.

In the Catholic tradition, Saint James is the patron saint of Spain and, according to legend, his remains are held in Santiago de Compostela in Galicia. This name Santiago is the local evolution of the Latin genitive Sancti Iacobi, "(church or sanctuary) of Saint James" (evolved into a personal name in Spanish, and also in Portuguese as Tiago which spelled in ancient orthography as Thiago and still commonly used as a proper name, with its derivatives Diego/Diogo). The traditional pilgrimage to the grave of the saint, known as the "Way of St. James", has been the most popular pilgrimage for Western European Catholics from the Early Middle Ages onwards, although its modern revival and popularity stem from Walter Starkie's 1957 book, The Road to Santiago. The Pilgrims of St. James. Officially, 327,378 pilgrims registered in 2018 as having completed the final 100 kilometres (62 mi) walk (200 kilometres (120 mi) by bicycle) to Santiago to qualify for a Compostela. When 25 July falls on a Sunday, it is a "Holy Year" (a Jacobean holy year) and a special east door is opened for entrance into Santiago Cathedral. Jubilee years follow a 6-5-6-11 pattern (except when the last year of a century is not a leap year, which can yield a gap of 7 or 12 years). In the 2004 Holy Year, 179,944 pilgrims were received at Compostela. In the 2010 Holy Year, the number had risen to 272,412. The most recent of such Holy Year was 2021; the next will be 2027.

=== Feast ===
The feast day of St. James is celebrated on 25 July on the liturgical calendars of the Catholic, Eastern Orthodox, True Orthodox, Anglican, Lutheran and certain other Protestant churches. The traditional reason why St. James' feast day is held on the 25th of July is the belief that he was martyred on this date in the year 44 AD. However, some historians argue that July 25th was chosen so as to coincide with the feast day of Saint Christopher.

He is additionally commemorated on 30 April in the Orthodox Christian liturgical calendar (for those churches which follow the traditional Julian Calendar, 30 April currently falls on 13 May of the modern Gregorian Calendar) and on 30 June (Synaxis of the Apostles). The National Day of Galicia is also celebrated on 25 July: St James is its patron saint.

== Jerusalem ==
The site of martyrdom is located within the Armenian Apostolic Cathedral of St. James in the Armenian Quarter of Jerusalem. The Chapel of Saint James the Great, located to the left of the sanctuary, is the traditional place where he was martyred when King Agrippa ordered him to be beheaded (Acts 12:1–2). His head is believed to be buried under the altar, marked by a piece of red marble and surrounded by six votive lamps.

== Spain ==
=== Mission in Hispania and burial at Compostela ===
The 12th century Historia Compostelana commissioned by Diego Gelmírez provides a summary of the legend of St. James, as it was believed at Compostela at that time. Two propositions are central to the legend: first, that James preached the gospel in Hispania as well as in the Holy Land; second, that after his martyrdom at the hands of Herod Agrippa, his followers carried his body by sea to Hispania, where they landed at Padrón on the coast of Galicia, then carried it over land for burial at Santiago de Compostela.

After first going to Sardinia James embarked at Cartagena and started preaching the Gospel in Hispania. According to tradition, St. James passed through various towns in Tarraconensis, including Bracara Augusta where he preached to the local populace and later elevated a fellow Jew by the name of Peter as their local preacher before leaving to continue traveling. According to local tradition, on 2 January AD 40, the Virgin Mary appeared to James on the bank of the Ebro River at Caesaraugusta, while he was preaching the Gospel in Hispania. She appeared upon a pillar, and that pillar is conserved and venerated within the present Basilica of Our Lady of the Pillar, in Zaragoza, Spain. Following that apparition, St. James returned to Judaea, where he was beheaded by Herod Agrippa I in AD 44.

The translation of his relics from Judaea to Galicia in the northwest of Hispania was, in legend, accomplished by a series of miraculous events: his decapitated body was taken up by angels and sailed in a rudderless, unattended boat to Iria Flavia in Hispania, where a massive rock closed around his body. Tradition has it that when the disciples of James, Theodore and Athanasius, arrived in Iria Flavia, they approached Queen Lupa about giving them a place to bury his body. Lupa appears in the Codex Calixtinus which further relates that she decides to trick the disciples and sends them to the governor of Duio with the intent of having them killed. Sensing a trap, they escape the governor and return to the queen. Once again Lupa tries to deceive them and sends them to Pico Sacro (the Sacred Peak) to collect two of her oxen to carry the necessary material to build the tomb. She does not tell them that the mountain has a cave which is the entrance to hell and is guarded by a dragon. However, the presence of the holy cross protects the disciples from harm and tames the bulls. Upon witnessing the miraculous events, Lupa converts to Christianity and helps build the apostle's tomb in Libredon.

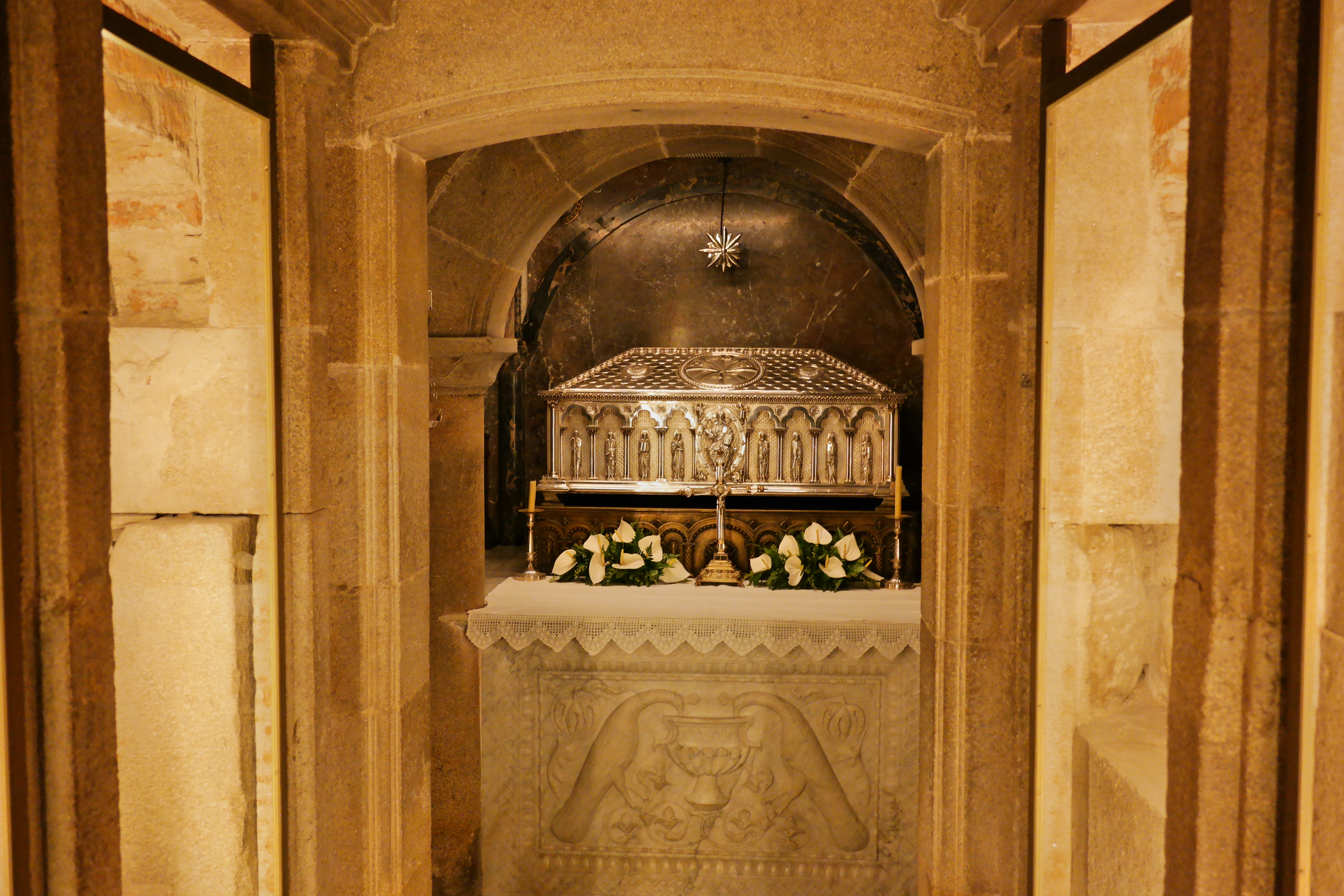
The tomb of St. James the Great, located in the crypt of the Santiago de Compostela Cathedral in Spain

The tradition at Compostela placed the discovery of the relics of the saint in the 9th century, by Pelayo in the Libredon forest in the time of Bishop Theodemir and king Alfonso II. These traditions were the basis for the pilgrimage route that began to be established in the 9th century, and the shrine dedicated to James at Santiago de Compostela became a famous pilgrimage site within the Christian world. The Way of St. James is a network of routes that cross Western Europe and arrive at Santiago de Compostela through northern Spain.

=== Medieval "Santiago Matamoros" legend ===
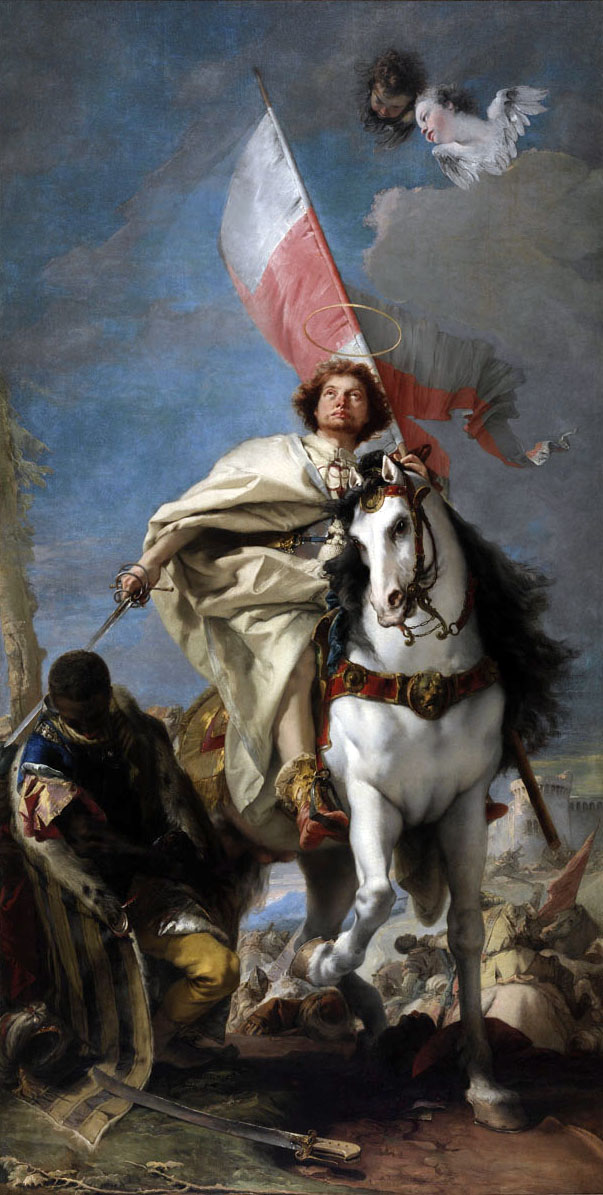
Saint James as the Moor-killer by Giovanni Battista Tiepolo (Museum of Fine Arts, Budapest). His mantle is that of his military order.

An even later tradition states that he miraculously appeared to fight for the Christian army during the legendary battle of Clavijo, and was henceforth called Santiago Matamoros (Saint James the Moor-slayer). ¡Santiago, y cierra, España! ("St. James and strike for Spain") was the traditional battle cry of medieval Spanish (Christian) armies. Miguel de Cervantes has Don Quixote explaining that "the great knight of the russet cross was given by God to Spain as patron and protector".

=== Emblem ===
The Cross of Saint James, the symbol of the Order of Santiago; the hilt is surmounted with a scallop.

James' emblem was the scallop shell (or "cockle shell"), and pilgrims to his shrine often wore that symbol on their hats or clothes. The French term for a scallop is coquille St. Jacques, which means "cockle (or mollusc) of [St.] Jacob". The German word for a scallop is Jakobsmuschel, which means "Jacob's mussel (or clam)"; the Dutch word is Jacobsschelp, meaning "Jacob's shell". In Danish and with the same meaning as in Dutch, the word is Ibskal – Ib being a Danish version of the name "Jakob" and skal meaning "shell".

=== Military Order of Santiago ===
The military Order of Santiago, named after Saint Iago or Saint James, was founded in Spain in the 12th century to fight the Moors. Later, as in other orders of chivalry, the membership became a mark of honor.

== Latter-day Saints ==
The Church of Jesus Christ of Latter-day Saints teaches that in 1829 the Apostles James, Peter and John appeared as heavenly messengers to Joseph Smith and Oliver Cowdery and conferred upon them the Melchizedek priesthood authority of apostolic succession, and thus exclusively on earth to their organization.

According to the teaching, this occurred sometime after May 15, 1829, when John the Baptist similarly appeared to Smith and Cowdery and conferred upon them the Aaronic, or lesser, priesthood, stating that he was doing so under the direction of James, Peter and John.

== In Islam ==
The Quranic account of the disciples of Jesus does not include their names, numbers, or any detailed accounts of their lives. Muslim exegesis, however, more or less agrees with the New Testament list and says that the disciples included Peter, Philip, Thomas, Bartholomew, Matthew, Andrew, James, Jude, John and Simon the Zealot.

== See also ==
- James the Minor
- James the Just
- Apocryphon of James (also known as the Secret Book of James)
- Camino de Santiago
- Cathedral of St. James
- Hand of St James the Apostle
- Military Order of Saint James of the Sword
- Peter of Rates
- Saint James, son of Zebedee, patron saint archive
- James Matamoros
- St. James' Church

== Bibliography ==
- Bruce, F. F. (1964). Commentary on the Book of the Acts. Grand Rapids: Wm. B. Eerdmans.
- Camerlynck, Achille (1910). "St. James the Greater" . In Herbermann, Charles (ed.). Catholic Encyclopedia. Vol. 8. New York: Robert Appleton Company.
- Chadwick, Henry (1976). Priscillian of Avila. Oxford University Press. ISBN 978-0-19-826643-3.
- Cervantes, Miguel de (1863). Don Quixote de la Mancha: A Revised Translation Based on Those of Motteux, Jarvis and Smollett. New York: D. Appleton.
- Fletcher, Richard A. (1984), Saint James's Catapult: The Life and Times of Diego Gelmírez of Santiago de Compostela, Oxford: Clarendon, ISBN 978-0-19-822581-2
- Kendrick, Thomas Downing (1960). St. James in Spain. Methuen.
- Nixon, R. E. (1963). "Boanerges". In J. D. Douglas (ed.). The New Bible Dictionary. London: Inter-Varsity. p. 596.
- Noegel, Scott B.; Wheeler, Brandon M. (2003). Historical Dictionary of Prophets in Islam and Judaism. Lanham, MD: Scarecrow. ISBN 978-0810843059.
- Starkie, Walter (1957). The Road to Santiago. The Pilgrims of St. James. New York: E. P. Dutton. OCLC 28087235.

=== Further reading ===
- Barreiro, Santiago (2019). "Pilgrims from the land of sagas: Jacobean devotion in medieval Iceland". Journal of Medieval Iberian Studies. 12 (1): 70–83. doi:10.1080/17546559.2019.1705373. hdl:11336/119000. ISSN 1754-6559. S2CID 214208796.
- Starkie, Walter (1958). El camino de Santiago: las peregrinaciones al sepulcro del Apóstol (in Spanish). Translated by Amando Lázaro Ros. Madrid: Aguilar. OCLC 432856567.
- Starkie, Walter (1965). The Road to Santiago. The Pilgrims of St. James. Univ. of California Press. OCLC 477436336.
- Van Herwaarden, Jan (1 January 1980). "The origins of the cult of St James of Compostela". Journal of Medieval History 6 (1): 1–35.
