= Pilgrims' way =

Pilgrimage route

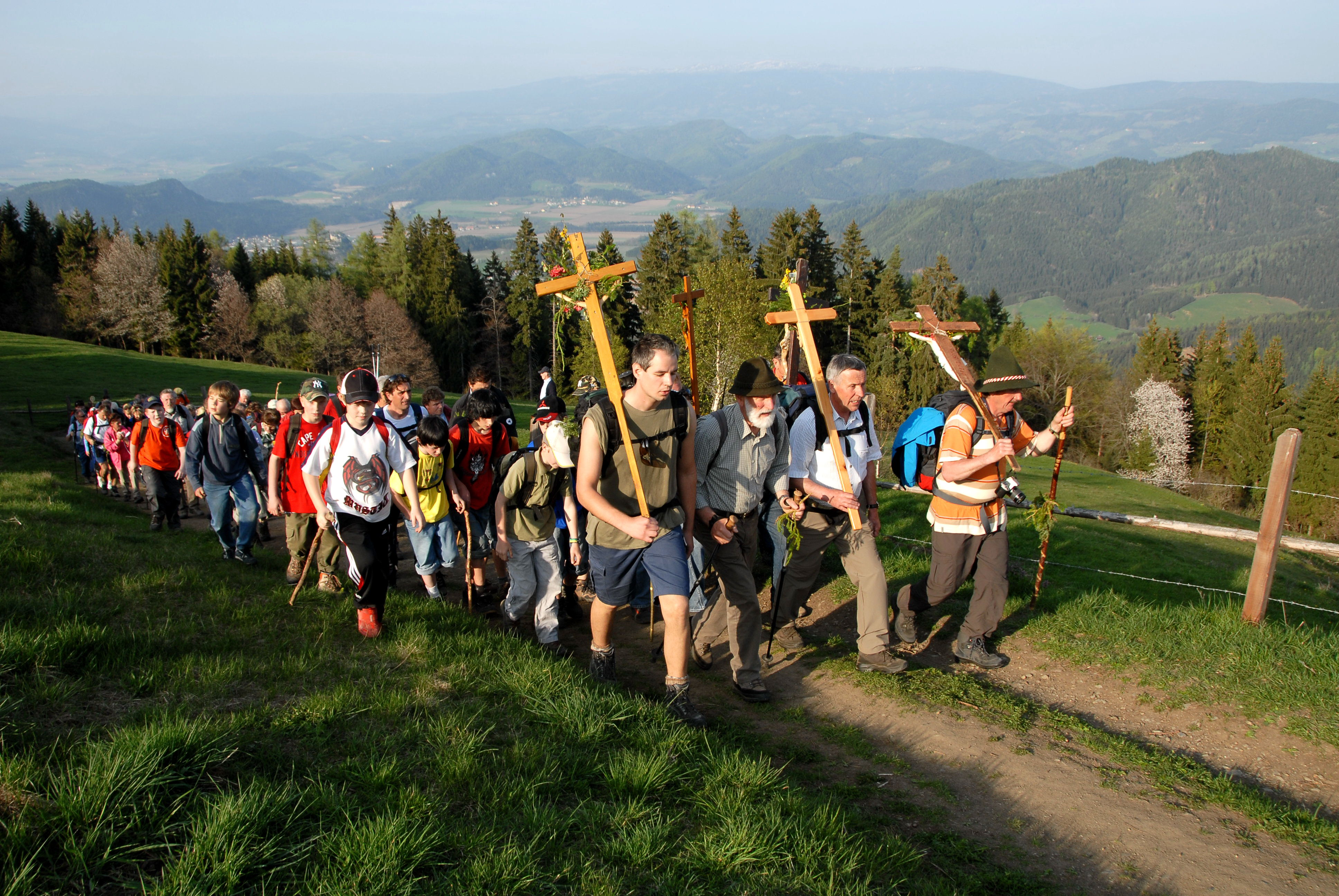
A pilgrim procession in Carinthia in Austria

A pilgrims' way or pilgrim way is a standard route that pilgrims take when they go on a pilgrimage in order to reach their destination – usually a holy site or place of worship. These sites may be towns or cities of special significance such as Jerusalem, Rome, Santiago de Compostela, Fátima, Lourdes or Einsiedeln, but may also be specific points in the countryside, such as a hill, spring, well, cave or shrine. On the route there are stations where pilgrims can stop and rest, where prayers may be said or religious services observed.

== History ==
In the Middle Ages there were three main Christian pilgrimage sites: Jerusalem, Rome and Santiago de Compostela in Spain. The large pilgrimage sites were often the graves of important apostles. The most famous pilgrims' way today is the one to Santiago de Compostela in Spain, also known as the Way of St. James. Another very old pilgrim way, the Via Francigena, runs from Canterbury in England through France and Switzerland to Rome.

These routes were also linked to Jerusalem via the Jerusalem Way. For example, individual sections may be viewed by as the Way of St. James, as well as a pilgrim way to another place. Together with the various approach paths, these main routes form a network of old pilgrim routes that cross the whole of Europe. Today there are St. James societies in almost all European countries that are dedicated to the research and maintenance of the Way of St. James. In Germany the historical pilgrim ways are researched by the German St. James Society (Deutsche St. Jakobus-Gesellschaft). In Switzerland this is carried out by the Union of the Friends of the Way of St. James (Vereinigung der Freunde des Jakobsweges).

Because Christians understand themselves to be always "on a journey", parish and diocesan development concepts are often described as pilgrimages or pilgrim ways. One well-known such example is the so-called Pilgrimage of Trust on Earth of the ecumenical Taizé Community. The Evangelical-Lutheran Church of Hanover has developed a project with the name "Loccum–Volkenroda Pilgrims' Way". In 1987 during the Olof Palme Peace March, on the instigation of the Action Reconciliation Service for Peace, a multi-day pilgrimage was made along a pilgrim way from Ravensbrück concentration camp to Sachsenhausen concentration camp. The route recalled the death marches of 1945.

== See also ==
- St. Olavsleden
- Pilgrim's Route
- Pilgrimage to Chartres

== Literature ==
- Betz, Helmut; Waldau, Knut (2009), Der Erde nah – dem Himmel entgegen. Ein Pilgerführer für die Alpen (in German), München: Kösel-Verlag, ISBN 978-3-466-36849-5
- Kupčík, Ivan (1992), "Karten der Pilgerstrassen im Bereich der heutigen Schweiz und des angrenzenden Auslandes vom 13. bis zum 16. Jahrhundert", Cartographica Helvetica (in German), vol. 6, no. 2, pp. 17–28
- Lienau, Detlef (2009), Sich fremd gehen. Warum Menschen pilgern (in German), Ostfildern: Matthias-Grünewald-Verlag, ISBN 978-3-7867-2757-6
- Störig, Mario, Ein sehr schön geschriebener Erfahrungsbericht von Mario Störig (in German)
