= Kälarne =

- Location within Jämtland Location within Sweden
- Coordinates: 62°59′N 16°05′E
- Country: Sweden
- Province: Jämtland
- County: Jämtland County
- Municipality: Bräcke Municipality

Area
  - Total: 1.45 km^{2} (0.56 sq mi)

Population (31 December 2010)
  - Total: 451
  - Density: 312/km^{2} (810/sq mi)
- Time zone: UTC+1 (CET)
  - Summer (DST): UTC+2 (CEST)

Kälarne is a locality situated in Bräcke Municipality, Jämtland County, Sweden with 451 inhabitants in 2010.
