= Ivan Kupčík =

Czech cartography historian (1943-2022)

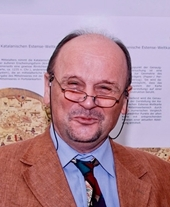
Kupčík in 2007

Ivan Kupčík (1 April 1943 – 3 March 2022) was a Czech historian of cartography.

Ivan Kupčík was born in Pardubice and studied geography at the Charles University in Prague. After his graduation in 1973, he worked at the Institute of Geography tied to the Czechoslovak Academy of Sciences. He was also employed at the State Map Collection in Prague. In 1980, he immigrated to West Germany and settled down in Munich, where he worked at the Bayerisches Hauptstaatsarchiv and the Deutsches Museum. From 1993, he was furthermore assistant lecturer in the history of cartography at LMU Munich. He retired in 2006, and spent the last two years in a nursing home outside Prague.

Ivan Kupčík was an expert in thematic historical maps such as portolan charts and especially pilgrimage maps. Some years before his death, he donated his personal collection of cartographic material to the Charles University.

He married Jana Valterová in 1964; the couple had two sons. After his move to Germany, he formed a new relationship with his colleague Inge Barbara Linke.
