= Bräcke Municipality =

Bräcke Municipality Bräcke kommun
- Municipality
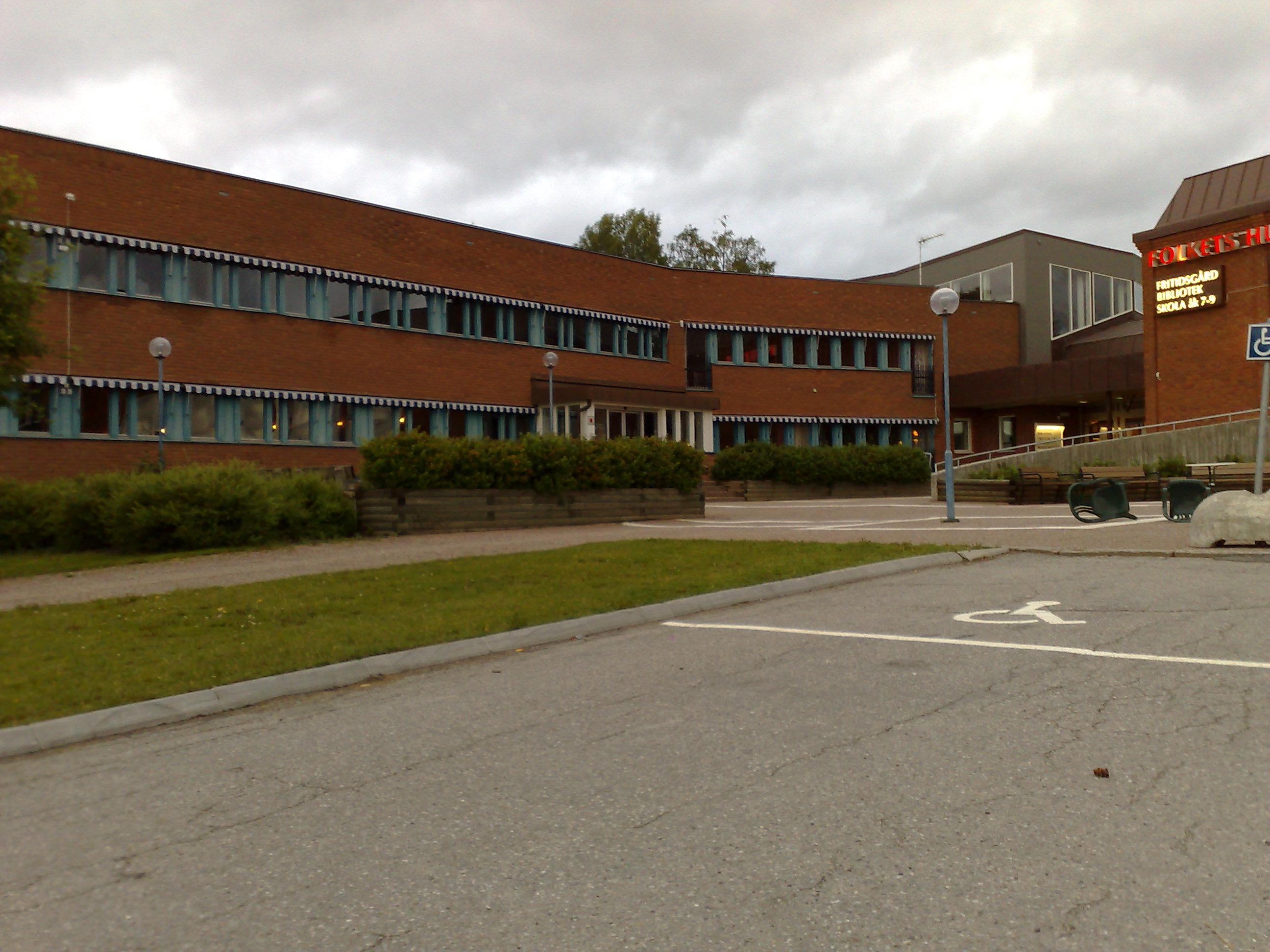
- Bräcke town hall

- Flag Coat of arms

- Coordinates: 62°45′N 15°25′E
- Country: Sweden
- County: Jämtland County
- Seat: Bräcke

Area
  - Total: 3,783.7 km^{2} (1,460.9 sq mi)
  - Land: 3,408.2 km^{2} (1,315.9 sq mi)
  - Water: 375.5 km^{2} (145.0 sq mi)
- Area as of 1 January 2014.

Population (30 June 2025)
  - Total: 6,032
  - Density: 1.770/km^{2} (4.584/sq mi)
- Time zone: UTC+1 (CET)
  - Summer (DST): UTC+2 (CEST)
- ISO 3166 code: SE
- Province: Jämtland
- Municipal code: 2305
- Website: www.bracke.se

Bräcke Municipality (Swedish: Bräcke kommun) is a municipality in Jämtland County in northern Sweden. Its seat is located in Bräcke.

The present municipality was formed in 1974 when "old" Bräcke Municipality was amalgamated with Kälarne and Revsund. The three former municipalities had been created in 1952. The number of original entities (as of 1863) were six. Due to the declining population in the area further amalgamations have been proposed, but rejected.

== Localities ==
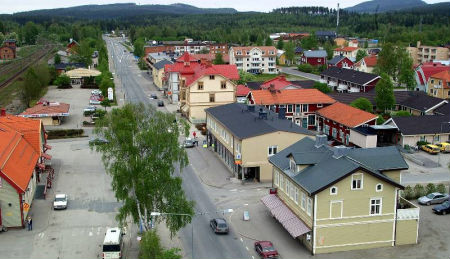
Central Bräcke.

There are four localities (or urban areas) in Bräcke Municipality:

#	Locality	Population
1	**Bräcke**	1,566
2	Gällö	758
3	Kälarne	492
4	Pilgrimstad	405

The municipal seat in bold

== Demographics ==
This is a demographic table based on Bräcke Municipality's electoral districts in the 2022 Swedish general election sourced from SVT's election platform, in turn taken from SCB official statistics.

In total there were 6,167 residents, including 4,820 Swedish citizens of voting age. 52.1% voted for the left coalition and 46.7% for the right coalition. Indicators are in percentage points except population totals and income.

Location	Residents	Citizen adults	Left vote	Right vote	Employed	Swedish parents	Foreign heritage	Income SEK	Degree
Location			%	%					
Bräcke-Bodsjö	2,475	1,943	52.6	46.2	76	83	17	20,985	23
Gällö-Sundsjö	2,494	1,890	51.4	47.2	80	87	13	23,615	29
Kälarne	1,198	987	53.7	45.1	78	90	10	21,431	22
Source: SVT

== Villages ==
- Albacken
- Bensjö
- Fanbyn
- Gimdalen
- Hunge
- Nyhem
- Rissna
- Stavre
- Sundsjö
- Sörbygden
- Västanede

== Notable people ==
One of the most famous people coming from Bräcke Municipality is the former middle distance runner and world record holder Gunder Hägg, who was born in the village Albacken outside of the town Bräcke.
