= Pilgrimstad =

- Location within Jämtland Location within Sweden
- Coordinates: 62°57′N 15°02′E
- Country: Sweden
- Province: Jämtland
- County: Jämtland County
- Municipality: Bräcke Municipality

Area
  - Total: 0.63 km^{2} (0.24 sq mi)

Population (31 December 2010)
  - Total: 386
  - Density: 611/km^{2} (1,580/sq mi)
- Time zone: UTC+1 (CET)
  - Summer (DST): UTC+2 (CEST)

Pilgrimstad is a locality situated in Bräcke Municipality, Jämtland County, Sweden with 386 inhabitants in 2010.

It is mostly known for the small micro-brewery, Jämtlands Bryggeri that is located in the village.

Historically, Pilgrimstad has an old history. The village is named after a water well where pilgrims stopped on their pilgrimage travels to Trondheim, Norway. Yet to this day, the inhabitants of the village get their water from this well.
