= Bräcke =

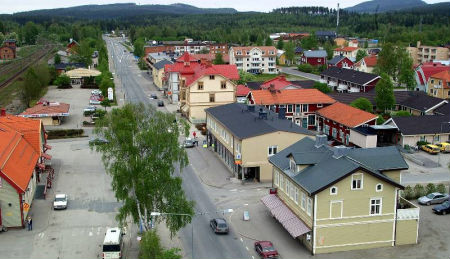
- Central Bräcke

- Location within Jämtland Location within Sweden
- Coordinates: 62°45′N 15°25′E
- Country: Sweden
- Province: Jämtland
- County: Jämtland County
- Municipality: Bräcke Municipality

Area
  - Total: 2.0 km^{2} (0.77 sq mi)

Population (31 December 2010)
  - Total: 1,651
  - Density: 825/km^{2} (2,140/sq mi)
- Time zone: UTC+1 (CET)
  - Summer (DST): UTC+2 (CEST)

Bräcke is a locality and the seat of Bräcke Municipality in Jämtland County, Sweden with 1,651 inhabitants as of 2010.

The community is located next to Lake Revsundssjön, 70 km south-east of Östersund. The railway has been an important factor in Bräcke's development. The town is located along the Central line and serves as the starting point of the Main Line Through Upper Norrland. European route E14 also passes through Bräcke and Länsväg 323 starts in Bräcke and goes towards Kälarne.

Bräcke Church (Bräcke kyrka) was built in the summer of 1859 following a drawing by Abraham Rafael Ulric Pettersson (1824-1866). The church building is externally clad with white painted wooden paneling. The ceiling of the church room has a thin vault of wood. The altarpiece was painted in 1926 by Stockholm artist Karl Tirén (1869-1955). In the church tower hang two bells; the little bell was cast in 1778 and large bell was cast in 1859.

== Climate ==
Bräcke has a subarctic climate influenced by its interior elevated plateau position transitioning between the coastal and mountainous regions of Norrland. This renders a variable climate prone to summer frosts. The annual temperature is usually just above 2 °C (36 °F). Compared to Torpshammar not far to its east, Bräcke is relatively cold due to the elevation difference. Being in a relative rain shadow from the Scandinavian Mountains, winter snow packs are usually moderate.

Climate data for Hunge, 20 km west of Bräcke; (2002–2020 averages; extremes since 1961)
Month	Jan	Feb	Mar	Apr	May	Jun	Jul	Aug	Sep	Oct	Nov	Dec	Year
Record high °C (°F)	9.5 (49.1)	9.6 (49.3)	14.9 (58.8)	21.4 (70.5)	26.6 (79.9)	30.4 (86.7)	30.6 (87.1)	31.1 (88.0)	23.8 (74.8)	18.9 (66.0)	12.7 (54.9)	8.9 (48.0)	31.1 (88.0)
Mean maximum °C (°F)	4.2 (39.6)	4.9 (40.8)	8.7 (47.7)	15.6 (60.1)	22.6 (72.7)	25.2 (77.4)	26.7 (80.1)	24.7 (76.5)	19.7 (67.5)	12.8 (55.0)	7.7 (45.9)	5.1 (41.2)	28.0 (82.4)
Mean daily maximum °C (°F)	−3.5 (25.7)	−2.3 (27.9)	1.8 (35.2)	7.7 (45.9)	13.4 (56.1)	17.6 (63.7)	20.3 (68.5)	18.4 (65.1)	13.4 (56.1)	6.4 (43.5)	1.0 (33.8)	−2.0 (28.4)	7.7 (45.8)
Daily mean °C (°F)	−8.0 (17.6)	−7.1 (19.2)	−3.6 (25.5)	2.3 (36.1)	7.6 (45.7)	12.1 (53.8)	14.8 (58.6)	13.3 (55.9)	8.8 (47.8)	2.8 (37.0)	−2.4 (27.7)	−6.2 (20.8)	2.9 (37.1)
Mean daily minimum °C (°F)	−12.5 (9.5)	−11.8 (10.8)	−8.9 (16.0)	−3.2 (26.2)	1.8 (35.2)	6.6 (43.9)	9.3 (48.7)	8.2 (46.8)	4.2 (39.6)	−0.8 (30.6)	−5.7 (21.7)	−10.3 (13.5)	−1.9 (28.5)
Mean minimum °C (°F)	−26.9 (−16.4)	−26.7 (−16.1)	−23.4 (−10.1)	−11.8 (10.8)	−5.2 (22.6)	0.0 (32.0)	2.4 (36.3)	0.9 (33.6)	−2.7 (27.1)	−9.4 (15.1)	−17.0 (1.4)	−23.3 (−9.9)	−30.8 (−23.4)
Record low °C (°F)	−42.1 (−43.8)	−38.1 (−36.6)	−35.0 (−31.0)	−21.9 (−7.4)	−12.2 (10.0)	−2.8 (27.0)	−2.1 (28.2)	−1.6 (29.1)	−7.4 (18.7)	−20.5 (−4.9)	−28.4 (−19.1)	−40.1 (−40.2)	−42.1 (−43.8)
Average precipitation mm (inches)	34.1 (1.34)	21.9 (0.86)	23.5 (0.93)	24.5 (0.96)	48.2 (1.90)	66.9 (2.63)	81.5 (3.21)	73.6 (2.90)	53.5 (2.11)	45.5 (1.79)	36.7 (1.44)	38.4 (1.51)	548.3 (21.58)
Source 1: SMHI Open Data
Source 2: SMHI Open Data

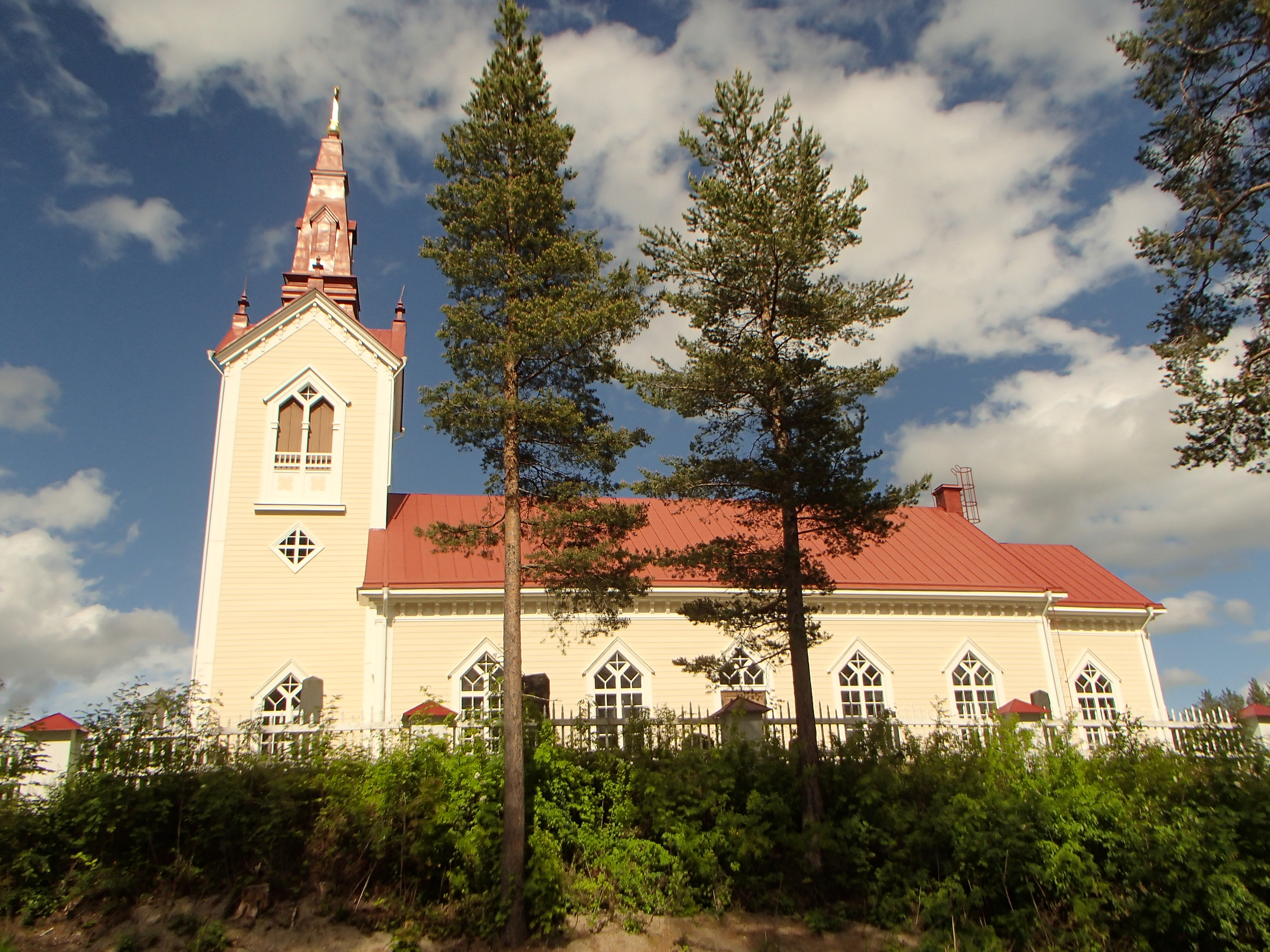
Bräcke Church
