= Libredón =

Legendary forest in Galicia, Spain

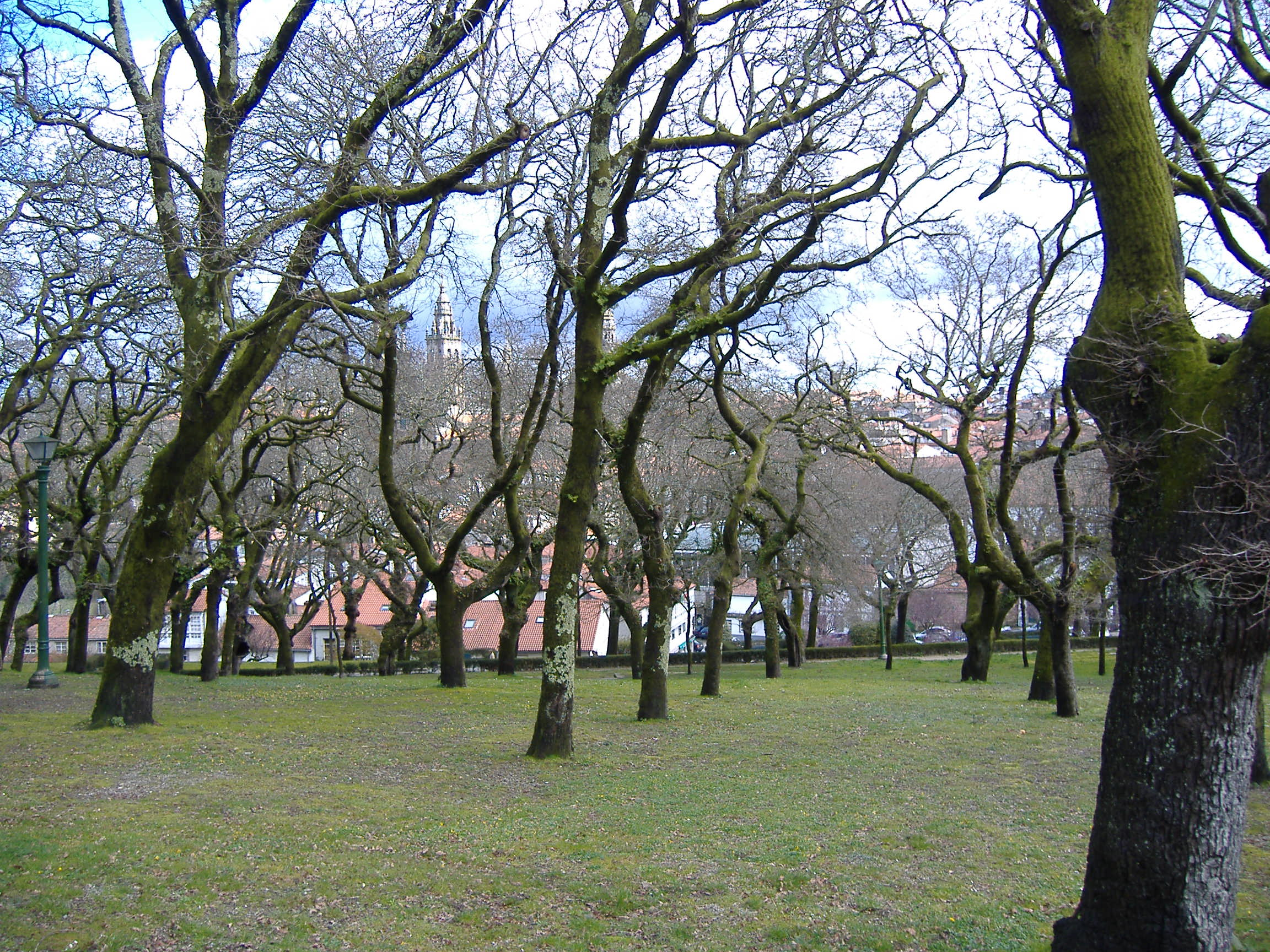
The Oak grove of Santa Susana may be the site of the Libredón

Libredón was a forest, sometimes also described as a mountain, near Santiago de Compostela that according to legend, is where the body of Saint James was laid to rest. There is a belief that the forest was located at the Oak grove of Santa Susana, a hill in Santiago de Compostela that is part of the Parque da Alameda de Santiago de Compostela.

== Background ==
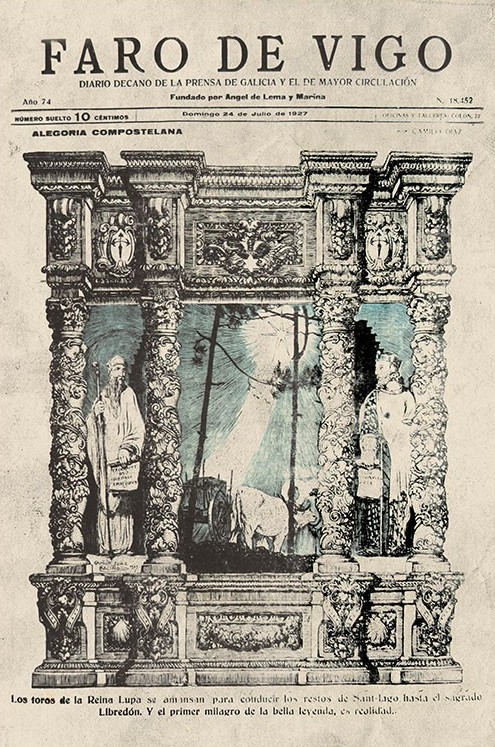
Faro de Vigo from 24 July 1927. Story by Camilo Díaz Baliño on National Day of Galicia. Queen Lupa's bulls lead the remains of Saint James to the sacred Libredón.

The legend surrounding the life of the apostle says that Saint James preached the gospel in Hispania as well as in the Holy Land; after returning to Israel he was martyred at the orders of Herod Agrippa. His disciples carried his body by sea to Hispania, where they landed at Padrón on the coast of Galicia.

In 1139, in Book III: Transfer of the body to Santiago in the Codex Calixtinus, describes the journey of Theodore and Athanasius, the disciples of Saint James, as they moved his body from Padrón in a cart pulled by oxen to the Libredón forest (previously Liberum Donum), where he was buried. The journey is also described in stories involving Queen Lupa.

The place was forgotten until, in the 9th century, Pelagius the Hermit saw some lights that illuminated the forest. He advised Theodemir, bishop of Iria Flavia. They found a small chapel with an altar and a crypt (the Arca Marmarica) in which there were three tombs, that of Santiago and that of his two disciples. He informed the king of Galicia, Alfonso the Chaste, who traveled from Oviedo along what is called the Camino Primitivo, to verify that the bones corresponded to those of the apostle. King Alfonso II ordered the construction of a chapel on the site.

Traditionally, it is believed that the location of the forest is where the Oak grove of Santa Susana is located, a hill in Santiago de Compostela that is part of the Parque da Alameda de Santiago de Compostela, between Paseo da Alameda and Paseo da Ferradura.

== See also ==
- Camino de Santiago
- Discovery of the tomb of the Saint James
- Pico Sacro
