= Theodemir of Iria =

Spanish bishop

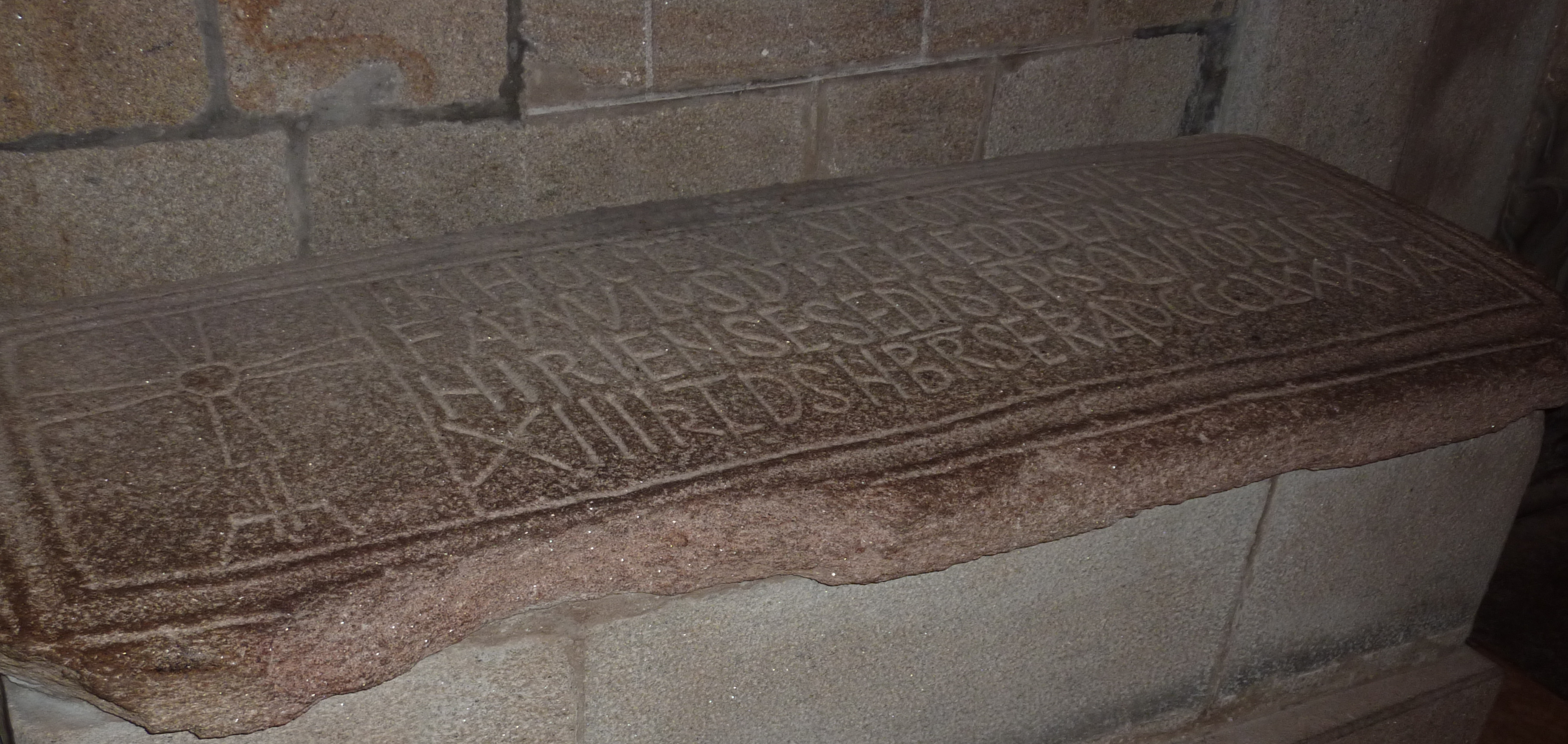
Tombstone of the sepulcher of bishop Theodemar of Iria, now in the Cathedral of Santiago de Compostela

Theodemir or Theodomar (Galician and Spanish: Teodomiro; died 847), was a bishop of Iria, in Galicia.

== Background ==
At some point between year 818, when Bishop Quendulf was still alive, and 842 when king Alfonso II of Asturias died, Pelagius the Hermit saw mysterious lights, like a shower of stars, on the same hill in the forest near Libredon every night. He went and reported the phenomenon to Bishop Theodemir.

On July 25, 812, Theodemir gathered a small entourage and went to Libredon to see the phenomenon for himself. There, in the dense vegetation, they discovered a stone sepulchre in which rested the corpses of three men, who were immediately identified as the Apostle James the Great and two of his disciples, Theodore and Athanasius. Theodemir believed that this was in line with the Breviary of the Apostles, which taught that James was buried in an ark in Marmarica (arca marmarica), probably an ark from Marmarica, Ancient Libya. But he said "arca de mármol" or an ark of marble was meant.

In August 2024, a team of the Norwegian University of Science and Technology concluded that the bones found under the floor of the Cathedral of Santiago de Compostela in 1955 are those of Bishop Theodemir with 98% certainty.”

His Mtdna was: T2b9, possibly of Suebi origin.

FTDNA has added Bishop Theodomir of Iria Flavia to their Notable Connections collection. They have him as: R-M269>DF27>Z195>BY3268

Furthermore, Pérez-Ramallo et al. (2024) stated that "whole genome sequencing revealed a significant North African contribution" to Theodemir's ancestry, "which could correspond to a Roman North African ancestry or more recent Al-Andalus admixture."
