= Camino de Santiago =

Pilgrimage routes to Santiago de Compostela, Spain

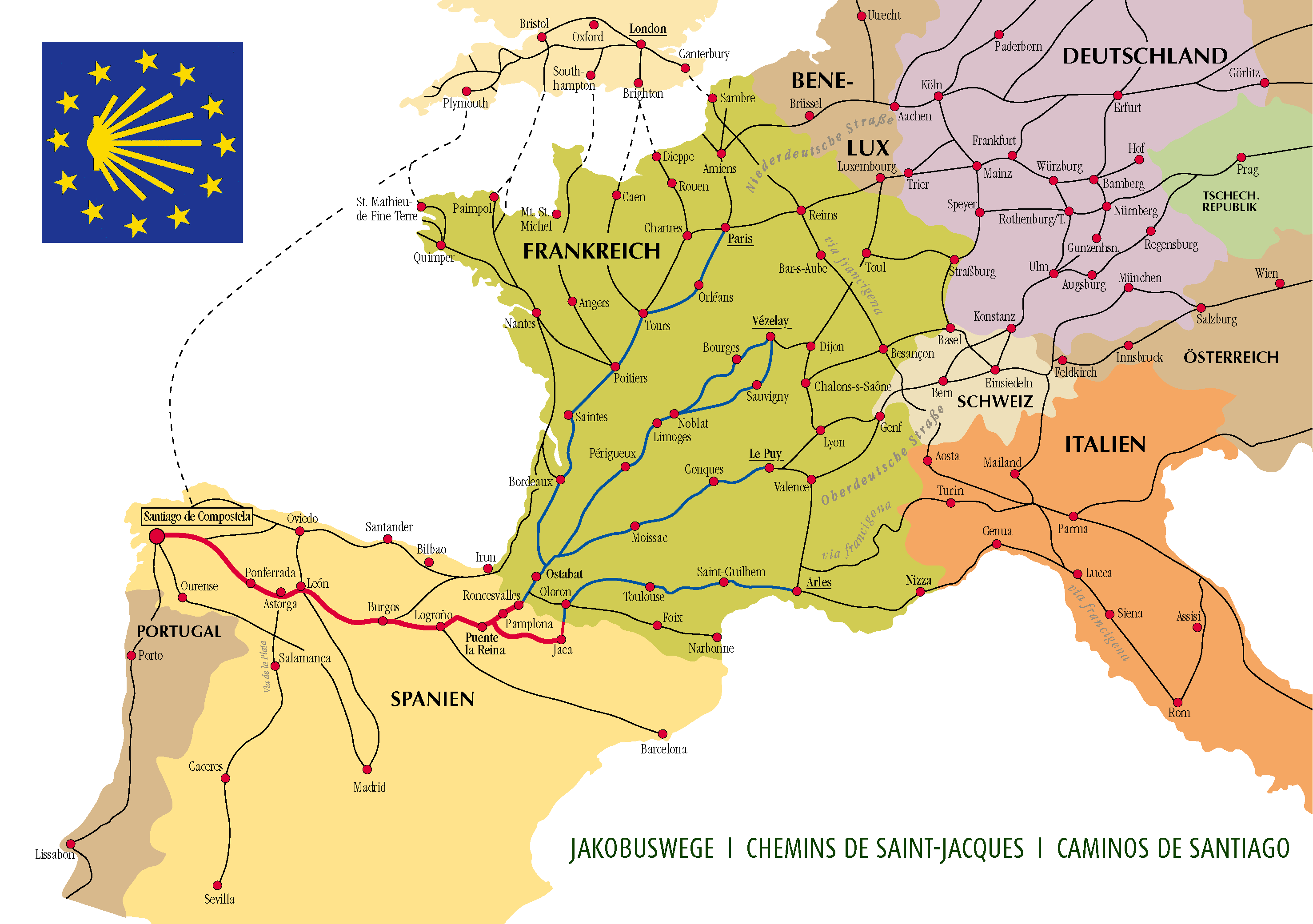
- Map of the Way of St. James in Europe
- Interactive map of Camino de Santiago
- Type: Pilgrims' way

UNESCO World Heritage Site
- Official name: Routes of Santiago de Compostela: Camino Francés and Routes of Northern Spain
- Criteria: Cultural: (ii)(iv)(vi)
- Reference: 669bis
- Inscription: 1993 (17th Session)
- Extensions: 2018
- Buffer zone: 16,286 ha (62.88 sq mi)

UNESCO World Heritage Site
- Official name: Routes of Santiago de Compostela in France
- Criteria: Cultural: (ii)(iv)(vi)
- Reference: 868
- Inscription: 1998 (22nd Session)
- Area: 97.21 ha (0.3753 sq mi)

The Camino de Santiago (Latin: Peregrinatio Compostellana, lit. 'Pilgrimage of Compostela'; Galician: O Camiño de Santiago; Spanish: El Camino de Santiago; Portuguese: O Caminho de Santiago), or the Way of St. James in English, is a network of pilgrims' ways or pilgrimages leading to the shrine of the apostle James in the cathedral of Santiago de Compostela in Galicia in northwestern Spain, where tradition holds that the remains of the apostle are buried. Pilgrims follow its routes as a form of spiritual path or retreat for their spiritual growth. It is also popular with hikers, cyclists, and organized tour groups.

Created and established in the beginning of the 9th century following the discovery of the relics of Saint James the Great, the Way of St. James became a major pilgrimage route of medieval Christianity from the 10th century onwards. Following the end of the Granada War in 1492, under the reign of the Catholic Monarchs Ferdinand II of Aragon and Isabella I of Castile, Pope Alexander VI officially declared the Camino de Santiago to be one of the "three great pilgrimages of Christendom", along with Jerusalem and the Via Francigena to Rome.

In 1987, the Camino, which encompasses several routes in Spain, France, and Portugal, was declared the first Cultural Route of the Council of Europe. Since 2013, the Camino has attracted more than 200,000 pilgrims each year, with an annual growth rate of more than 10 percent. Pilgrims come mainly on foot and often from nearby cities, requiring several days of walking to reach Santiago. The French Way gathers two-thirds of the walkers, but other minor routes are experiencing a growth in popularity. The French Way and the Northern routes in Spain were inscribed on the UNESCO World Heritage List, followed by the routes in France in 1998, because of their historical significance for Christianity as a major pilgrimage route and their testimony to the exchange of ideas and cultures across the routes.

== Major Christian pilgrimage route ==
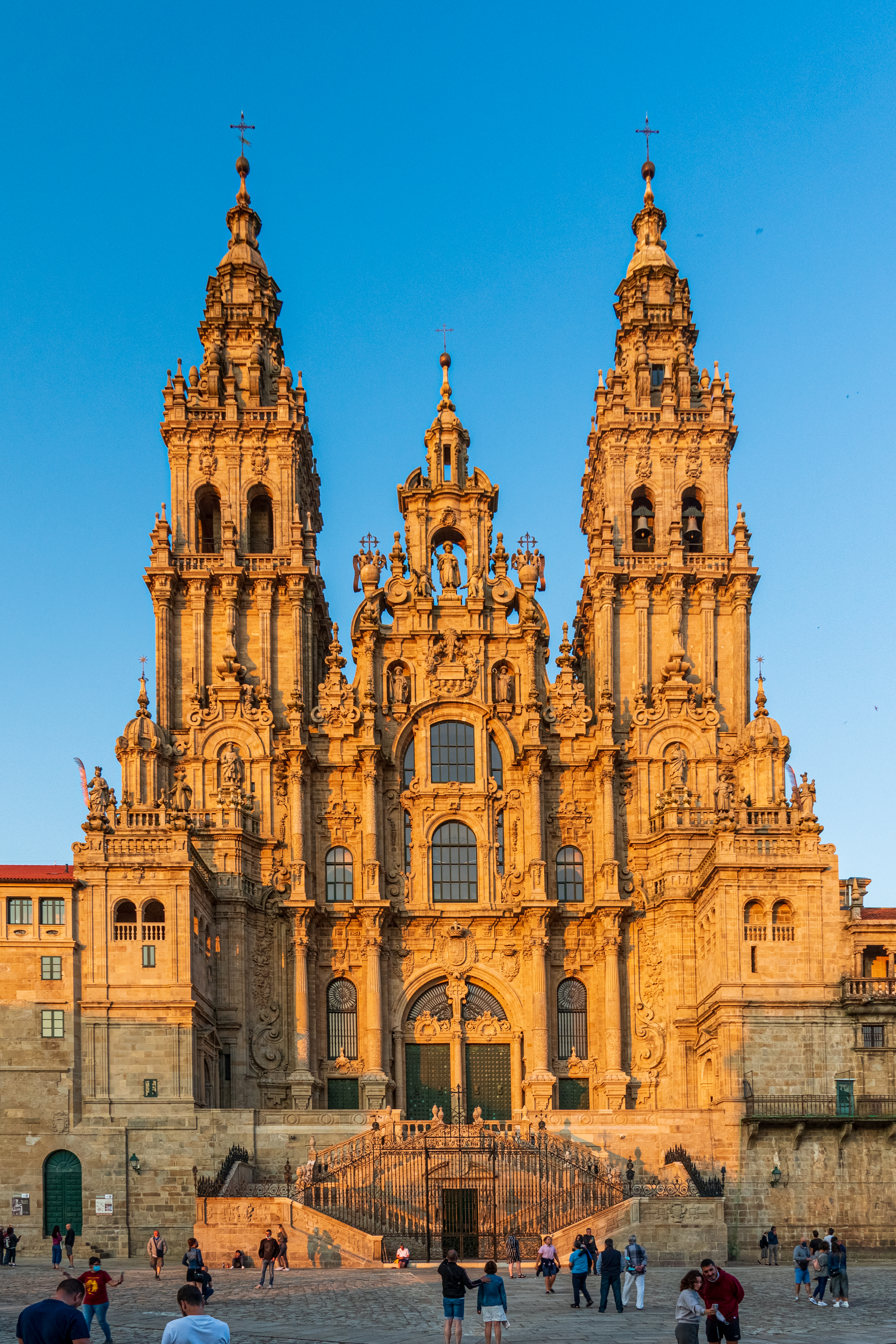
The Cathedral of Santiago de Compostela

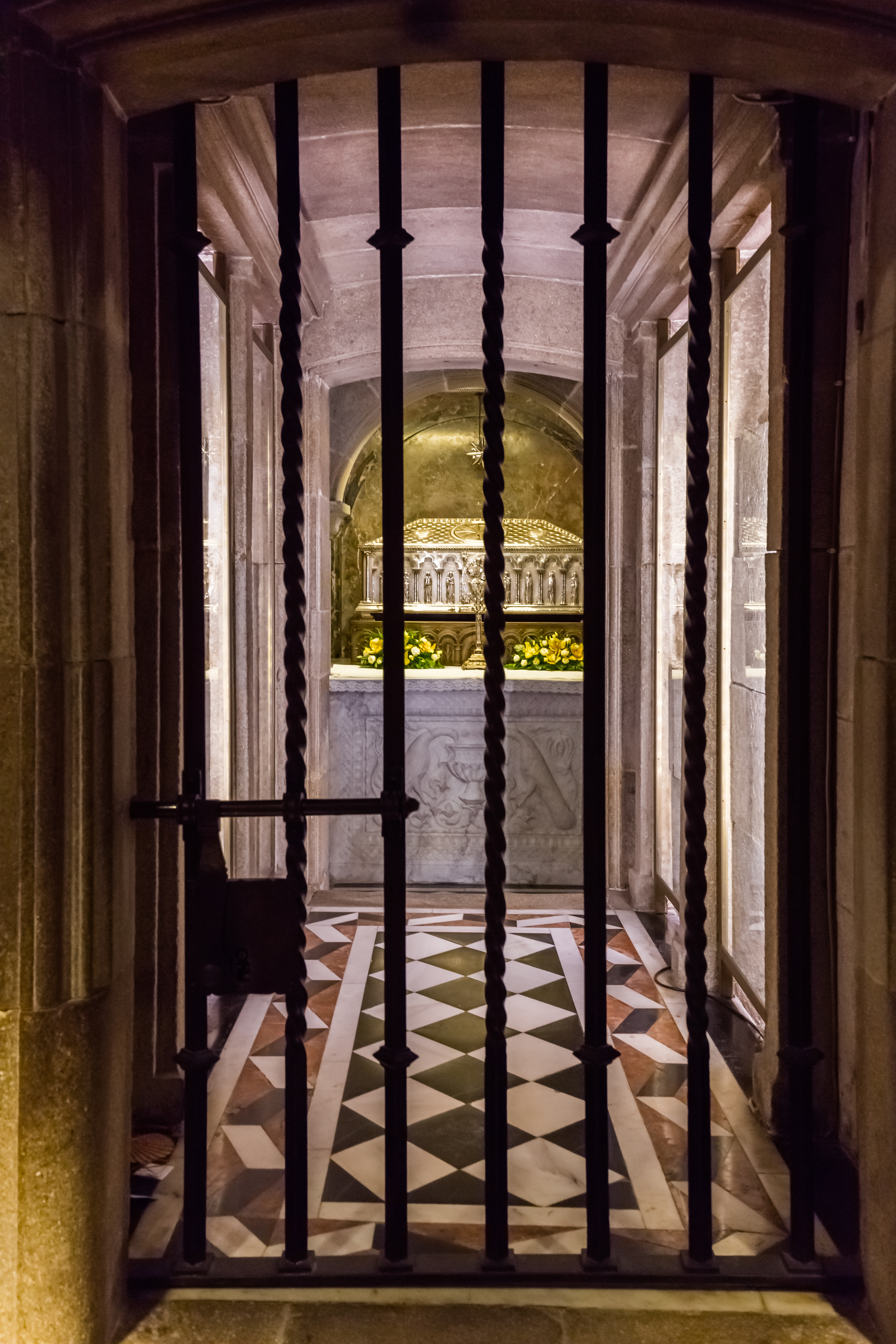
The reliquary of Saint James in the Cathedral of Santiago

The Way of St. James was one of the most important Christian pilgrimages during the later Middle Ages, and a pilgrimage route on which a plenary indulgence could be earned; other major pilgrimage routes include the Via Francigena to Rome and the pilgrimage to Jerusalem. Legend holds that St James's remains were carried by boat from Jerusalem to northern Spain, where he was buried in what is now the city of Santiago de Compostela (according to Spanish legends, Saint James had spent time preaching the gospel in Spain, but returned to Judaea upon seeing a vision of the Virgin Mary on the bank of the Ebro River).

Pilgrims on the Way can take one of dozens of pilgrimage routes to Santiago de Compostela. Traditionally, as with most pilgrimages, the Way of Saint James begins at one's home and ends at the pilgrimage site. However, a few of the routes are considered main ones. During the Middle Ages, the route was highly travelled. However, the Black Death, the Protestant Reformation, and political unrest in 16th-century Europe led to its decline.

Whenever St James's Day (25 July) falls on a Sunday, the cathedral declares a Holy Year (not to be confused with a Jubilee Year which is celebrated every 25 or 50 years, with extraordinary jubilees in addition depending on need). Depending on leap years, Holy Years occur in 5-, 6-, and 11-year intervals. The most recent were 1993, 1999, 2004, 2010 and 2021. The next will be in 2027.

== History ==
=== Pre-Christian history ===
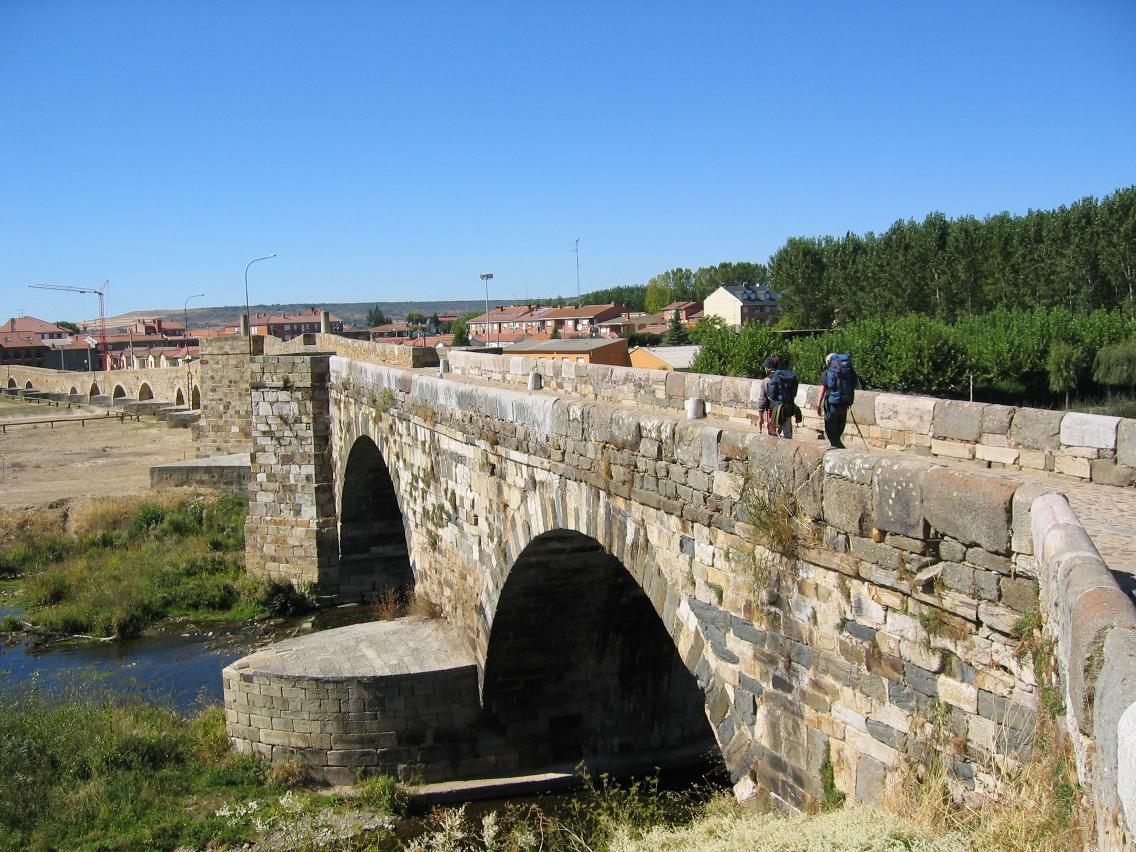
Roman bridge with 19 arches over the river Órbigo. The bridge has been integrated into the modern Camino Francés.

The main pilgrimage route to Santiago follows an earlier Roman trade route, which continues to the Atlantic coast of Galicia, ending at Cape Finisterre. Although it is known today that Cape Finisterre, Spain's westernmost point, is not the westernmost point of Europe (Cabo da Roca in Portugal is farther west), the fact that the Romans called it Finisterrae (literally the end of the world or Land's End in Latin) indicates that they viewed it as such. At night, the Milky Way overhead seems to point the way, so the route acquired the nickname "Voie lactée" – the Milky Way in French.

=== Scallop symbol ===
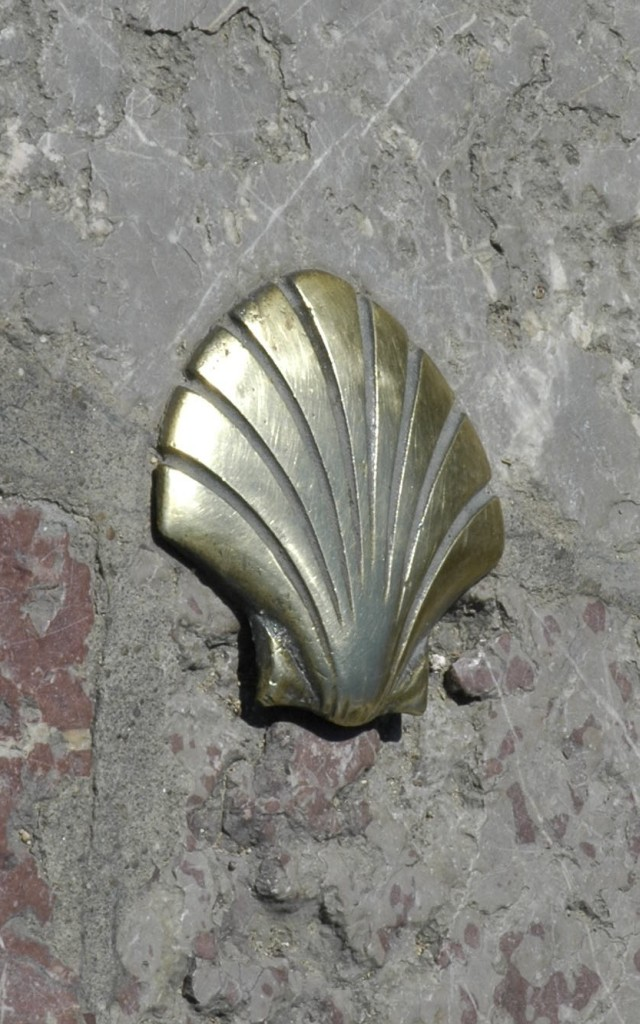
St. James's shell, a symbol of the route, on a wall in León, Spain

A stylised scallop shell, the modern sign post of the Way

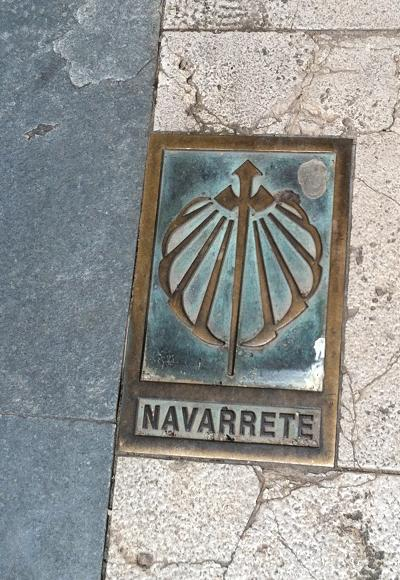
A marker indicating the route of the Way of St. James

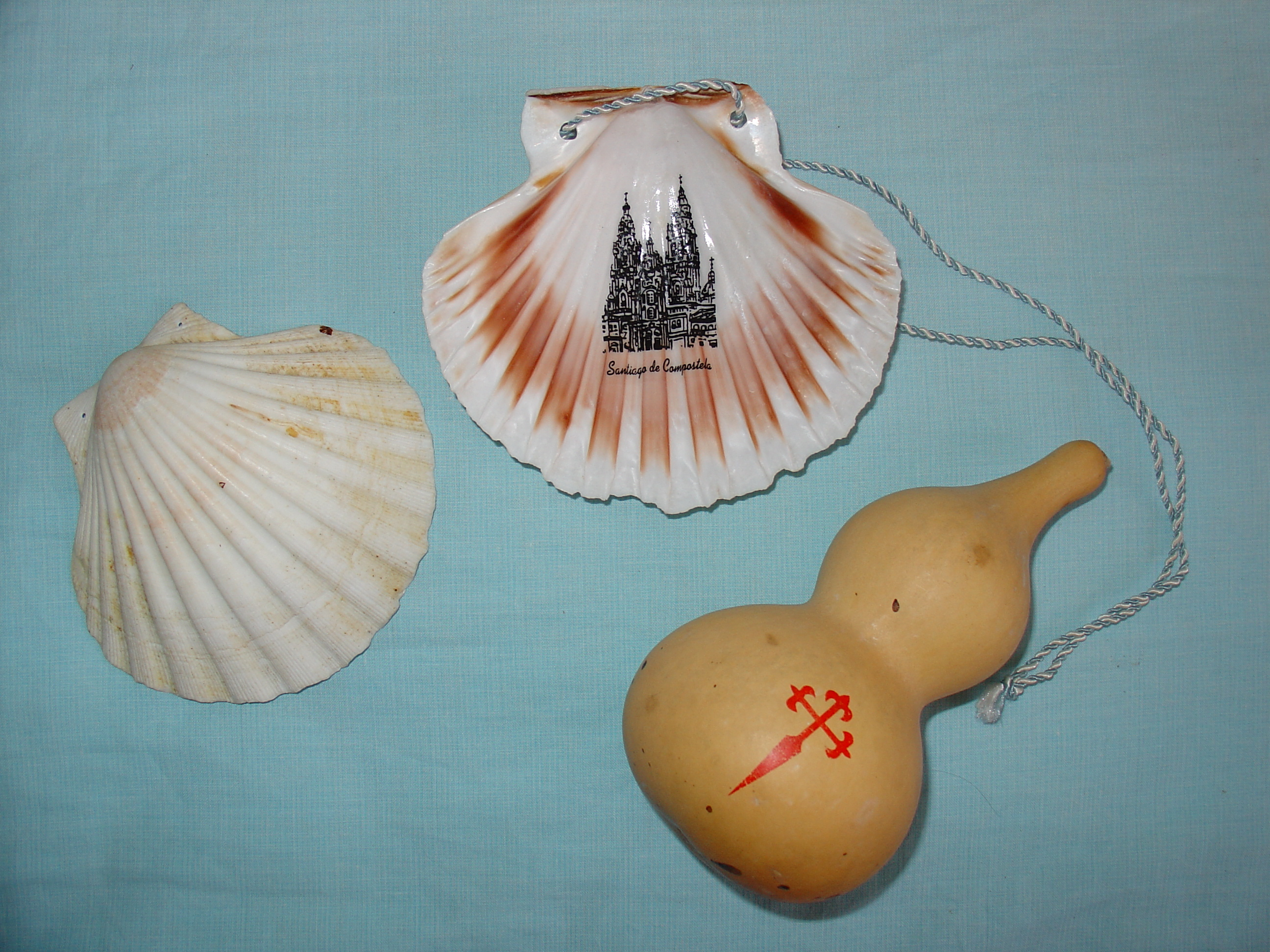
Traditional St James pilgrim accessories

The scallop shell, often found on the shores in Galicia, has long been the symbol of the Camino de Santiago. Over the centuries the scallop shell has taken on a variety of meanings, metaphorical, practical, and mythical, even if its relevance may have actually derived from the desire of pilgrims to take home a souvenir.

One myth says that after James's death, his body was transported by a ship piloted by an angel, back to the Iberian Peninsula to be buried in what is now Libredón. As the ship approached land, the wedding of the daughter of Queen Lupa was taking place on shore. The young groom was on horseback, and, upon seeing the ship's approach, his horse got spooked, and horse and rider plunged into the sea. Through miraculous intervention, the horse and rider emerged from the water alive, covered in seashells.

From its connection to the Camino, the scallop shell came to represent pilgrimage, both to a specific shrine as well as to heaven, recalling Hebrews 11:13, identifying that Christians "are pilgrims and strangers on the earth". The scallop shell symbol is used as a waymarker on the Camino, and is commonly seen on pilgrims themselves, who are thereby identified as pilgrims. During the medieval period, the shell was more a proof of completion than a symbol worn during the pilgrimage. The pilgrim's staff is a walking stick used by some pilgrims on the way to the shrine of Santiago de Compostela in Spain. Generally, the stick has a hook so that something may be hung from it; it may have a crosspiece. The usual form of representation is with a hook, but in some the hook is absent. The pilgrim's staff is represented under different forms and is referred to using different names, e.g. a pilgrim's crutch, a crutch-staff. The crutch, perhaps, should be represented with the transverse piece on the top of the staff (like the letter "T") instead of across it.

=== Medieval route history ===
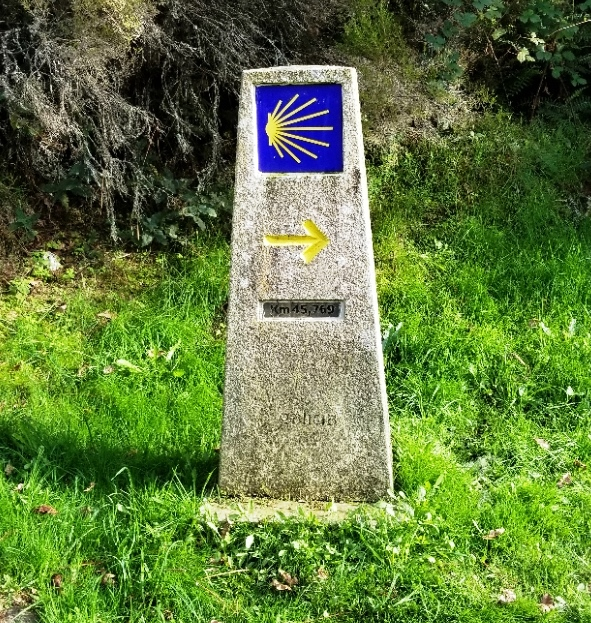
Marker of the Camino near the entrance to the Taboada Bridge, a 10th century bridge located in the Silleda Council of Pontevedra Province in Spain. The bridge is still used today by the pilgrims on their way to Santiago using the Silver Way (Vía de la Plata).

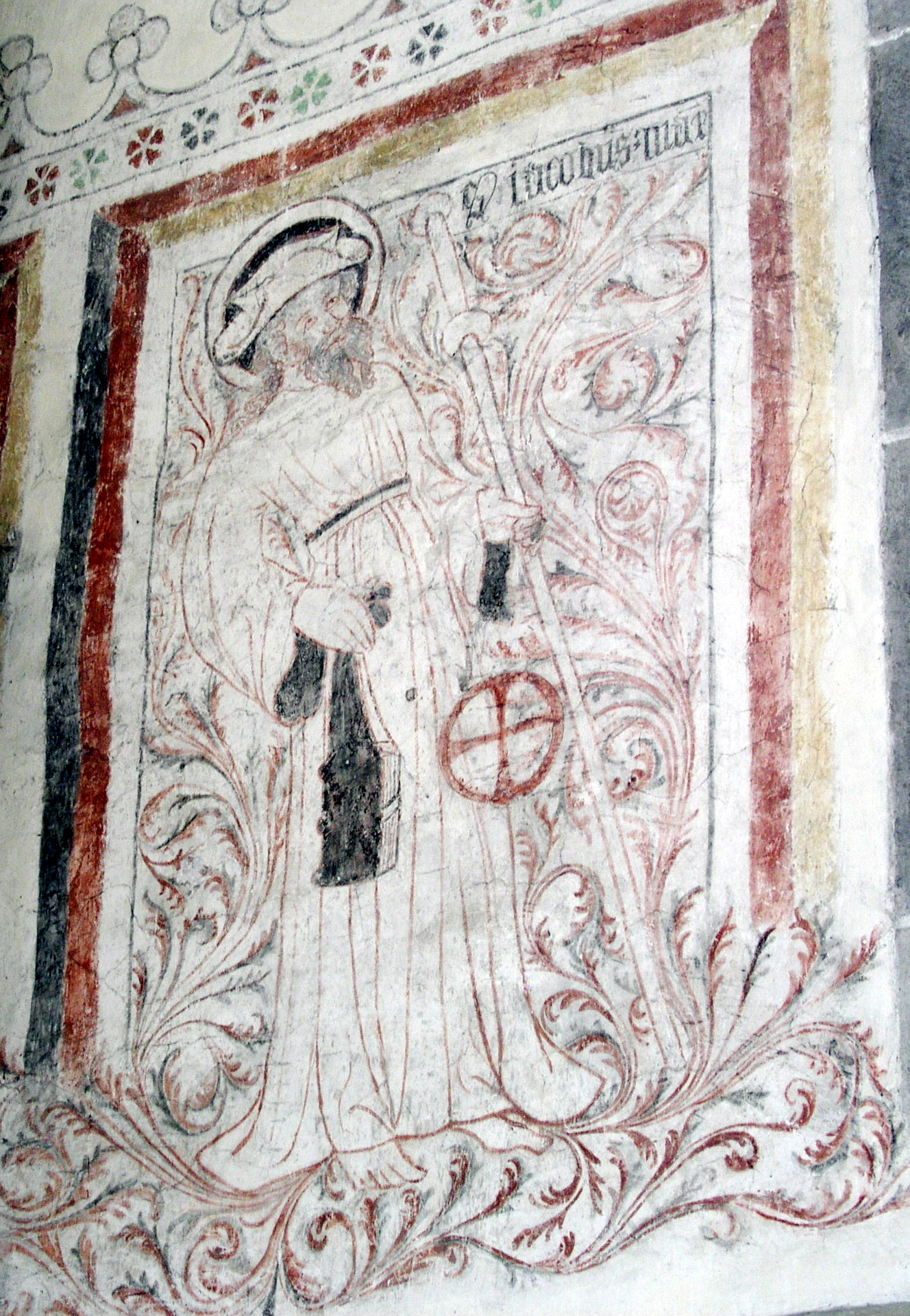
Saint James with his pilgrim's staff. The hat is typical, but he often wears his emblem, the scallop shell, on the front brim of the hat or elsewhere on his clothes

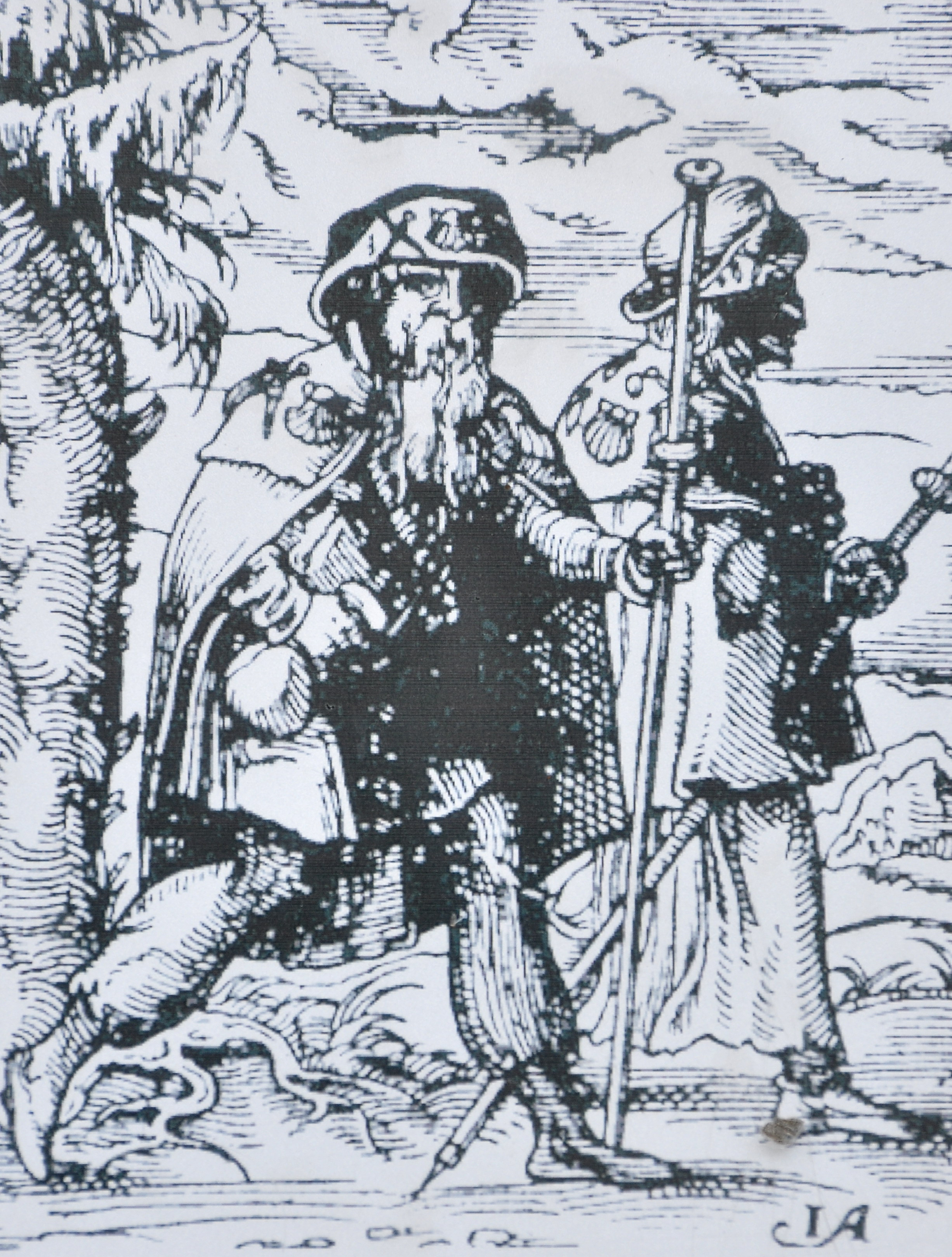
Way of St. James pilgrims (1568)

The earliest records of visits paid to the shrine at Santiago de Compostela date from the 9th century, in the time of the Kingdom of Asturias and Galicia. The pilgrimage to the shrine became the most renowned medieval pilgrimage, and it became customary for those who returned from Compostela to carry back with them a Galician scallop shell as proof of their completion of the journey. This practice gradually led to the scallop shell becoming the badge of a pilgrim.

The earliest recorded pilgrims from beyond the Pyrenees visited the shrine in the middle of the 11th century, but it seems that it was not until a century later that large numbers of pilgrims from abroad were regularly journeying there. The earliest records of pilgrims that arrived from England belong to the period between 1092 and 1105. However, by the early 12th century the pilgrimage had become a highly organized affair.

One of the great proponents of the pilgrimage in the 12th century was Pope Callixtus II, who started the Compostelan Holy Years.

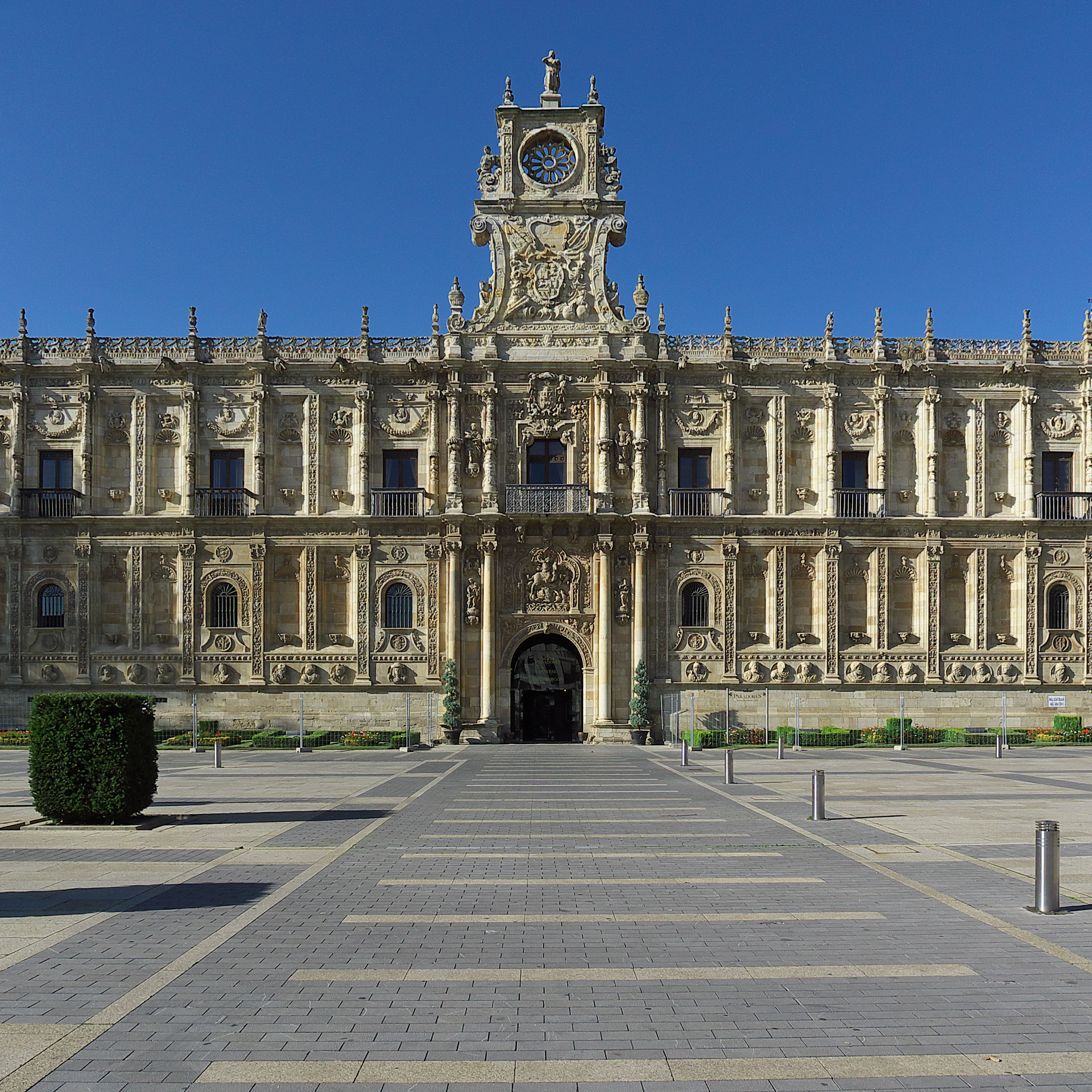
Early 18th century facade of the San Marcos Monastery in Leon, which provided care for pilgrims over many centuries

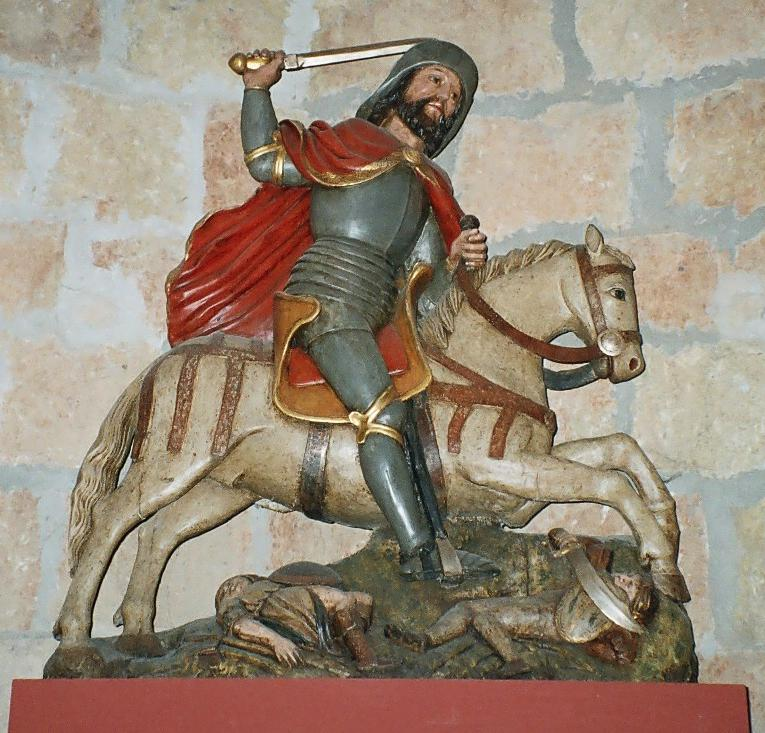
St James the Moor Slayer (Carrión de los Condes)

The daily needs of pilgrims on their way to and from Compostela were met by a series of hospitals. Indeed, these institutions contributed to the development of the modern concept of 'hospital'. Some Spanish towns still bear the name, such as Hospital de Órbigo. The hospitals were often staffed by Catholic orders and under royal protection. Donations were encouraged but many poorer pilgrims had few clothes and poor health often barely getting to the next hospital. Due to this, María Ramírez de Medrano founded one of the earliest hospitals of San Juan de Acre in Navarrete and a commandery for the protection of pilgrims on the Compostela route.

Romanesque architecture, a new genre of ecclesiastical architecture, was designed with massive archways to cope with huge crowds of the devout.

There was also the sale of the now-familiar paraphernalia of tourism, such as badges and souvenirs. Pilgrims often prayed to Saint Roch whose numerous depictions with the Cross of St James can still be seen along the Way. On the Camino, the cross is often seen with a Pilgrim's scallop to mark the way of the pilgrimage.

The pilgrimage route to Santiago de Compostela was made possible by the protection and freedom provided by the Kingdom of France, from which the majority of pilgrims originated. Enterprising French (including Gascons and other peoples not under the French crown) settled in towns along the pilgrimage routes, where their names appear in the archives. The pilgrims were tended by people like Domingo de la Calzada, who was later recognized as a saint.

Pilgrims walked the Way of St. James, often for months and occasionally years at a time, to arrive at the great church in the main square of Compostela and pay homage to St James. Many arrived with very little due to illness or robbery or both. Traditionally pilgrims lay their hands on the pillar just inside the doorway of the cathedral, and so many now have done this it has visibly worn away the stone.

The popular Spanish name for the astronomical Milky Way is El Camino de Santiago. According to a common medieval legend, the Milky Way was formed from the dust raised by travelling pilgrims.

==== First official guide book ====
The official guide in those times was the Codex Calixtinus. Published around 1140, the 5th book of the codex is still considered the definitive source for many modern guidebooks. Four pilgrimage routes listed in the codex originate in France and converge at Puente la Reina. From there, a well-defined route crosses northern Spain, linking Burgos, Carrión de los Condes, Sahagún, León, Astorga, and Compostela.

==== Legends of the discovery of the Tomb of St. James ====
Another legend states that when a hermit saw a bright star shining over a hillside near San Fiz de Solovio, he informed the bishop of Iria Flavia, who found a grave at the site with three bodies inside, one of which, he asserted, was that of St James. Subsequently, the location was called "the field of the star" (Campus Stellae, corrupted to "Compostela").

Another origin myth mentioned in Book IV of the Book of Saint James relates how the saint appeared in a dream to Charlemagne, urging him to liberate his tomb from the Moors and showing him the direction to follow by the route of the Milky Way.

=== Pilgrimage as penance ===
The Church employed (and employs) rituals (the sacrament of confession) that can lead to the imposition by a priest of penance, through which the sinner atones for his or her sins. Pilgrimages were deemed to be a suitable form of expiation for sin and long pilgrimages would be imposed as penance for very serious sins. As noted in the Catholic Encyclopedia:

In the registers of the Inquisition at Carcassone ... we find the four following places noted as being the centres of the greater pilgrimages to be imposed as penances for the graver crimes: the tombs of the Apostles at Rome, the shrine of St. James at Compostella [sic], St. Thomas' body at Canterbury, and the relics of the Three Kings at Cologne.

Pilgrimages could also be imposed as judicial punishment for crime, a practice that is still occasionally used today. For example, a tradition in Flanders persists of pardoning and releasing one prisoner every year under the condition that, accompanied by a guard, the prisoner walks to Santiago wearing a heavy backpack.

=== Enlightenment era ===
During the American Revolution, John Adams (who would become the second President of the United States) was ordered by Congress to go to Paris to obtain funds for the cause. His ship started leaking and he disembarked with his two sons at Finisterre in 1779. From there, he proceeded to follow the Way of St. James in the reverse direction of the pilgrims' route, in order to get to Paris overland. He did not stop to visit Santiago, which he later regretted. In his autobiography, Adams described the customs and lodgings afforded to St James's pilgrims in the 18th century and he recounted the legend as it was told to him:

I have always regretted that We could not find time to make a Pilgrimage to Saintiago de Compostella. We were informed ... that the Original of this Shrine and Temple of St. Iago was this. A certain Shepherd saw a bright Light there in the night. Afterwards it was revealed to an Archbishop that St. James was buried there. This laid the Foundation of a Church, and they have built an Altar on the Spot where the Shepherd saw the Light. In the time of the Moors, the People made a Vow, that if the Moors should be driven from this Country, they would give a certain portion of the Income of their Lands to Saint James. The Moors were defeated and expelled and it was reported and believed, that Saint James was in the Battle and fought with a drawn Sword at the head of the Spanish Troops, on Horseback. The People, believing that they owed the Victory to the Saint, very cheerfully fulfilled their Vows by paying the Tribute. ... Upon the Supposition that this is the place of the Sepulchre of Saint James, there are great numbers of Pilgrims, who visit it, every Year, from France, Spain, Italy and other parts of Europe, many of them on foot.

== Modern-day pilgrimage ==
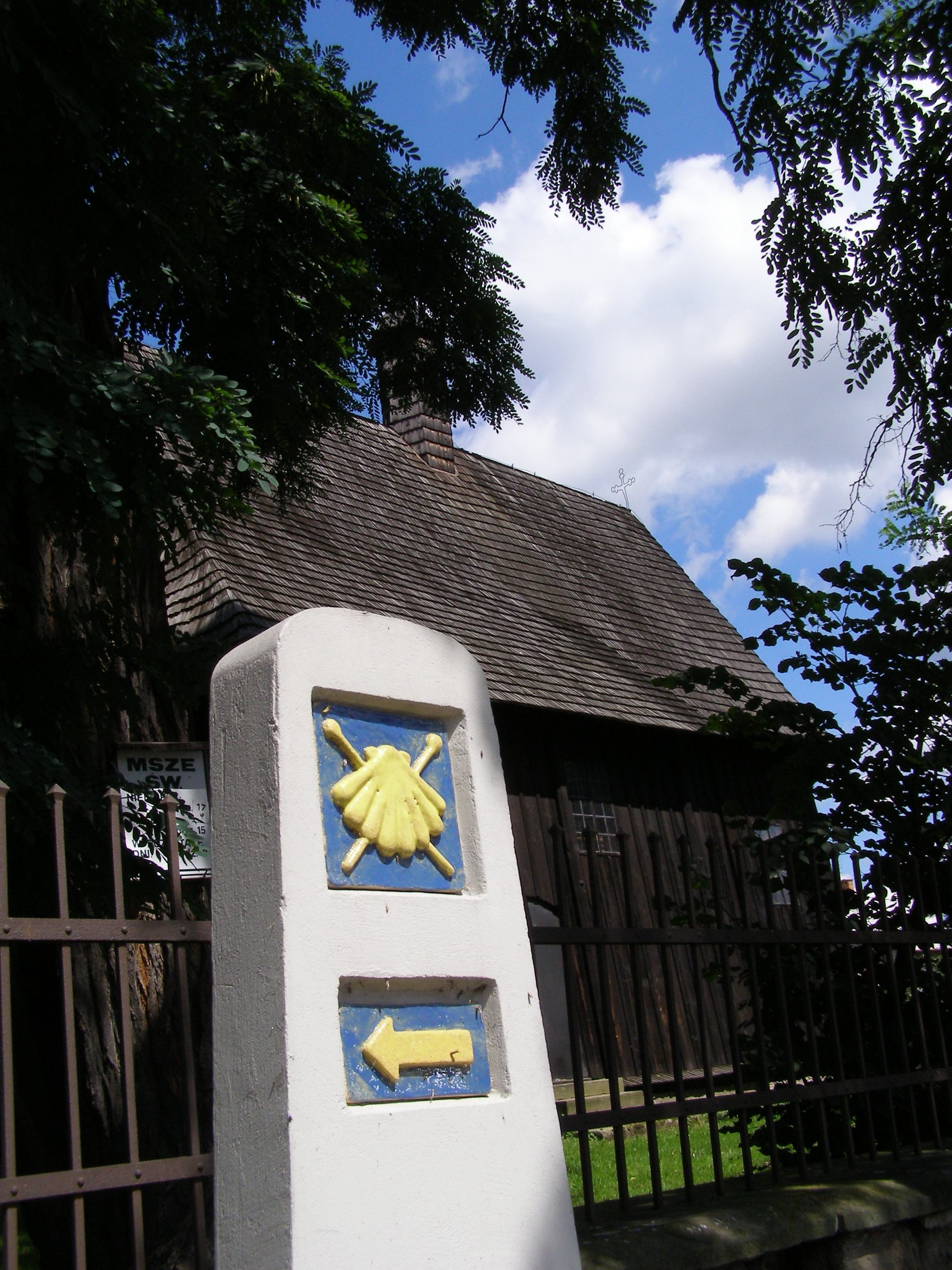
A Camino milestone by St Leonard's church, Wojnicz, Poland

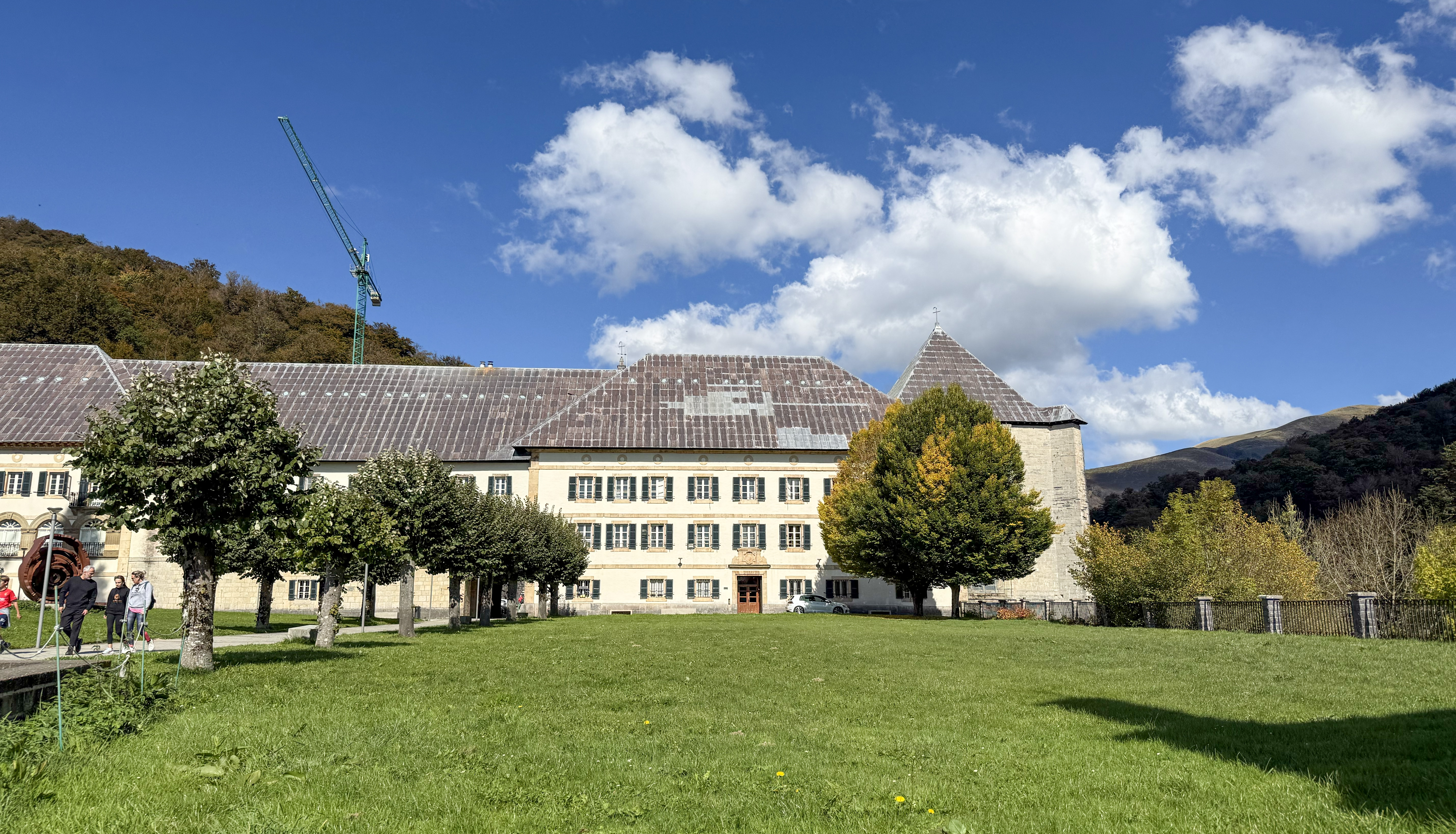
Roncesvalles

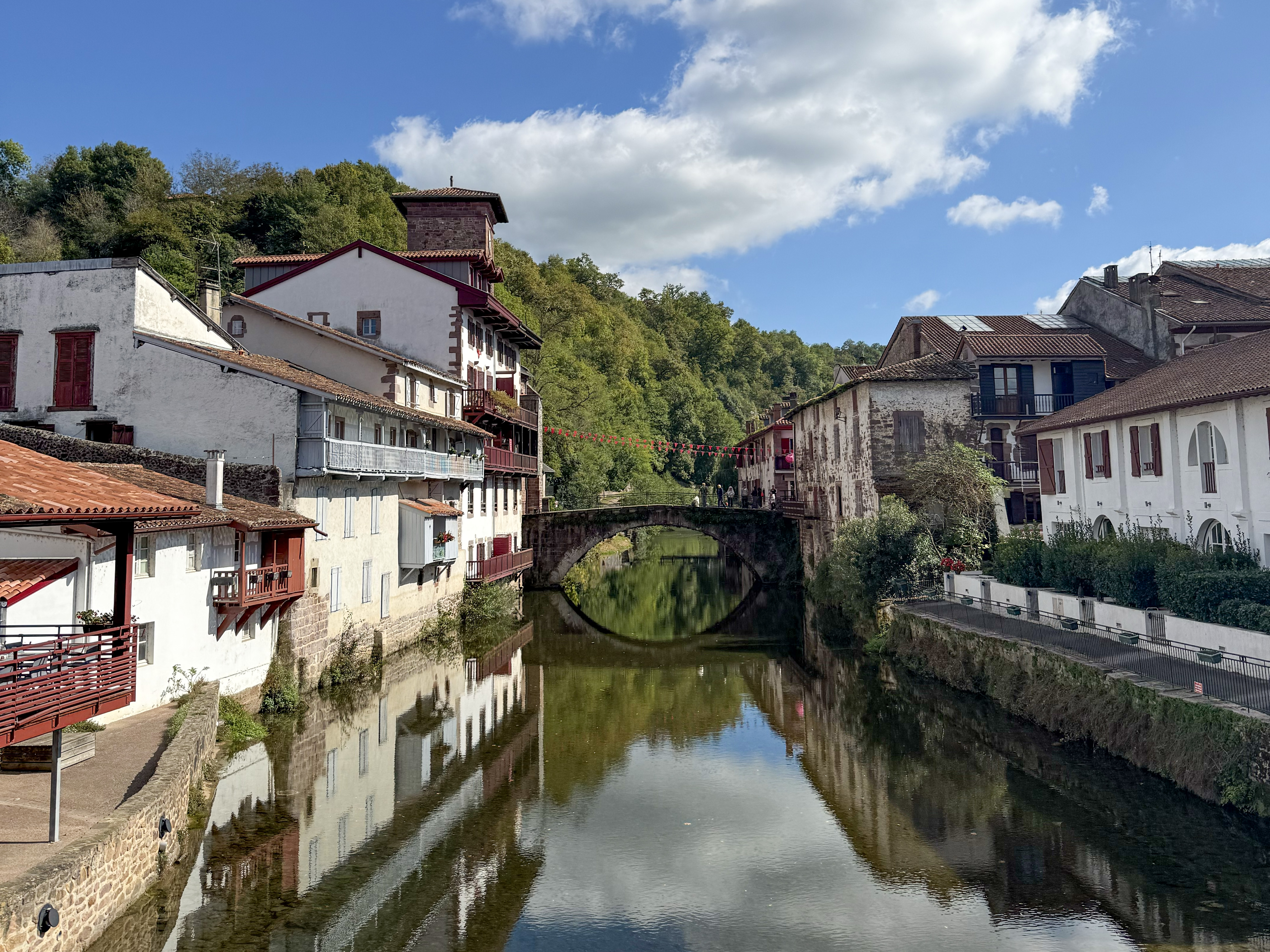
Saint-Jean-Pied-de-Port

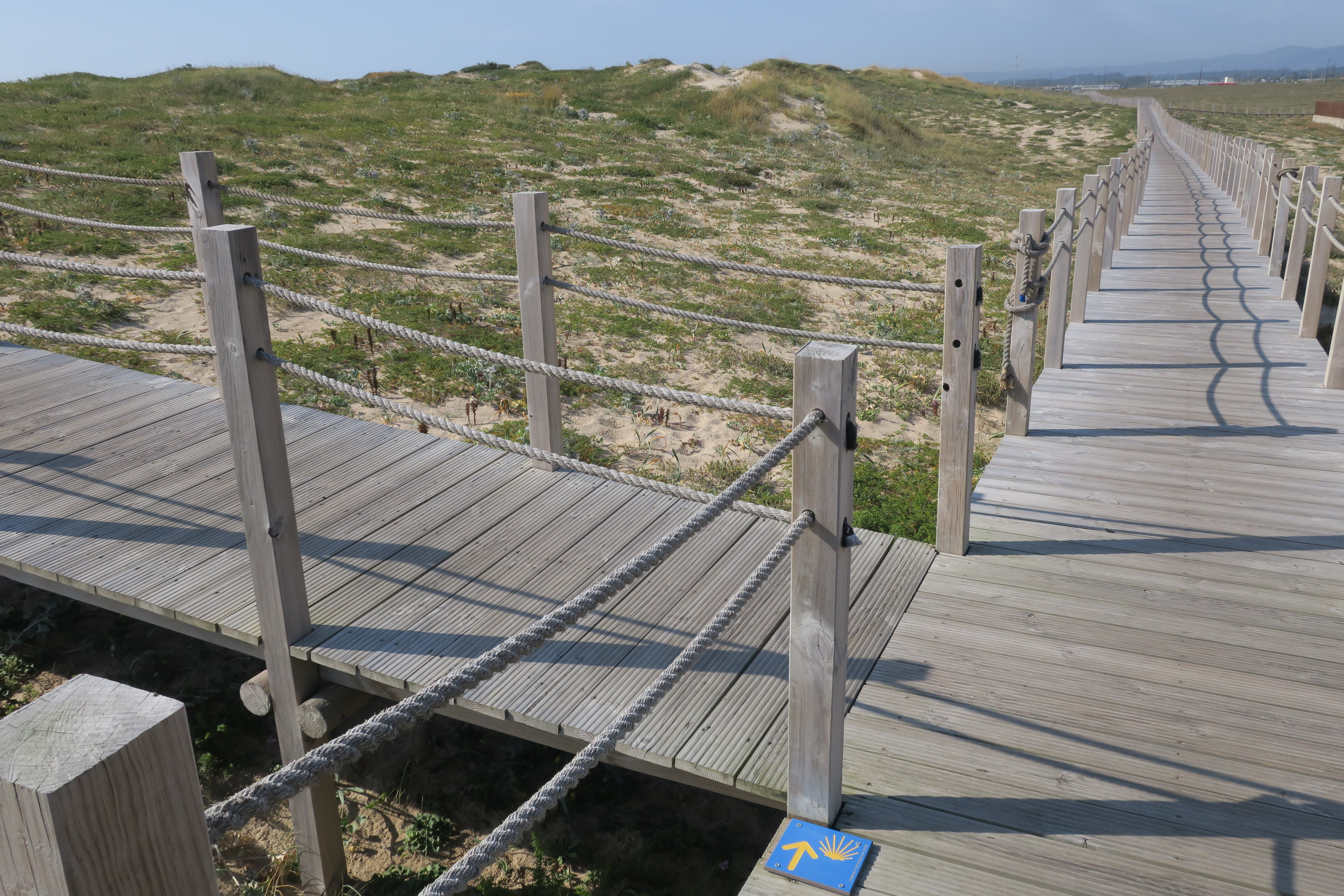
A boardwalk on the Portuguese coastal Way: Coastal sand dunes of Póvoa de Varzim

Although it is commonly believed that the pilgrimage to Santiago has continued without interruption since the Middle Ages, few modern pilgrimages antedate the 1957 publication of Irish Hispanist and traveller Walter Starkie's The Road to Santiago. The revival of the pilgrimage was supported by the Spanish government of Francisco Franco, much inclined to promote Spain's Catholic history. "It has been only recently (1990s) that the pilgrimage to Santiago regained the popularity it had in the Middle Ages."

Since then, hundreds of thousands (over 300,000 in 2017) of Christian pilgrims and many others set out each year from their homes, or from popular starting points across Europe, to make their way to Santiago de Compostela. Most travel by foot, some by bicycle, and some even travel as their medieval counterparts did, on horseback or by donkey. Many pilgrims choose to walk the final 100km, and most often achieve their Compostela certificate in 5–7 days. In addition to those undertaking a religious pilgrimage, many are hikers who walk the route for travel or sport, along with an interest in exploring their own relationship with themselves, other people, nature, and what they perceive as being sacred. Also, many consider the experience a spiritual retreat from modern life.

=== Routes ===
Main Spanish routes and the route in France with the highest number of pilgrims nowadays

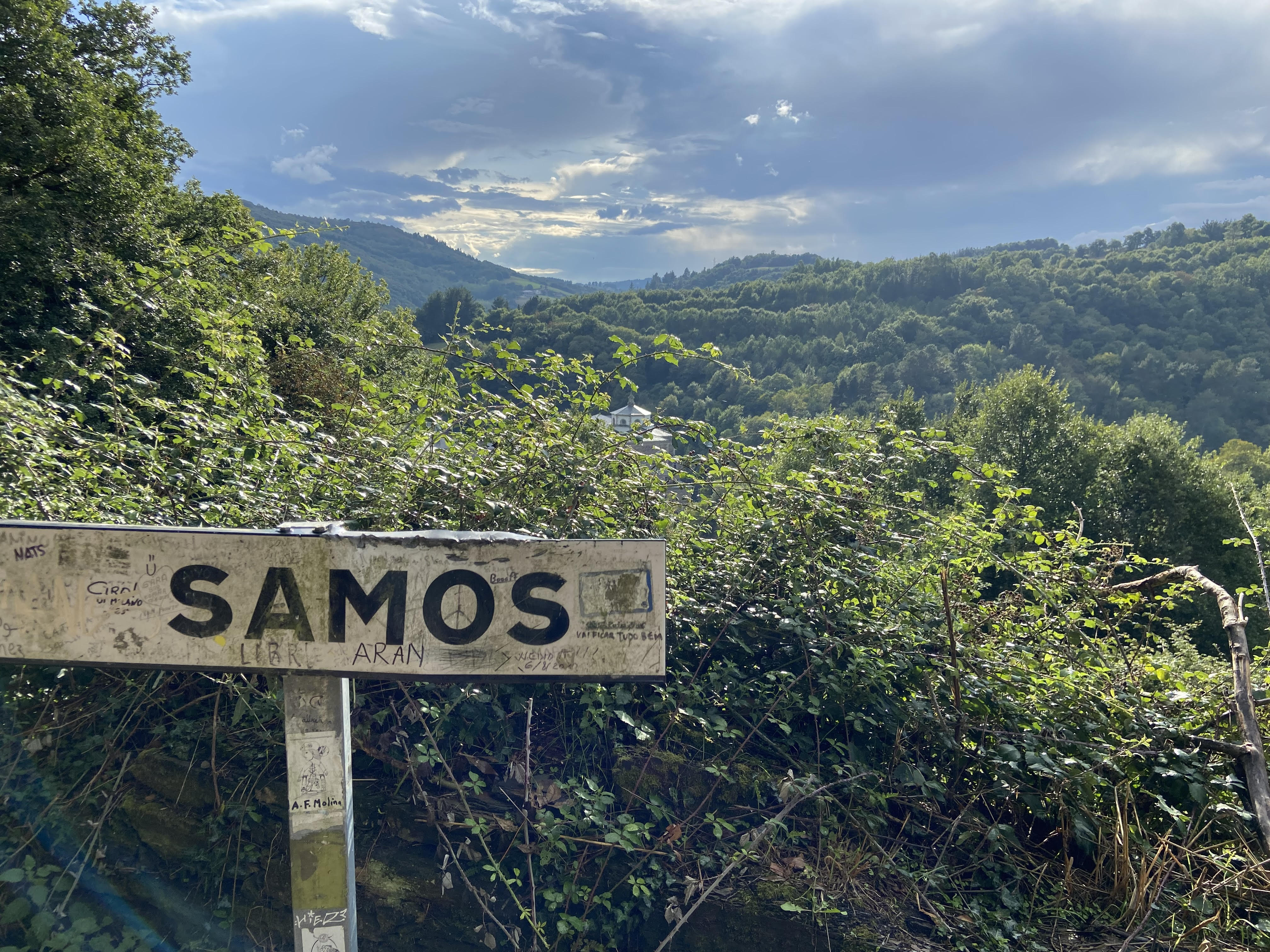
Samos, in Galicia, on the French Way

The Camino Francés, or French Way, is the most popular. The Via Regia is the last portion of the Camino Francés. Historically, because of the Codex Calixtinus, most pilgrims came from France: typically from Arles, Le Puy, Paris, and Vézelay; some from Saint Gilles. Cluny, site of the celebrated medieval abbey, was another important rallying point for pilgrims and, in 2002, it was integrated into the official European pilgrimage route linking Vézelay and Le Puy.

Most Spanish consider the French border in the Pyrenees the natural starting point. By far the most common, modern starting point on the Camino Francés is Saint-Jean-Pied-de-Port, on the French side of the Pyrenees, with Roncesvalles on the Spanish side also being popular. The distance from Roncesvalles to Santiago de Compostela through León is about 800 km (500 mi).

The Camino Primitivo, or Original Way, is the oldest route to Santiago de Compostela, first taken in the 9th century, which begins in Oviedo. It is 320 km (199 miles) long.

Camino Portugués, or Portuguese Way, is the second-most-popular route, starting at the cathedral in Lisbon (for a total of about 610 km) or at the cathedral in Porto in the north of Portugal (for a total of about 227 km), and crossing into Galicia at Valença.

The Camino del Norte, or Northern Way, is also less travelled and starts in the Basque city of Irun on the border with France, or sometimes in San Sebastián. It is a less popular route because of its changes in elevation, whereas the Camino Frances is mostly flat. The route follows the coast along the Bay of Biscay until it nears Santiago. Though it does not pass through as many historic points of interest as the Camino Frances, it has cooler summer weather. The route is believed to have been first used by pilgrims to avoid traveling through the territories occupied by the Muslims in the Middle Ages. From Irun the path is 817 km (508 miles) long.

The Central European Camino was revived after the Fall of the Berlin Wall. Medieval routes, Camino Baltico and the Via Regia in Poland, pass through present-day Poland and reach as far north as the Baltic states, taking in Vilnius, and Eastwards to present-day Ukraine and take in Lviv, Sandomierz and Kraków.

=== Accommodation ===
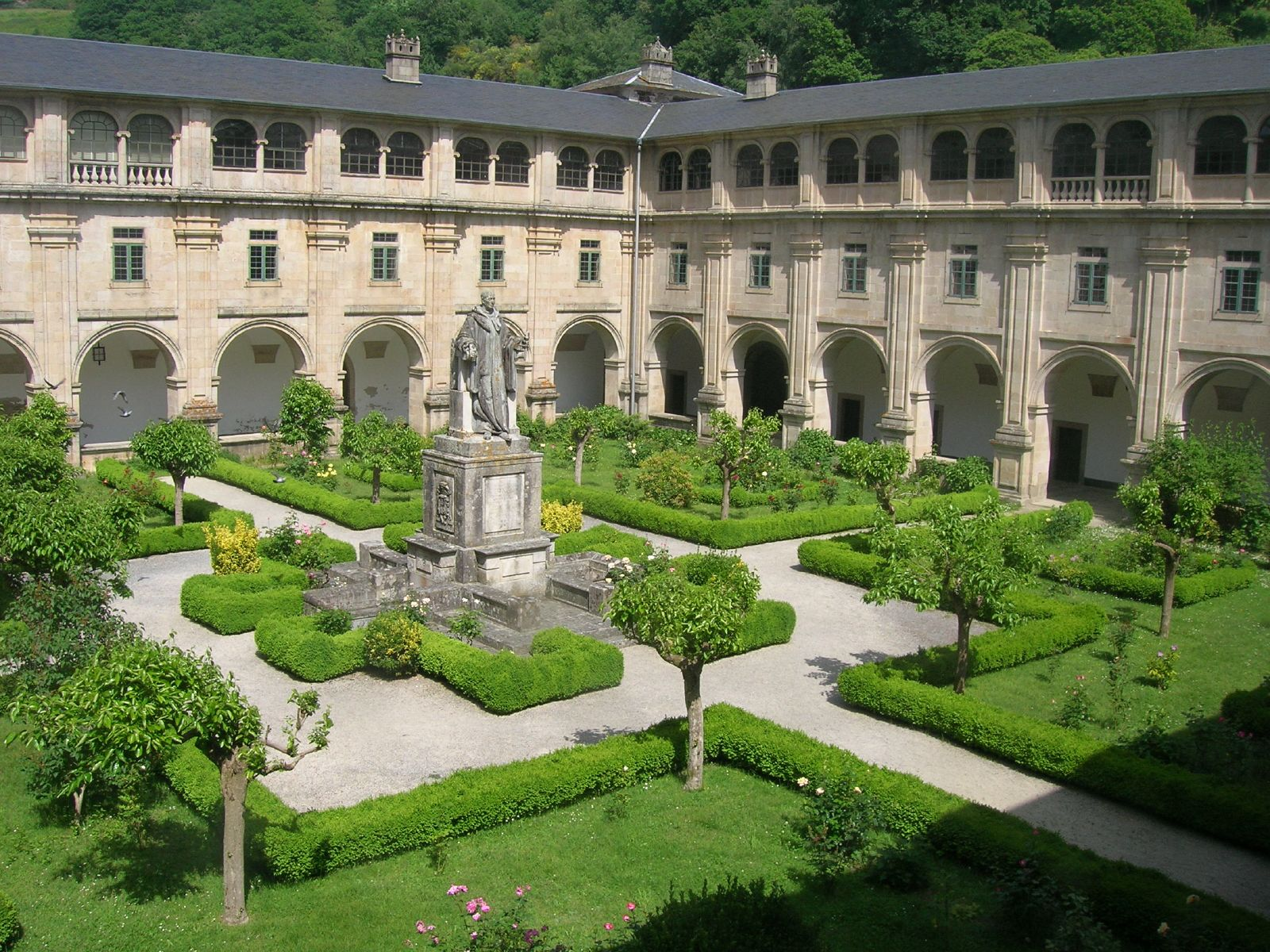
Monastery of San Xuliàn de Samos, which provides shelter for pilgrims

In Spain, France, and Portugal, pilgrims' hostels with beds in dormitories provide overnight accommodation for pilgrims who hold a credencial (see below). In Spain this type of accommodation is called a refugio or albergue, both of which are similar to youth hostels or hostelries in the French system of gîtes d'étape. El Camino offers as well a variety of hotels with different price points and ammenities.

Hostels may be run by a local parish, the local council, private owners, or pilgrims' associations. Occasionally, these refugios are located in monasteries, such as the one in the Monastery of San Xulián de Samos that is run by monks, and the one in Santiago de Compostela.

The final hostel on the route is the famous Hostal de los Reyes Católicos, which lies in the Plaza del Obradoiro across the Cathedral. It was originally constructed as hospice and hospital for pilgrims by Queen Isabella I of Castile and King Ferdinand II of Aragon, the Catholic Monarchs. Today it is a luxury 5-star Parador hotel, which still provides free services to a limited number of pilgrims daily.

=== Credencial or pilgrim's passport ===
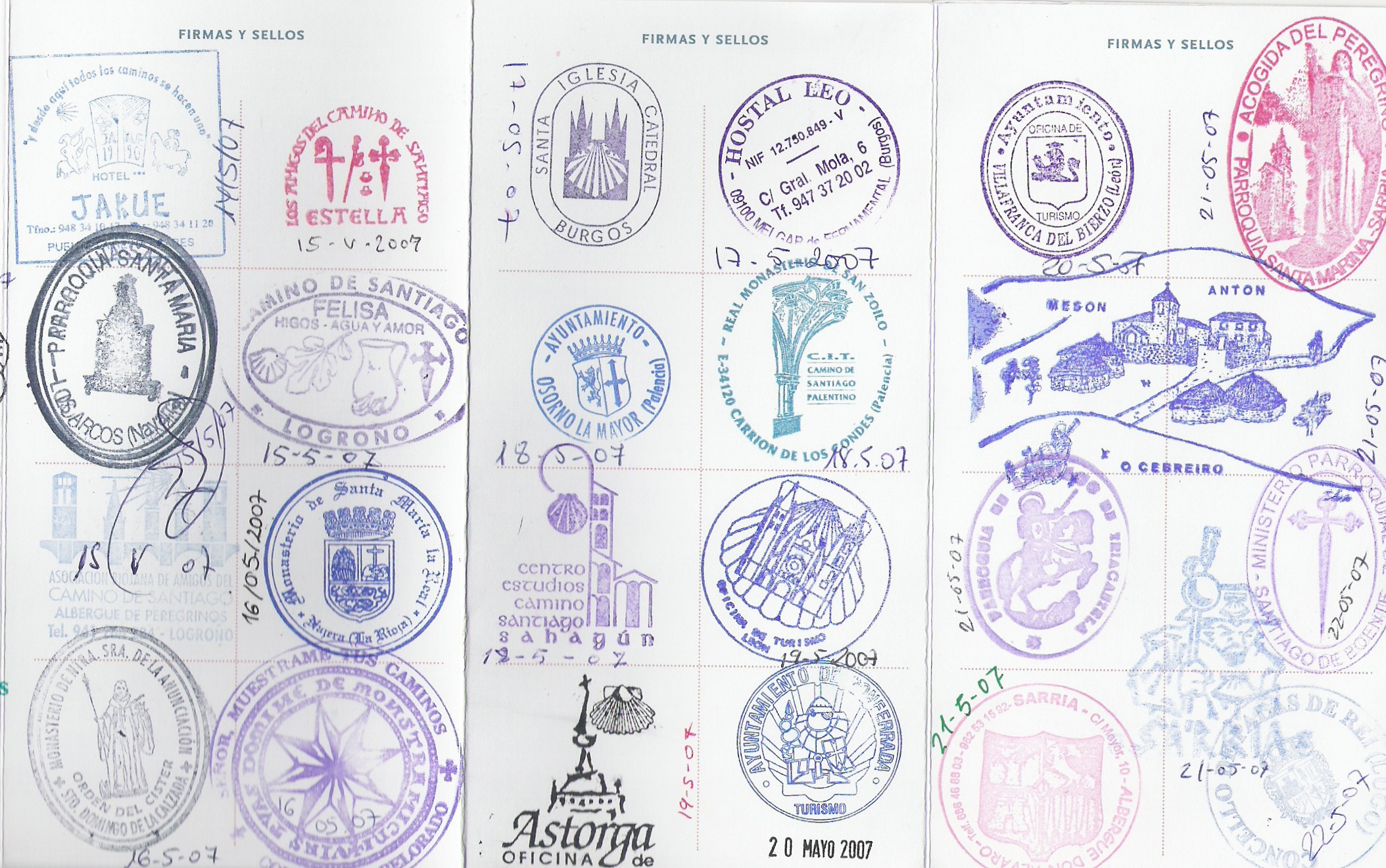
St. James pilgrim passport stamps in Spain for the Camino Frances

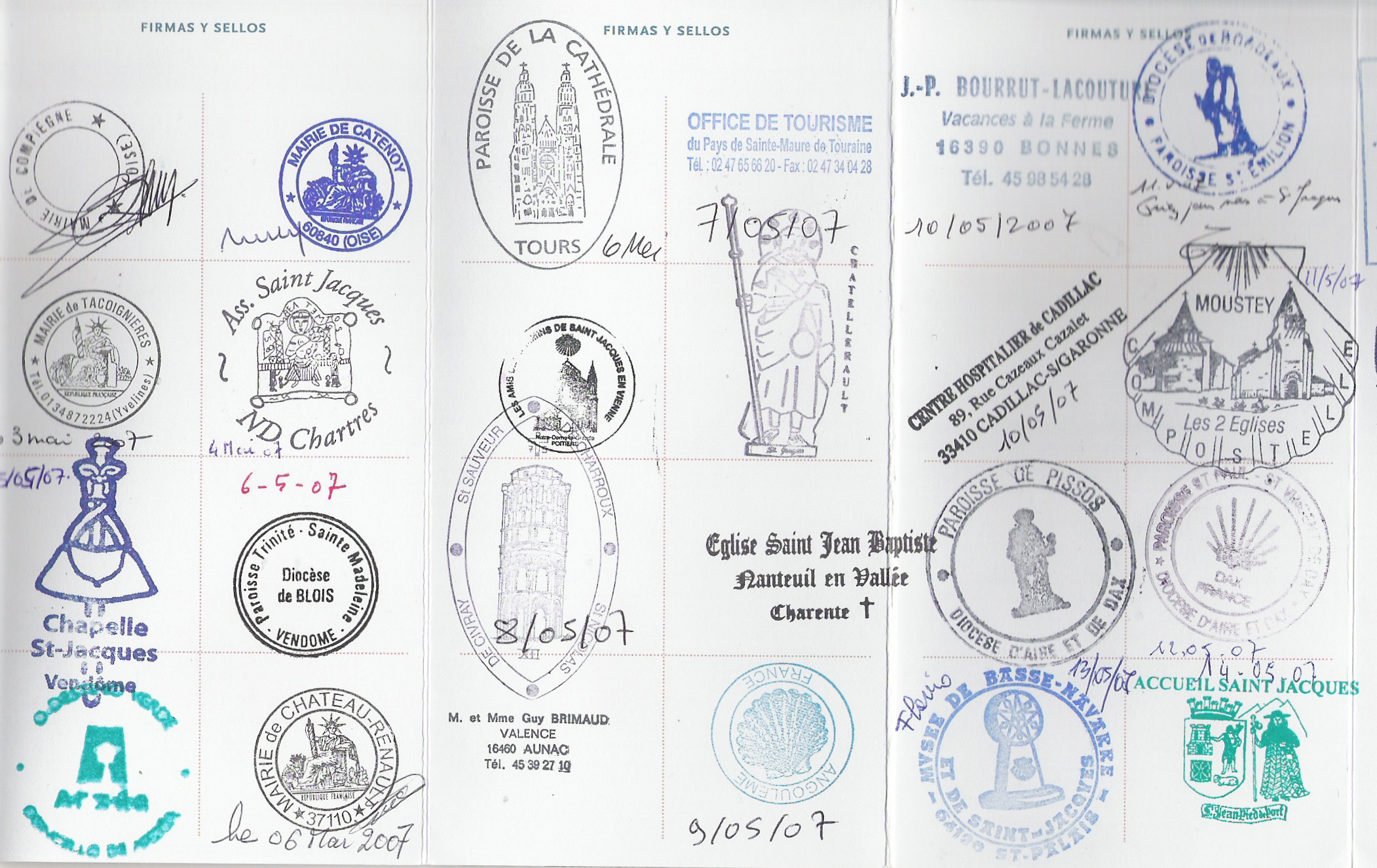
St. James pilgrim passport stamps in France on the Via Turonensis (Tours route) for the Chemin de St. Jacques de Compostelle. The World Heritage Sites of the Routes of Santiago de Compostela in France lists the major French towns with stamps

Most pilgrims purchase and carry a document called the credencial, which gives access to overnight accommodation along the route. Also known as the "pilgrim's passport", the credencial is stamped with the official St. James stamp of each town or refugio at which the pilgrim has stayed. It can also be stamped in local businesses. It provides pilgrims with a record of where they ate or slept and serves as proof to the Pilgrim's Office in Santiago that the journey was accomplished according to an official route and thus that the pilgrim qualifies to receive a compostela (certificate of completion of the pilgrimage).

=== Compostela ===
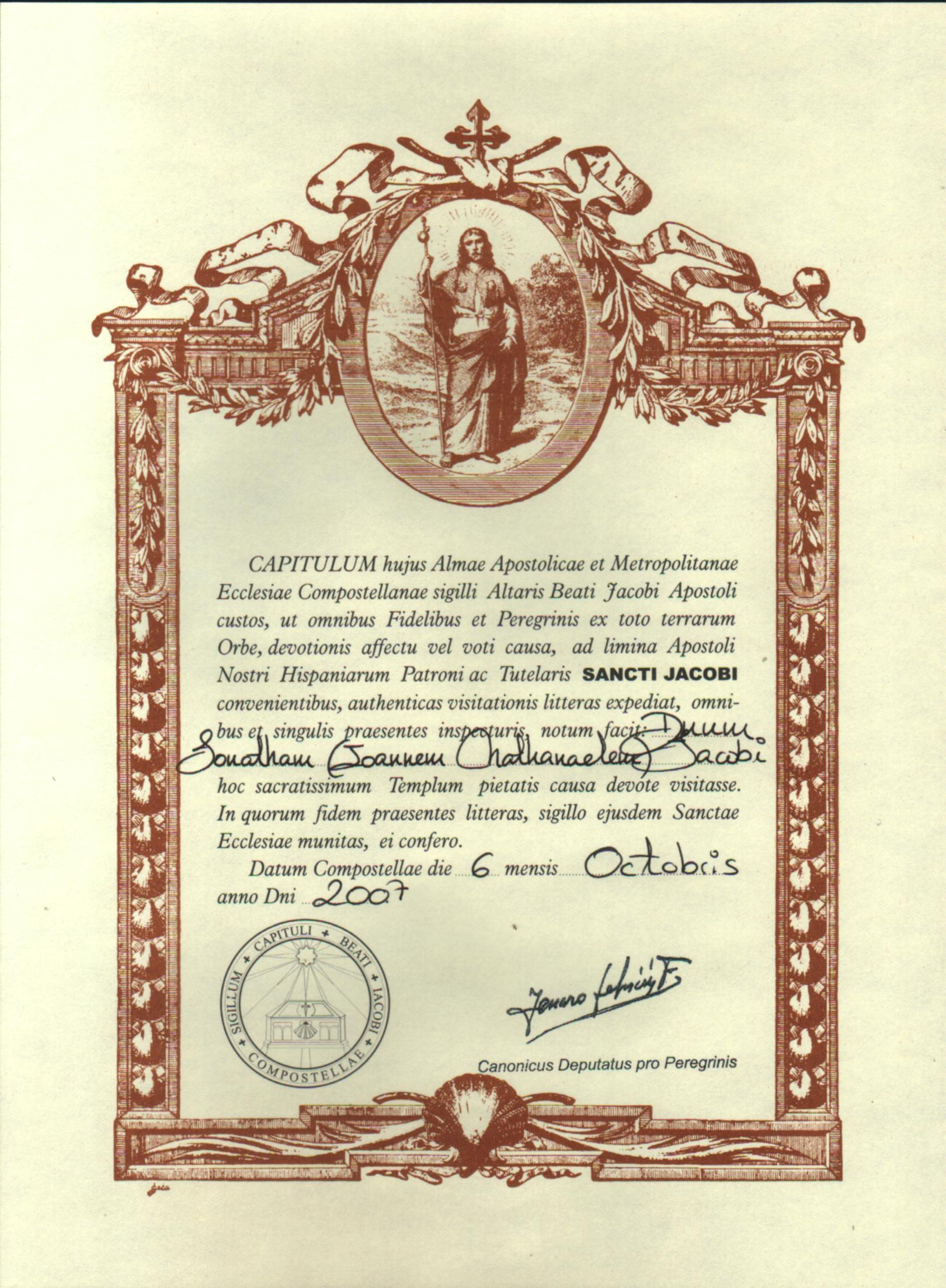
A Compostela from 2007

The compostela is a certificate of accomplishment given to pilgrims on completing the Way. To earn the compostela one needs to walk a minimum of 100 km or cycle at least 200 km. In practice, for walkers, the closest convenient point to start is Sarria, as it has good bus and rail connections to other places in Spain. Pilgrims arriving in Santiago de Compostela who have walked at least the last 100 km (62 mi), or cycled 200 km (120 mi) to get there (as indicated on their credencial), and who state that their motivation was at least partially religious, are eligible for the compostela from the Pilgrim's Office in Santiago.

The compostela has been indulgenced since the Early Middle Ages and remains so to this day, during Holy Years. The English translation reads:

The CHAPTER of this holy apostolic and metropolitan Church of Compostela, guardian of the seal of the Altar of the blessed Apostle James, in order that it may provide authentic certificates of visitation to all the faithful and to pilgrims from all over the earth who come with devout affection or for the sake of a vow to the shrine of our Apostle St. James, the patron and protector of Spain, hereby makes known to each and all who shall inspect this present document that [Name]

has visited this most sacred temple for the sake of pious devotion. As a faithful witness of these things I confer upon him [or her] the present document, authenticated by the seal of the same Holy Church.

Given at Compostela on the [day] of the month of [month] in the year of the Lord [year].

Deputy Canon for Pilgrims

The simpler certificate of completion in Spanish for those with non-religious motivation reads:

La S.A.M.I. Catedral de Santiago de Compostela le expresa su bienvenida cordial a la Tumba Apostólica de Santiago el Mayor; y desea que el Santo Apóstol le conceda, con abundancia, las gracias de la Peregrinación.

English translation:

The Holy Apostolic Metropolitan Cathedral of Santiago de Compostela expresses its warm welcome to the Tomb of the Apostle St. James the Greater; and wishes that the holy Apostle may grant you, in abundance, the graces of the Pilgrimage.

The Pilgrim's Office gives more than 100,000 compostelas each year to pilgrims from more than 100 countries. However, the requirements to earn a compostela ensure that not everyone who walks on the Camino receives one. The requirements for receiving a compostela are: 1) make the Pilgrimage for religious/spiritual reasons or at least have an attitude of search, 2) do the last 100 km on foot or horseback or the last 200 km by bicycle. 3) collect a certain number of stamps on a credencial.

=== Pilgrim's Mass ===
Pilgrims finishing the Camino, 1985–2025

Green bars are holy years

A Pilgrim's Mass is held in the Cathedral of Santiago de Compostela each day at 12:00 and 19:30. Pilgrims who received the compostela the day before have their countries of origin and the starting point of their pilgrimage announced at the Mass. The Botafumeiro, one of the largest censers in the world, is operated during certain Solemnities and on every Friday, except Good Friday, at 19:30. Priests administer the Sacrament of Penance, or confession, in many languages. In the Holy Year of 2010 the Pilgrim's Mass was exceptionally held four times a day, at 10:00, 12:00, 18:00, and 19:30, catering for the greater number of pilgrims arriving in the Holy Year.

=== Pilgrimage as tourism ===
The Xunta de Galicia (Galicia's regional government) promotes the Way as a tourist activity, particularly in Holy Compostela Years (when 25 July falls on a Sunday). Following Galicia's investment and advertising campaign for the Holy Year of 1993, the number of pilgrims completing the route has been steadily rising. The most recent Holy Year occurred in 2021, 11 years after the last Holy Year of 2010. The next Holy Year pilgrimage will occur in 2027.

=== Statistics ===
The Pilgrims Office publishes statistics regarding pilgrims who got the certificate of accomplishment. In 2024 the most popular routes were the Frances (47%), Portugues (19%), Potuguese Costa (15%), Ingles (5.6%), Primitivo (4.9%) and Norte (4.3%). Most pilgrims had a Spanish nationality (44%), followed by US-Americans (8%), Italians (6%), Germans (4.9%) and Portuguese (4.6%). Most pilgrims started in Sarria (32%), Tui/Valença (11.3%), Porto (10.5%), Saint-Jean-Pied-de-Port (6.9%) and Ferrol (5.7%). 93% do the journey on foot and 4.6% by bike. The months in which most pilgrims finish their journey in Santiago de Compostela are from May to September.

Year	Pilgrims
2025	530,772
2024	499,239
2023	446,035
2022	437,507
2021	178,912^{1, 4}
2020	54,144^{4}
2019	347,578
2018	327,378
2017	301,036
2016	277,915
2015	262,458
2014	237,886
2013	215,880
2012	192,488
2011	179,919
2010	272,703^{1}
2009	145,877
2008	125,141
2007	114,026
2006	100,377
2005	93,924
2004	179,944^{1}
2003	74,614
2002	68,952
2001	61,418
2000	55,004³
1999	154,613^{1}
1998	30,126
1997	25,179
1996	23,218
1995	19,821
1994	15,863
1993	99,436^{1}
1992	9,764
1991	7,274
1990	4,918
1989	5,760²
1988	3,501
1987	2,905
1986	1,801
1985	690
^{1} Holy Years (Xacobeo/Jacobeo)^{2} 4th World Youth Day in Santiago de Compostela^{3} Santiago named European Capital of Culture^{4} Years of COVID-19 pandemic Source: The archives of Santiago de Compostela.

=== In film, television & literature ===
==== Selected literature ====
(Alphabetical by author's surname)

- Carson, Anne (1987). Kinds of Water.
- Coelho, Paulo (1987). The Pilgrimage.
- Follett, Ken (1989). The Pillars of the Earth.
- Hemingway, Ernest (1926). The Sun Also Rises.
- Hitt, Jack (1994). Off the Road: A Modern-Day Walk Down the Pilgrim's Route into Spain.
- Kerkeling, Hape (2009). I'm Off Then: Losing and Finding Myself on the Camino de Santiago.
- Lodge, David (1995). Therapy.
- MacLaine, Shirley (2001). The Camino: A Journey of the Spirit.
- McCarthy, Andrew (2023). Walking with Sam: A father, a son and five hundred miles across Spain.
- Michener, James (1968). Iberia.
- Moore, Tim (2004). Spanish Steps: Travels With My Donkey.
- Nooteboom, Cees (1996). Roads to Santiago.
- Rudolph, Conrad (2004). Pilgrimage to the End of the World: The Road to Santiago de Compostela.
- Simsion, Graeme; Buist, Anne (2017). Two Steps Forward.
- Starkie, Walter (1957). The Road to Santiago. E. P. Dutton & Company, Inc.
- Whyte, David (1 May 2012). Santiago. Many Rivers Press. p. . ISBN 978-1932887259.

==== Other ====
(Chronological)

- In 1969, the pilgrimage is central to the plot of the French surrealist comedy-drama film The Milky Way, directed by surrealist Luis Buñuel. It is intended to critique the Catholic church, as the modern pilgrims encounter various manifestations of Catholic dogma and heresy.
- In 2003, for UK's Channel Five, The Naked Pilgrim documents the journey of art critic and journalist Brian Sewell to Santiago de Compostela. Travelling by car along the French route, he visited many towns and cities on the way including Paris, Chartres, Roncesvalles, Burgos, León and Frómista. Sewell, a lapsed Catholic, was moved by the stories of other pilgrims and by the sights he saw. The series climaxed with Sewell's emotional response to the Mass at Compostela.
- In 2005, The Way of Saint James was the central feature of the French film Saint-Jacques… La Mecque, directed by Coline Serreau.
- On his PBS travel Europe television series (1991–1998), Rick Steves covers Northern Spain and the Camino de Santiago in series 6.
- In 2010, The Way, written and directed by Emilio Estevez, Martin Sheen learns that his son (Estevez) has died early along the route and takes up the pilgrimage in order to complete it on the son's behalf. The film was presented at the Toronto International Film Festival in September 2010 and premiered in Santiago in November 2010.
- In 2013, Simon Reeve presented the "Pilgrimage" series on BBC2, in which he followed various pilgrimage routes across Europe, including the Camino de Santiago in episode 2.
- In 2014, Lydia B. Smith and Future Educational Films released Walking the Camino: Six Ways to Santiago in theatres across the U.S. and Canada. The film features the accounts and perspectives of six pilgrims as they navigate their respective journeys from France to Santiago de Compostela.
- In 2018, series one of BBC Two's Pilgrimage followed this pilgrimage.
- In 2024, the Australian drama film The Way, My Way, based on a life story.
- In 2025, in the US post-apocalyptic horror drama television series The Walking Dead: Daryl Dixon, episode "El Sacrifico," Daryl Dixon visits part of the Camino de Santiago while in Spain, leaving the Rubik's Cube of his young friend Laurent there.
- In 2025, the Italian comedy film Buen Camino by Checco Zalone.
- In 2026, the French comedy-drama film Santiago: The Camino Therapy (French: Compostelle) by Yann Samuell.

== Gallery ==
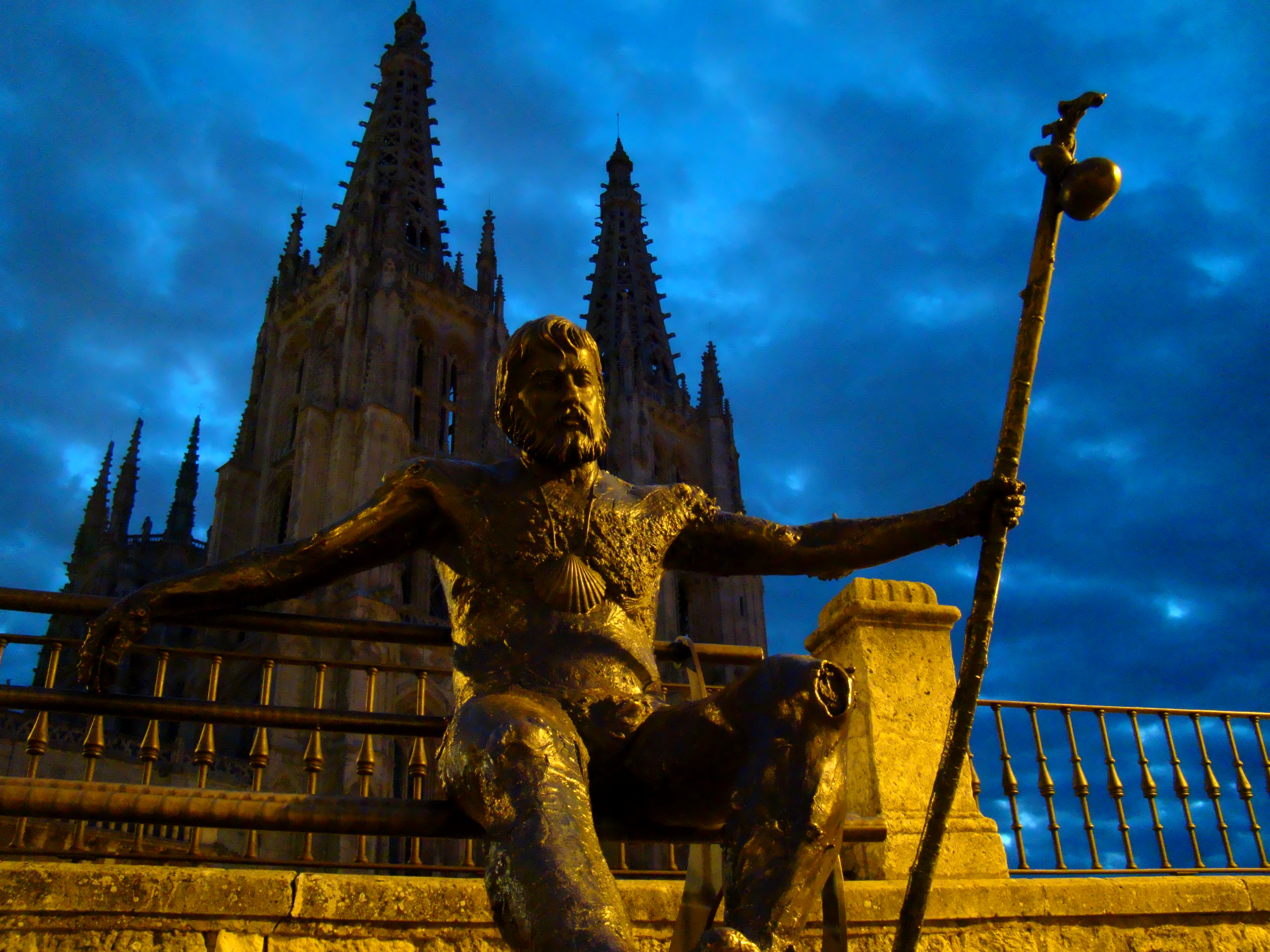
Monument to pilgrims in Burgos

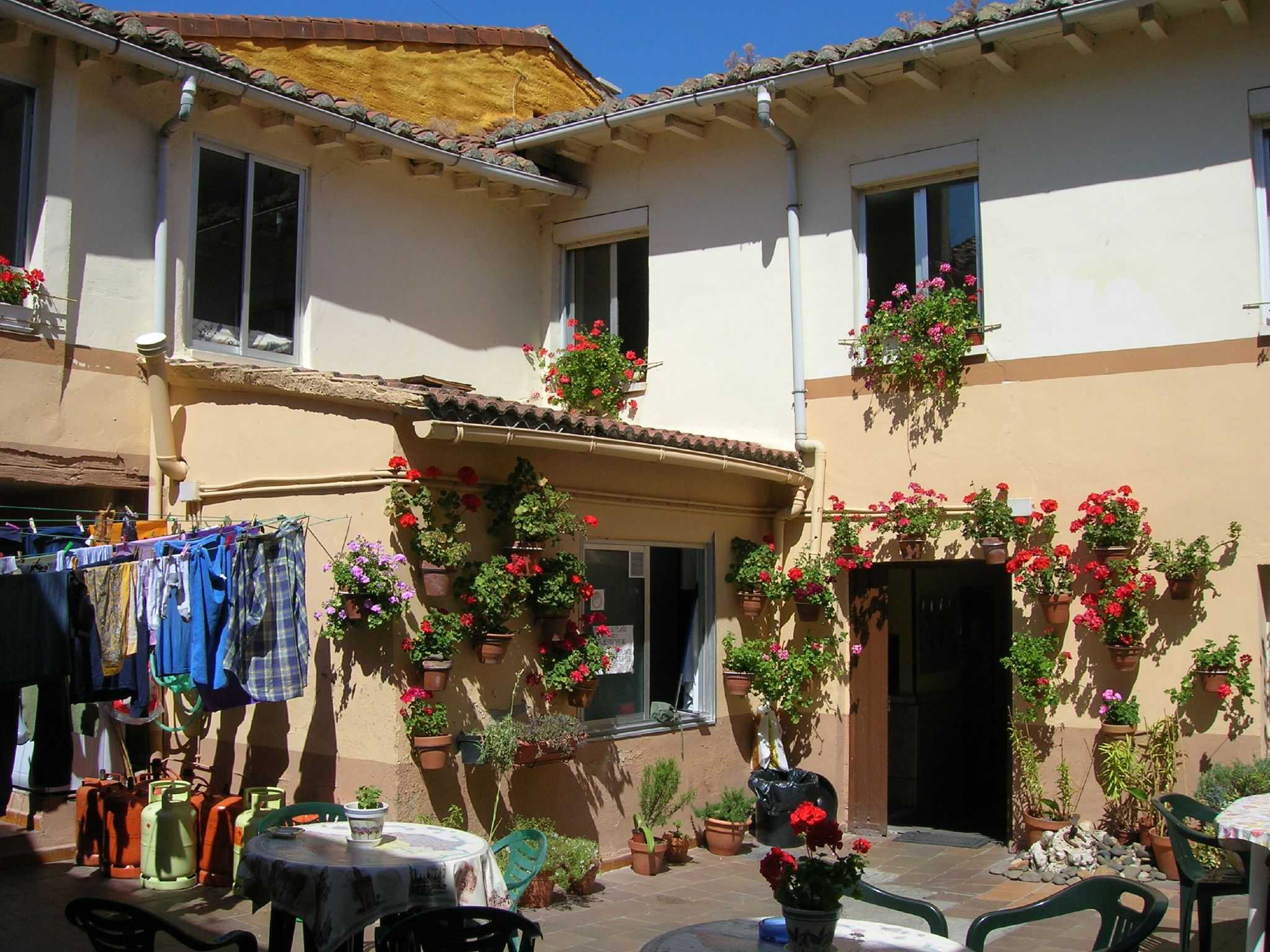
A pilgrims hostel in Mansilla de las Mulas

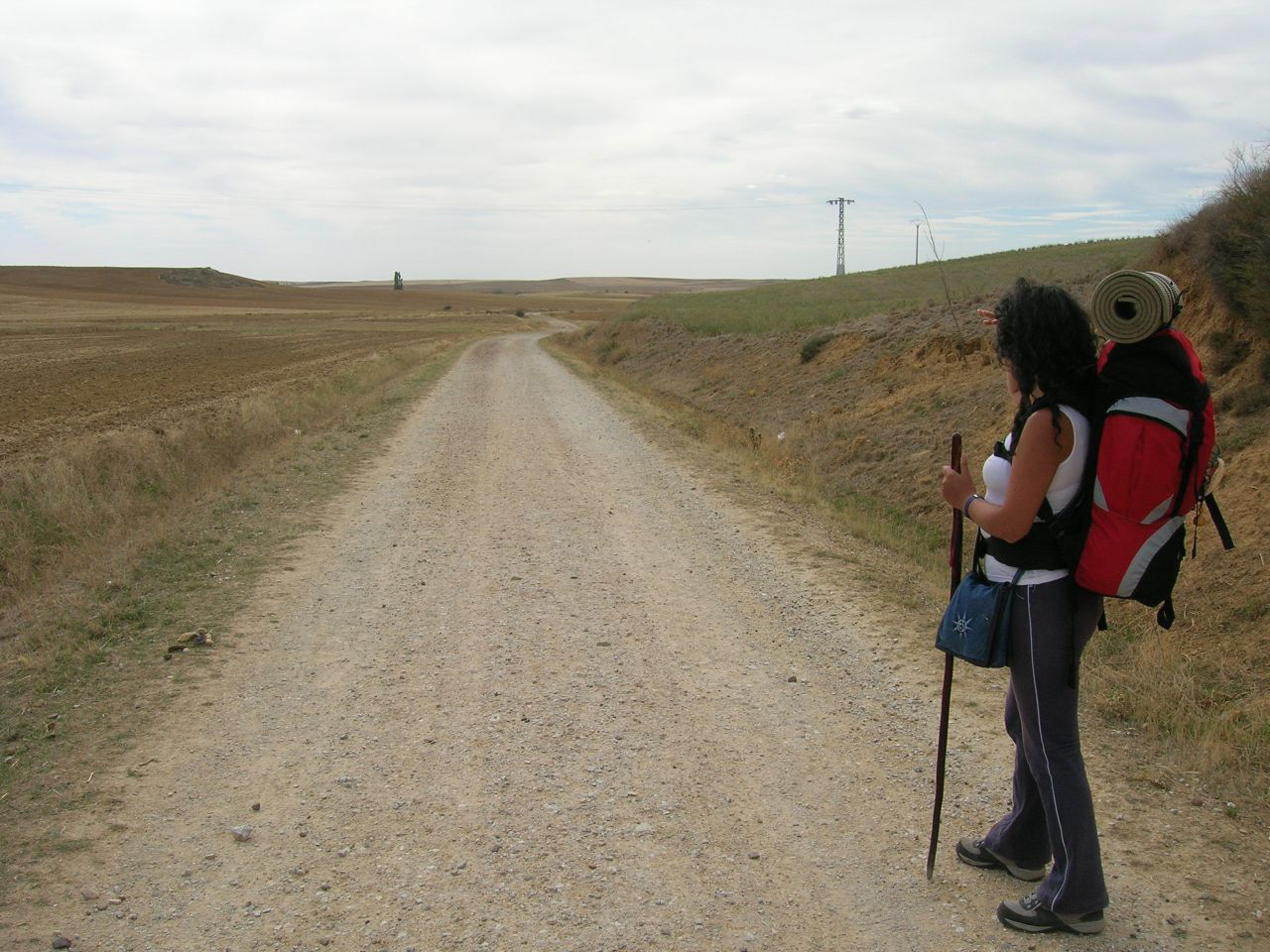
A pilgrim on the barren and impressive meseta, which offers a long and challenging walk

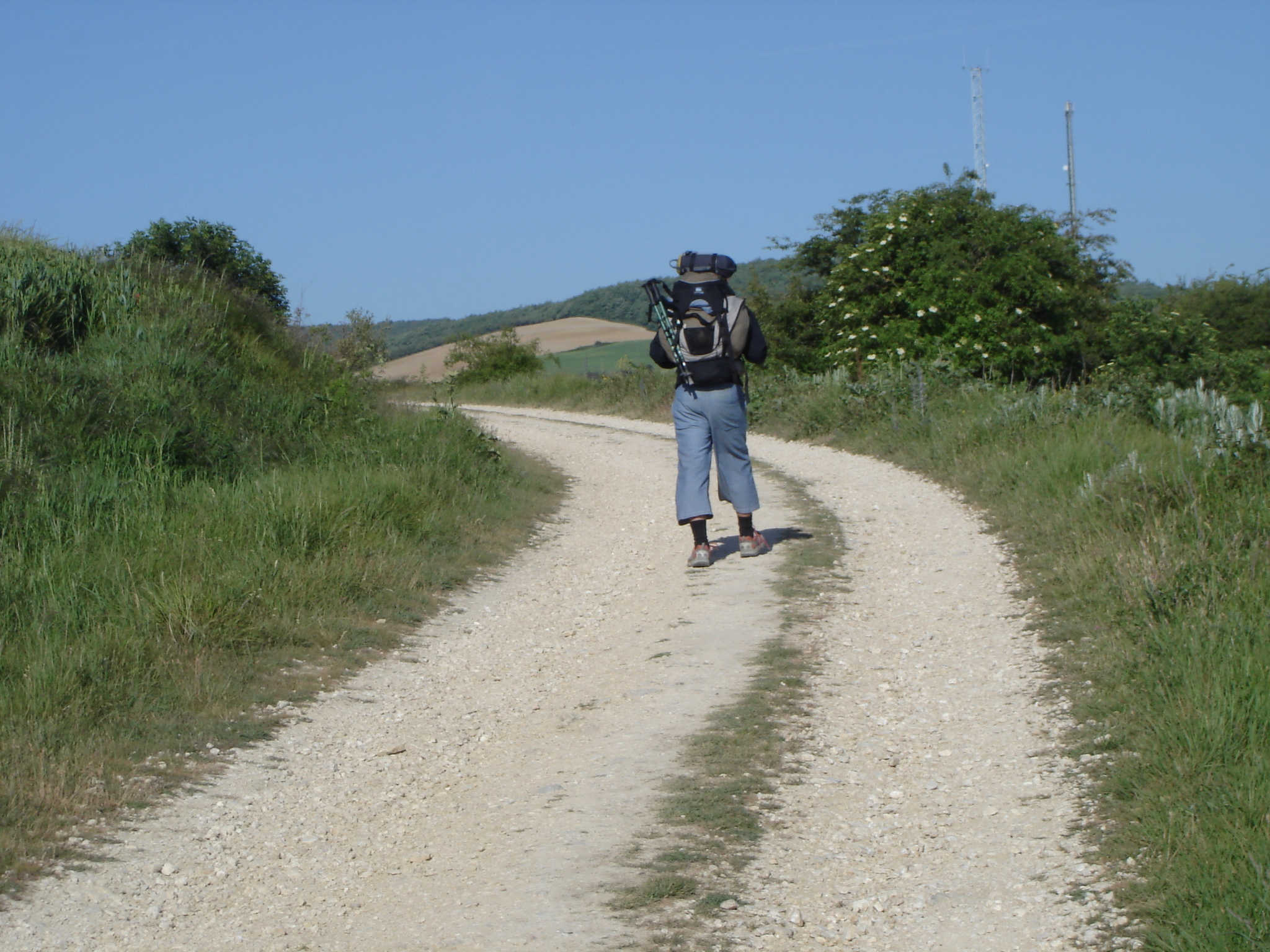
A pilgrim near San Juan de Ortega

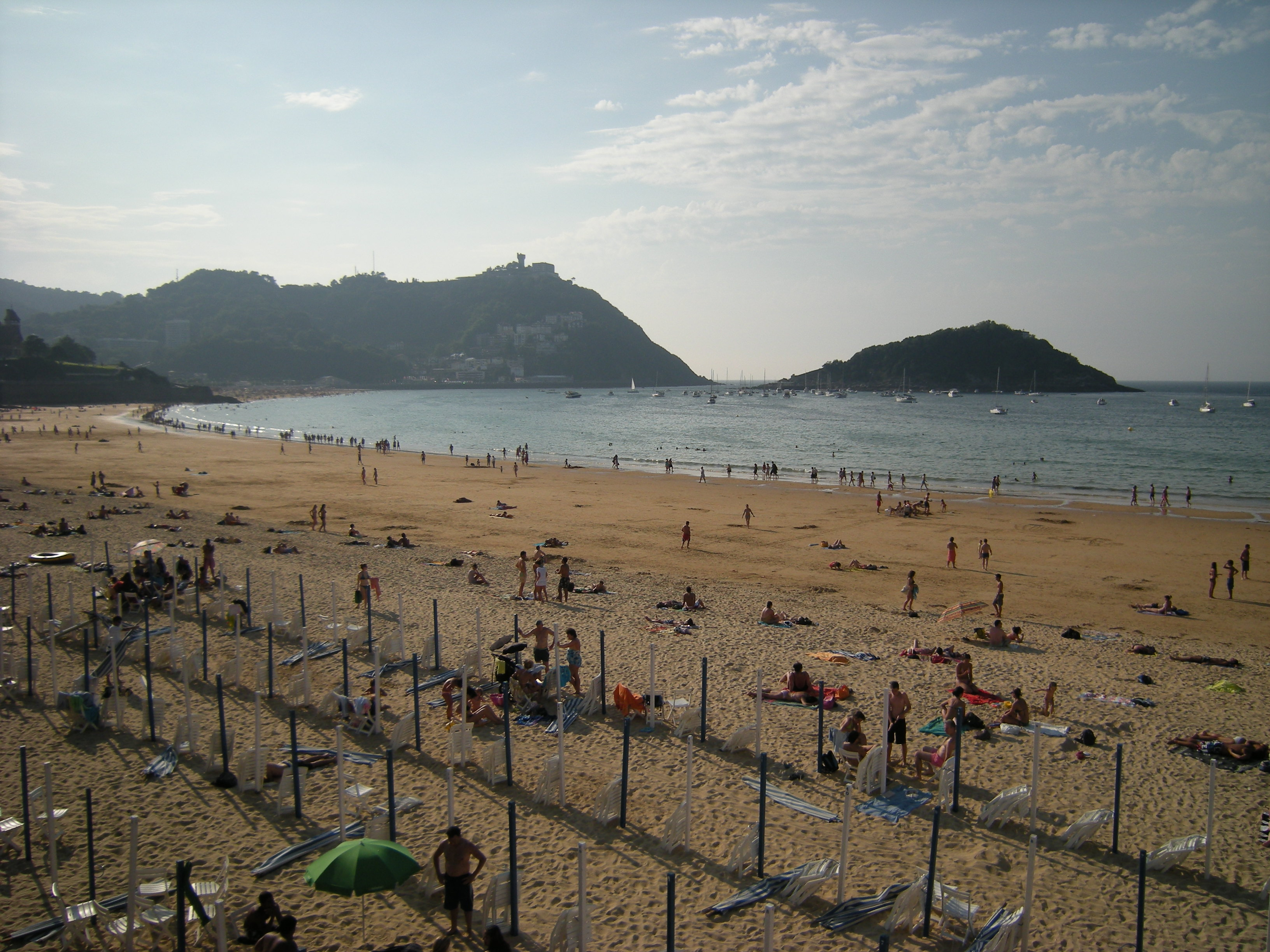
View on el Camino del Norte. San Sebastián, playa de la Concha

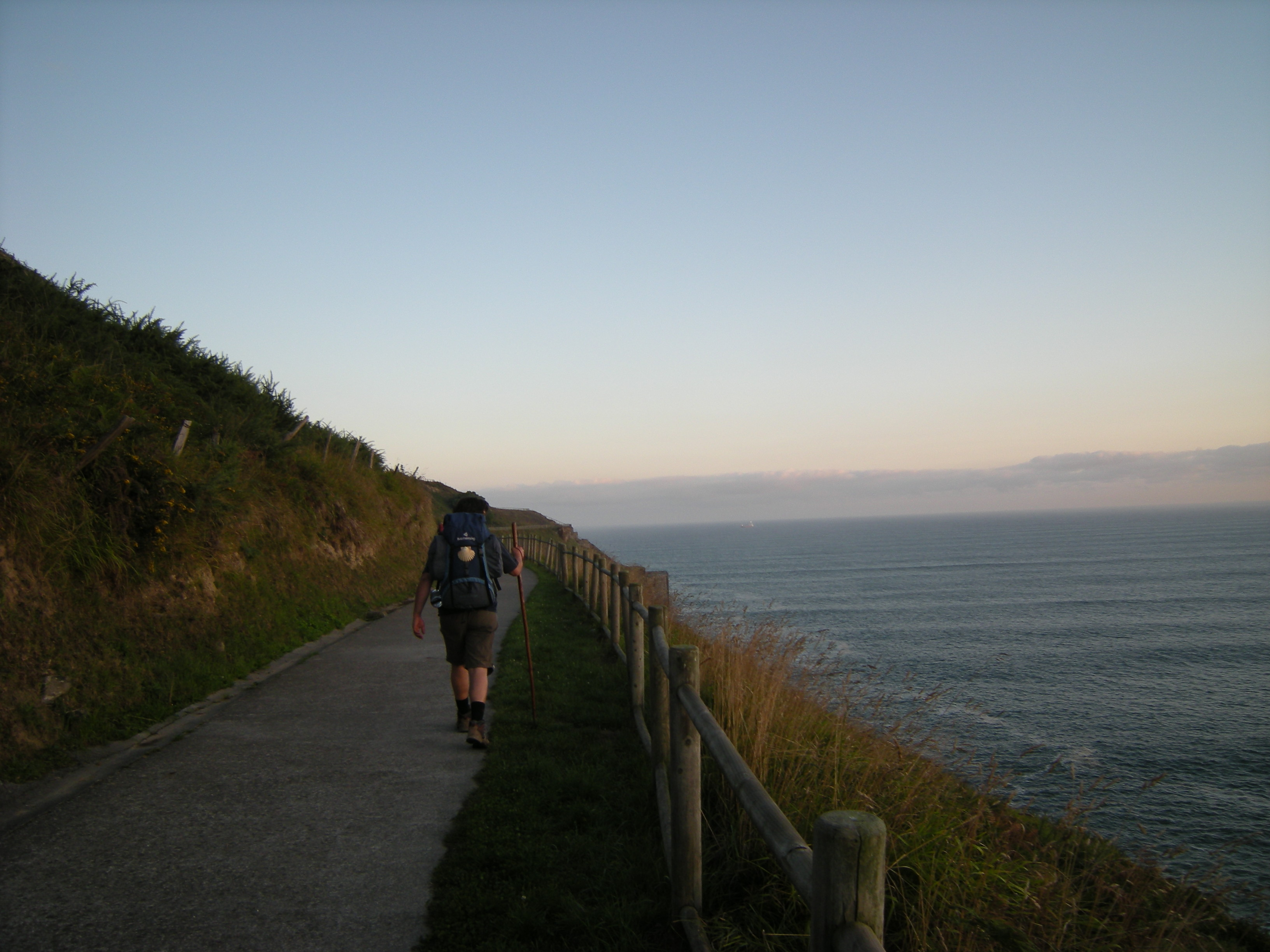
Sea view on el Camino del Norte, approaching Onton

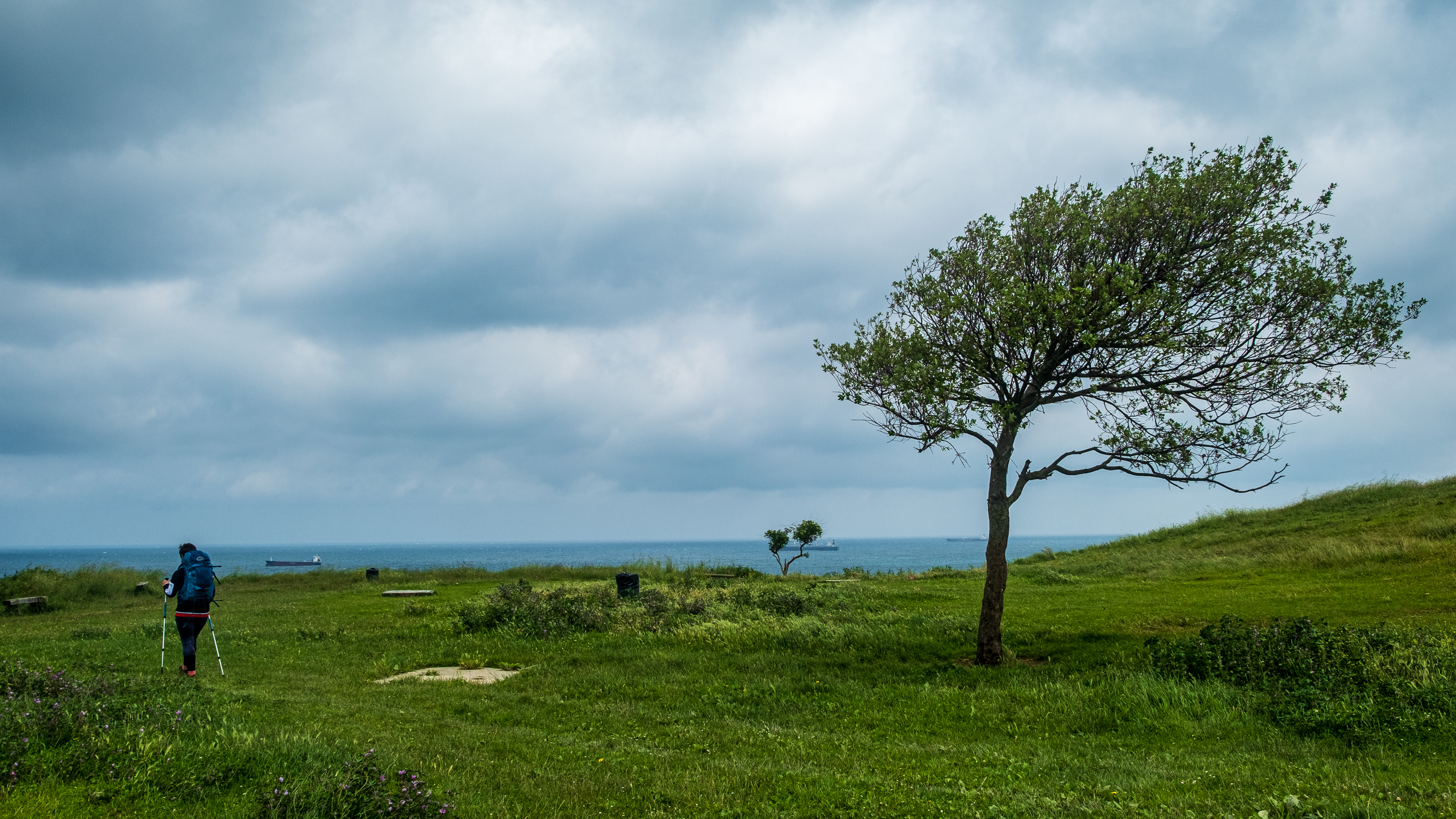
A pilgrim along the northern route of the Camino de Santiago

== See also ==
- Camino de Santiago (route descriptions)
- Codex Calixtinus
- Confraternity of Saint James
- Cross of Saint James
- Dominic de la Calzada
- Grand Tour
- Holy Door
- Japan 100 Kannon Pilgrimage
- Jeju Olle Trail
- Kumano Kodo
- List of Christian pilgrimage sites
- Mary Remnant
- Order of Santiago
- Palatine Ways of St. James
- Path of Miracles
- Shikoku Pilgrimage
- Via Jacobi
- Walking the Camino: Six Ways to Santiago
- World Heritage Sites of the Routes of Santiago de Compostela in France
