= Camino Finisterre =

Way of St. James pilgrimage route in Spain

- Route of the Camino Finisterre
- Location: Galicia (Spain)
- Trailheads: Santiago de Compostela, Fisterra and Muxía
- Use: Hiking
- Difficulty: Medium
- Season: All Year

The Camino Finisterre is a route of the Camino de Santiago. It runs from Santiago de Compostela to Fisterra and Muxía.

Until the end of the Middle Ages, the Costa da Morte was considered the end of the known world. For centuries, this site has been the symbolic end of the Camino de Santiago, where pilgrims conclude their journey.

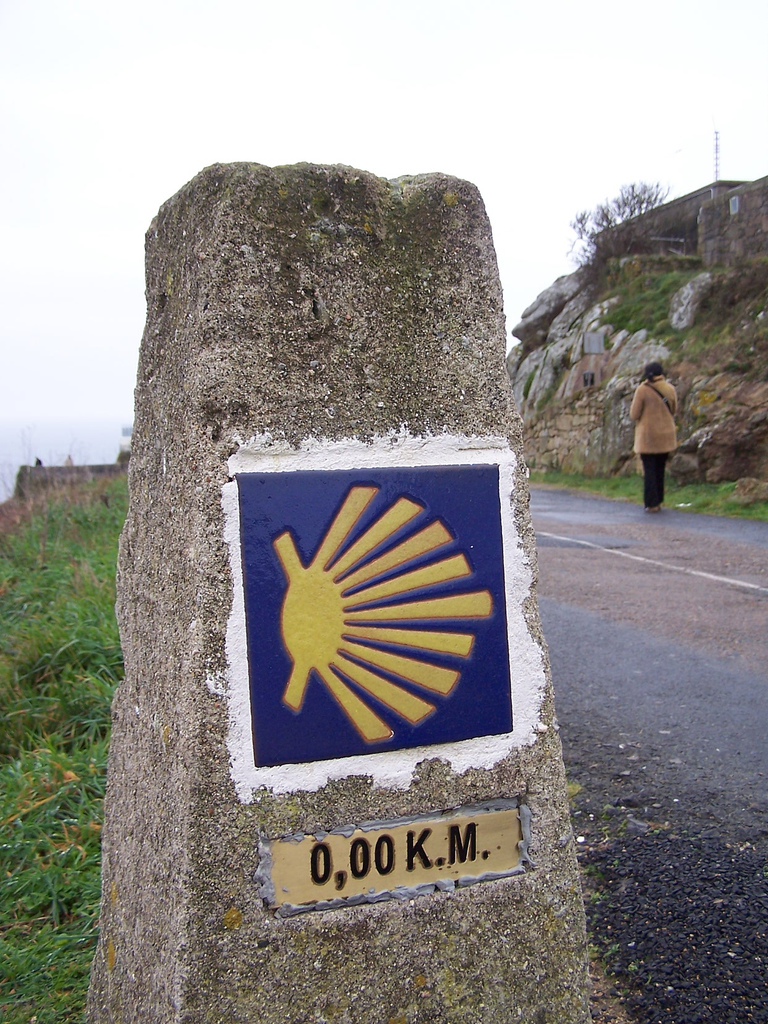
Kilometer zero – the last kilometer of the Way of St. James

The Pilgrim's Office in Santiago publishes data regarding pilgrims who got the certificate. In 2024 about 59% of the pilgrims had a Spanish nationality, followed by Portuguese (6.7%), Italians (4.7%) and US-Americans (3.1%). About 12 people travelled on a horse and two in a wheelchair. Most pilgrims finish this route in July and August.

== Gallery ==
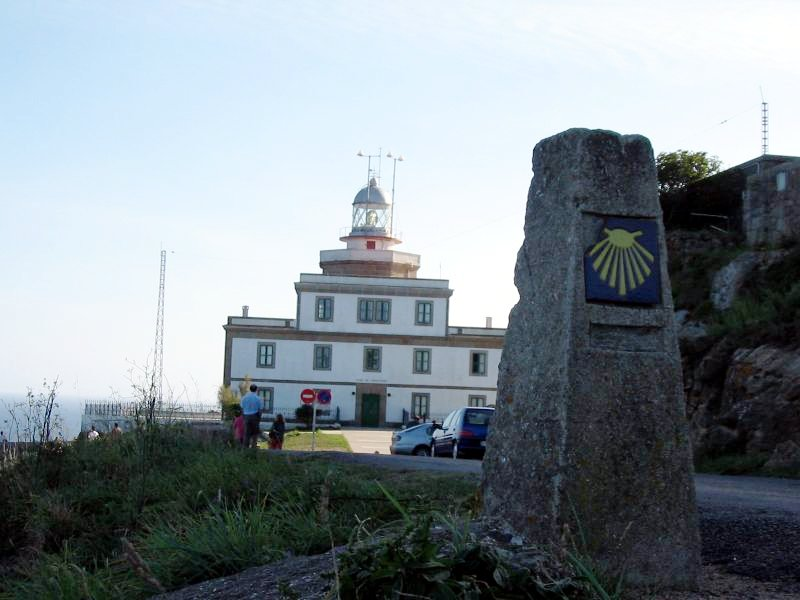
Lighthouse at Cape Finisterre

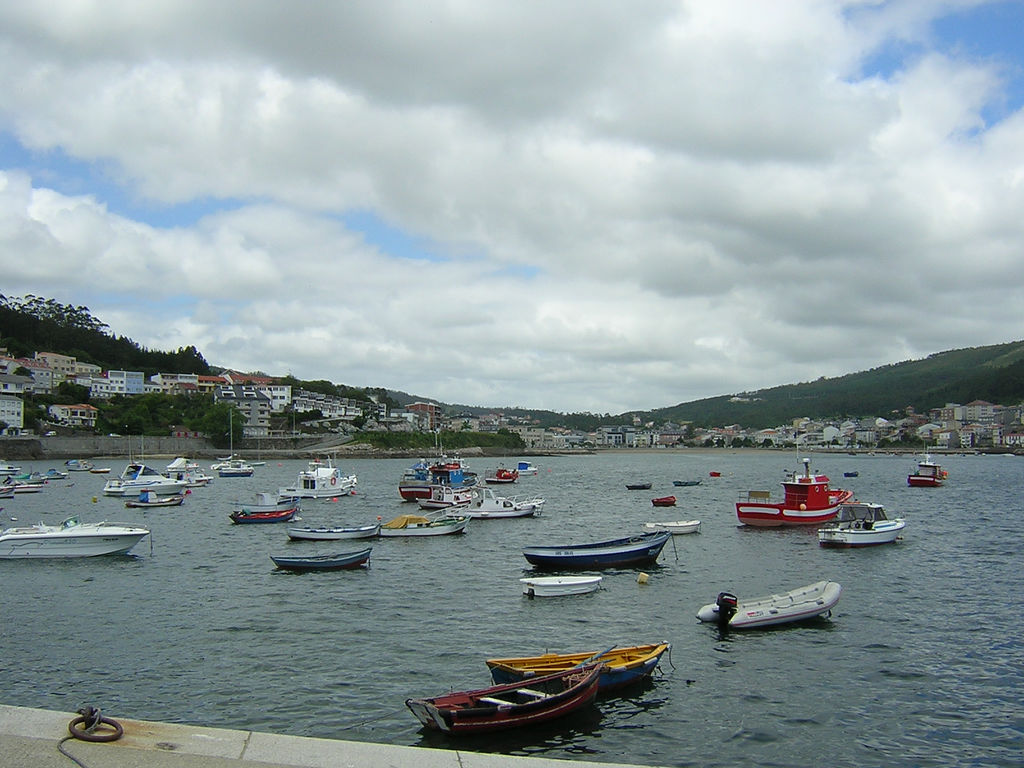
Cee seen from the direction of Corcubión

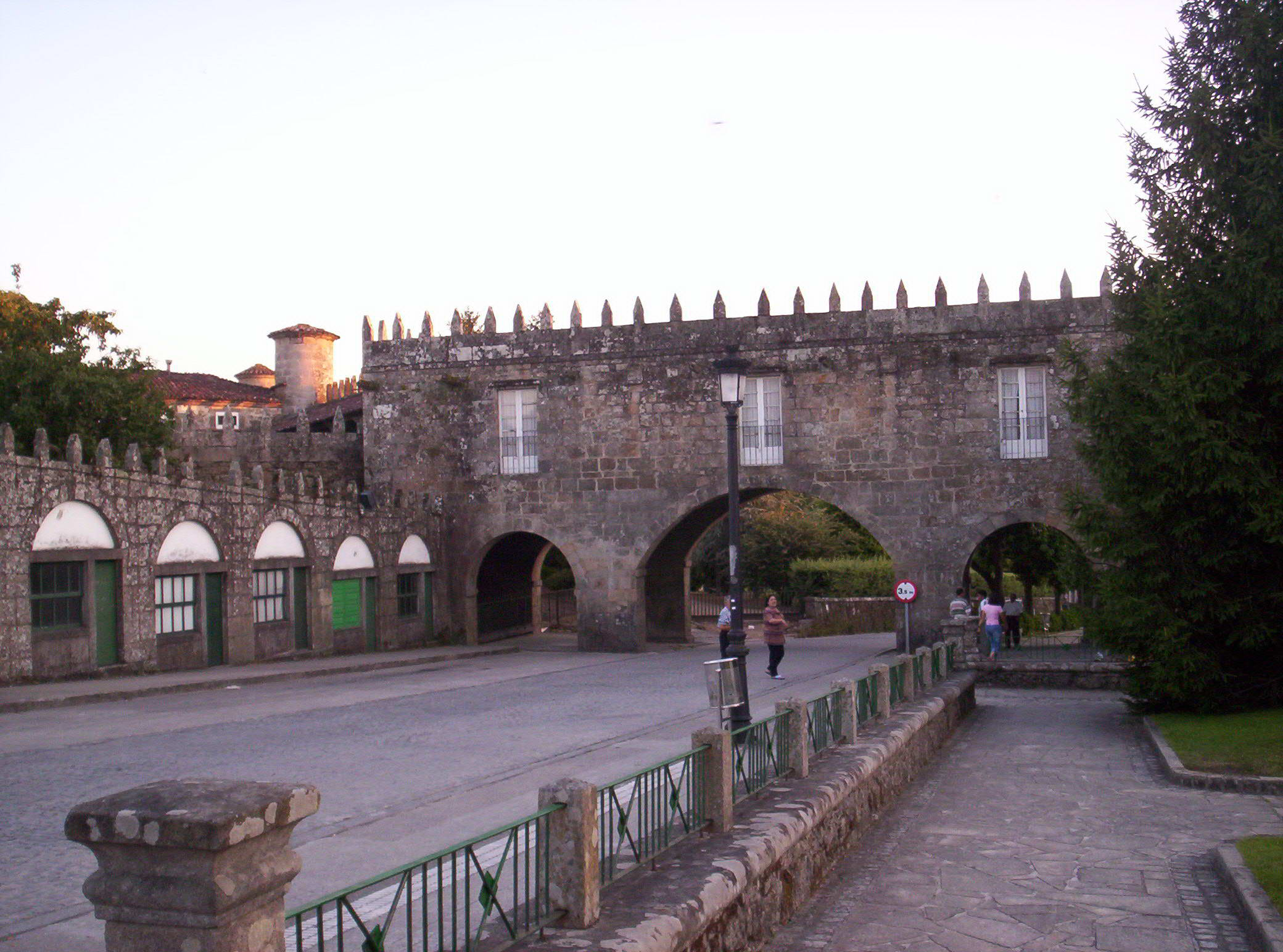
Pazo de O Cotón in Negreira

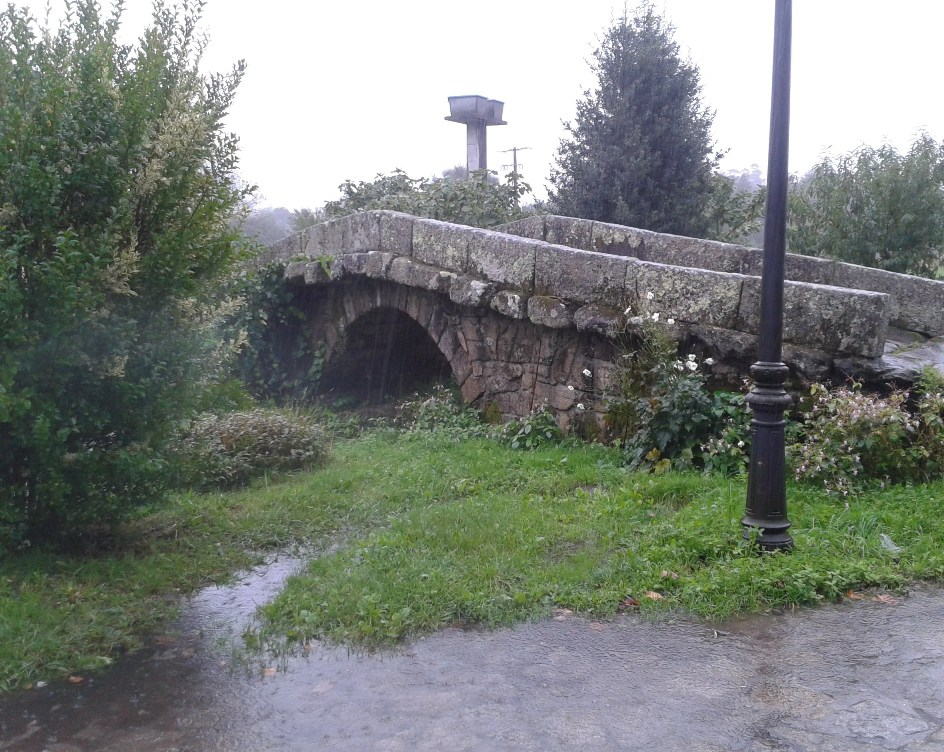
Medieval bridge in Augapesada

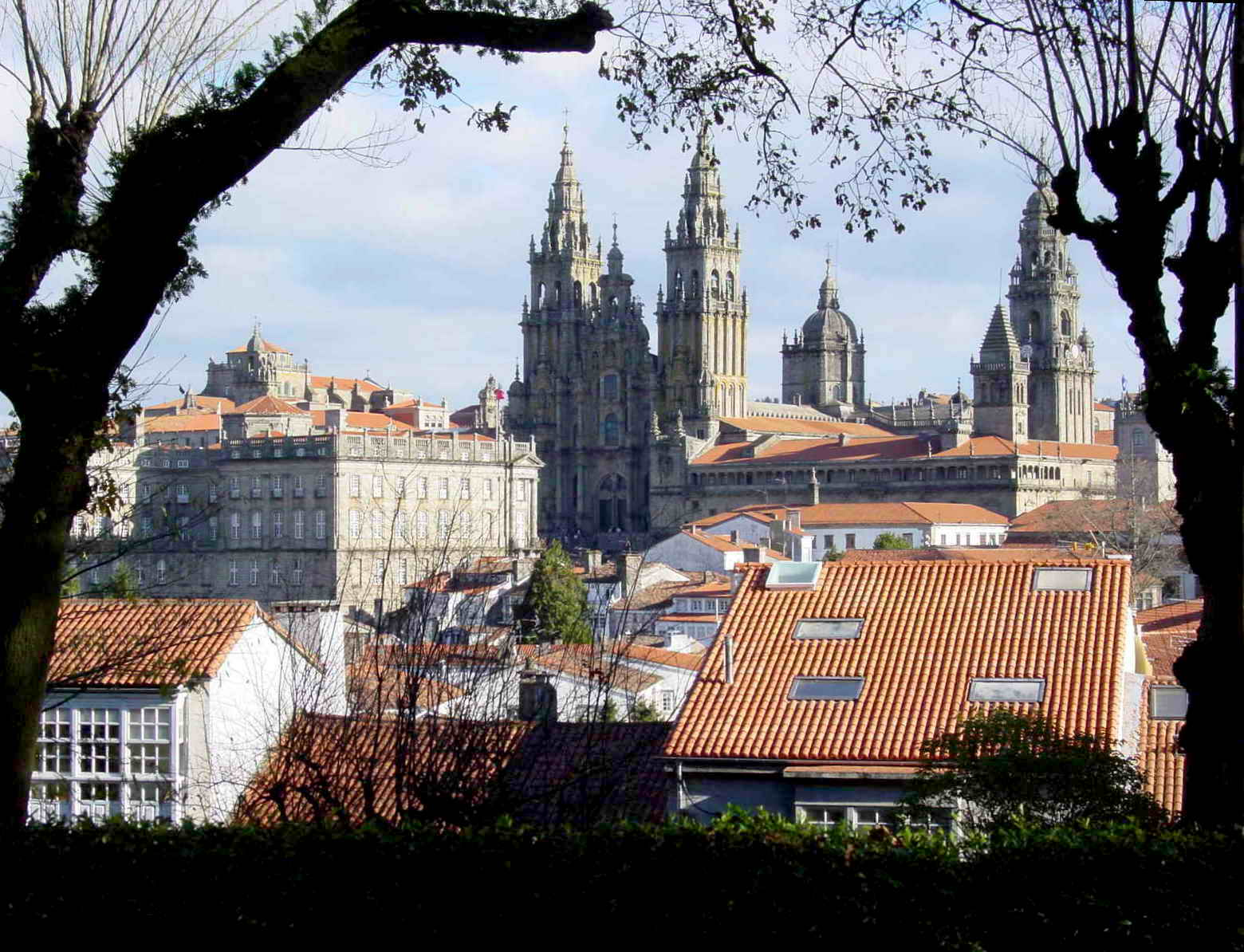
Santiago de Compostela with cathedral
