= Walking the Camino: Six Ways to Santiago =

2013 documentary film by Lydia B. Smith

- Directed by: Lydia B. Smith
- Produced by: Lydia B. Smith
- Release date: 2013
- Running time: 84 minutes
- Countries: U.S. Canada (2013); Spain; Italy; France; Germany; New Zealand; Australia (2015)
- Language: English/Spanish
- Box office: $1,128,878 (worldwide)

Walking the Camino: Six Ways to Santiago is a 2013 documentary film about the Camino de Santiago pilgrimage. It follows different kinds of pilgrims as they attempt to cross Spain on foot with only the essentials and how it changes the lives of the pilgrims. It focuses on how pilgrims throw their whole selves into the trek to Santiago as well as their spiritual experience.

== Release and reception ==
On review aggregation website Rotten Tomatoes, Walking the Camino: Six Ways to Santiago has a rating of 90% based on 18 positive reviews from 20, with an average rating of 6.8/10. Writer Daniel M. Gold of the New York Times stated in his review: "Viewer beware: The impulse to take a hike is strong. Wear sturdy shoes". Stephanie Merry of the Washington Post concluded her review by commenting: "The scenery is so spectacular, rain or shine, that even close-ups of grotesque blisters and pilgrims weeping from pain can't deter a viewer from wanting to see the path for herself. Walking the Camino: Six Ways to Santiago may not be entirely brilliant, but it's at the very least inspiring."
