= Sky father =

Figure type in various religions

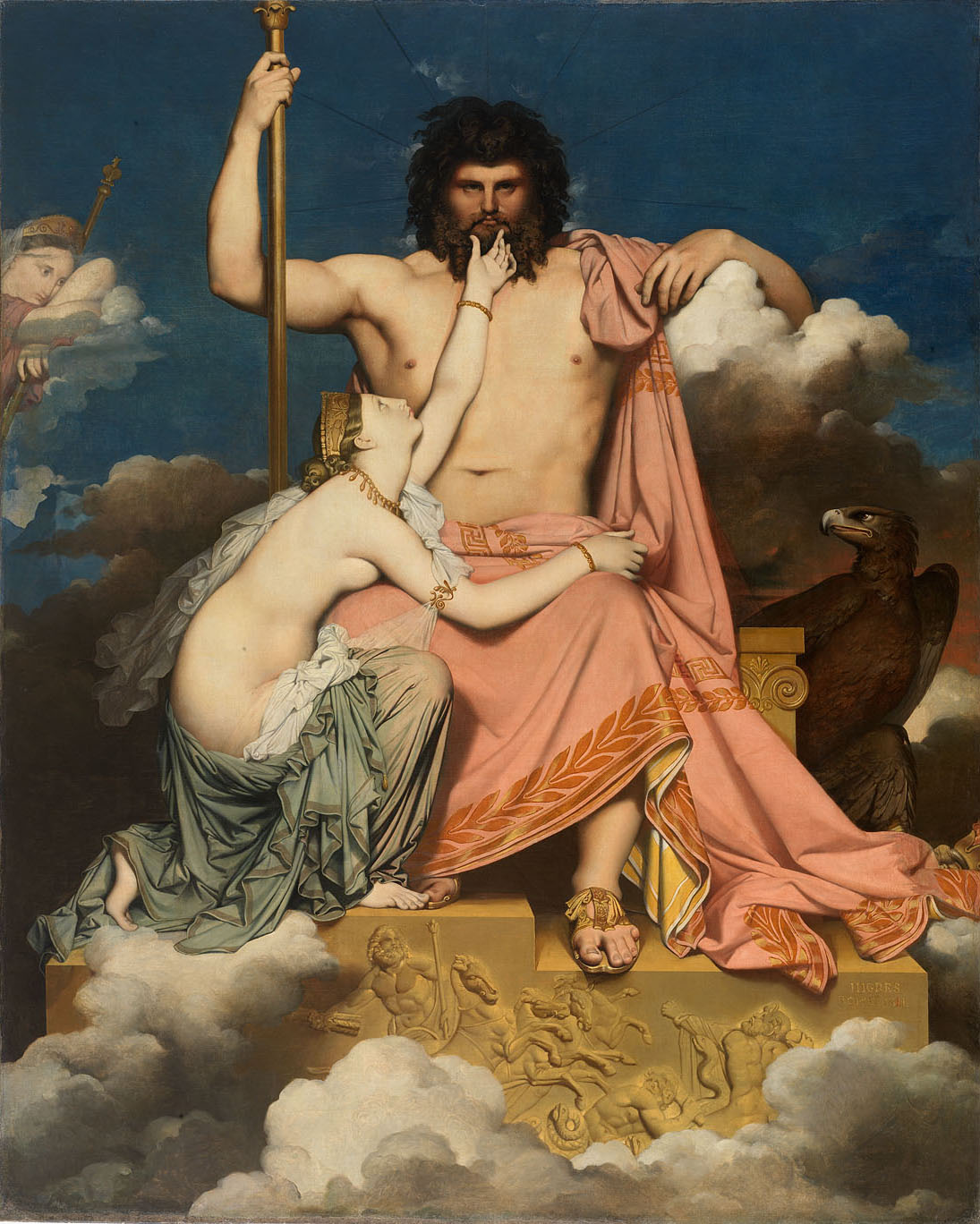
Jupiter, ancient Roman sky deity, and Thetis

In comparative mythology, sky father is a term for a recurring concept in religion of a sky god who is addressed as a "father", often the father of a pantheon and is often either a reigning or former King of the Gods. The concept of "sky father" may also be taken to include Sun gods with similar characteristics, such as Ra. The concept is complementary to an earthly mother goddess.

"Sky Father" is a direct translation of the Vedic Dyaus Pita, etymologically descended from the same Proto-Indo-European deity name as the Greek Zeûs Pater and Roman Jupiter, all of which are reflexes of the same Proto-Indo-European deity's name, *Dyēus Ph₂tḗr. While there are numerous parallels adduced from outside of Indo-European mythology, there are exceptions (e.g. In Egyptian mythology, Nut is the sky mother and Geb is the earth father).

== List of sky fathers ==
| Name | Etymology | Mythology | Parent Mythology | Details |
|---|---|---|---|---|
| Nzambi Ampungu | From the Bantu and Kikongo word nzambi meaning 'supreme god' and ampungu meaning 'great spirit' | Bakongo | African | In traditional Bakongo religion, Nzambi is the supreme creator god, the Sky Father, and god of the Sun. |
| Nyambi | From the Bantu word nzambi meaning 'supreme god' | Bantu | African | In various Bantu cultures, Nyambi is the Supreme Being, the Creator of the universe, the Sky Father, god of the Sun and the source of all life. |
| Aten | | Egyptian | African | Was a Monotheistic Sun God under the pharaoh Akhenaten. |
| Horus | From Late Latin Hōrus, from Ancient Greek Ὧρος (Hôros), from Egyptian ḥr. | Egyptian | African | In Ancient Egypt, Horus was ruler of the sky. He was shown as a male humanoid with the head of a falcon. It is not uncommon for birds to represent the sky in ancient religions, due to their ability to fly. However, in Egyptian mythology the sky was perceived as the goddess Nut. |
| Tengri | Borrowed from a Turkic language; ultimately from Proto-Turkic *teŋri ('sky, heaven, god'). Compare Turkish tanrı ('god'). | Turkic, Mongolic | Altaic | Chief god of the early religion of the Turkic and Mongolic peoples. |
| Wākea | | Hawaiʻian | Austronesian | |
| Ranginui | | Māori | Austronesian | The sky father and earth mother Papatūānuku, embraced and had divine children. |
| Dyaus Pita | From Sanskrit द्यौष्पितृ (dyauṣ-pitṛ). From Proto-Indo-European*Dyḗws ph₂tḗr; synchronically analyzable as द्यौस् (dyaús, nominative singular of द्यु, dyú, 'sky') + पितृ (pitṛ́, 'father'). | Indo-Aryan (Hinduism | Indo-European) | In the early Vedic pantheon, appears already in a marginal position, but in comparative mythology is often reconstructed as having stood alongside Prithvi Mata "Earth Mother" in prehistoric times. |
| Jupiter | From Latin Iūpiter ('father Jove'), from Proto-Italic *djous patēr (literally 'sky father') | Italic | Indo-European | Often depicted by birds, usually the eagle or hawk, and clouds or other sky phenomena. Nicknames included Sky God and Cloud Gatherer. |
| Zeus | From Ancient Greek Ζεύς (Zeús). From Proto-Hellenic *dzéus, related to Mycenaean Greek 𐀇𐀺 (di-wo /diwos/); from Proto-Indo-European *dyḗws. | Hellenic | Indo-European | Often depicted by birds, usually the eagle or hawk, and clouds or other sky phenomena. Nicknames included Sky God and Cloud Gatherer. |
| Ọbatala | From the Yoruba words ọba meaning 'king' and ala meaning 'white cloth' | Yoruba | African | The king of the Oriṣa pantheon, Ọbatala is the creator of the Earth and humanity. He resides in the spirit realm Ọrun usually associated with the sky. He is sometimes referred to as Baba Arayé meaning "Father of all humankind". |
| Dagr | From Proto-Germanic *dagaz ('day, name of the D-rune'). Cognate with Old English dæġ (Modern English day), Old Frisian dei, di, Old Saxon dag, Old Dutch dag, Old High German tac, tag, Gothic 𐌳𐌰𐌲𐍃 (dags). Ultimately from Proto-Indo-European *dʰegʷʰ- ('to burn'). | Nordic | Indo-European | The personification of the daylit sky. |
| Svarog? | Interpreted by some authors as the possible contender for the Slavic Sky Father. Through possible syncetisation with the Indo-European Smith deity (see more at Tvashtr and Proto-Indo-European mythology) | Slavic | Indo-European | Mythological smith who is father of the Sun god, Dazhbog. |
| Diepatura | | Illyrian | Indo-European | |
| Zojz | A derivation of Proto-Indo-European *dyḗws | Albanian | Indo-European | |
| Dievas | From Proto-Baltic *deivas. | Baltic | Indo-European | Primordial supreme god and one of the most important deities. The god of light, the sky, prosperity, wealth, the ruler of gods, and the creator of the universe. |
| Týr | From earlier runic ᛏᛁᚢᛦ (tiuʀ), from Proto-Germanic *Tīwaz; identical to *týr ('god'). From Proto-Indo-European *deywós ('god'). Vṛddhi derivative of *dyew- ('sky, heaven') | Germanic | Indo-European | |
| Bochica | | Muisca | Native American | In what is now Colombia, the Muisca worshipped this sky father. |
| Gitche Manitou | | Native American | Native American | Common character in creation myths. |
| Shangdi | 上帝 (Hanyu Pinyin: shàng dì; literally 'king above') | Confucianism | Sino-Tibetan | Supreme God worshipped in ancient China. It is also used to refer to the Christian God in the Standard Chinese Union Version of the Bible. In China, in Daoism, 天 (tian), meaning sky, is associated with light, the positive, male, etc., whereas 地 (di) meaning earth or land, is associated with dark, the negative, female, etc. |
| Tian | 天 (lit. 'sky' or 'heaven') | Confucianism | Sino-Tibetan | Used to refer to the sky as well as a personification of it. Whether it possesses sentience in the embodiment of an omnipotent, omniscient being is a difficult question for linguists and philosophers. Zhu, Tian Zhu (主, 天主, lit. 'Lord' or 'Lord in Heaven') is translated from the English word, Lord, which is a formal title of the Christian God in Mainland China's Christian churches. |
| Tianfu | 天父 (Hanyu Pinyin: tiān fù) | Taoism | Sino-Tibetan | Another word used to refer to the Christian God in the Standard Chinese Union Version of the Bible. |
| An or Anu | (Akkadian: 𒀭𒀭, romanized: Anu, from 𒀭 an, 'sky, heaven') or Anum, originally An (Sumerian: 𒀭, romanized: An) | Sumerian, Assyrian and Babylonian | Sumerian, Assyrian and Babylonian | The father deity of the Sumerian and Assyro-Babylonian pantheon and is also the earliest attested Sky Father deity. |
| Ukko | From Proto-Finnic *ukko. Probably a Finnic pet form of *uros ('man, male'). | Finnish | Uralic | |
| Taevaisa | Taevas 'sky', isa 'father' | | Uralic | The word by which adherents in Estonia of the Maausk (faith of the land) and the Taara native beliefs refer to God. Although both branches of the original Estonian religion — which are largely just different ways of approaching what is in essence the same thing, to the extent that it remains extant — are pantheistic, heaven has a definite and important place in the ancient pre-Christian Estonian belief system. All things are sacred for those of the faith of the land, but the idea of a sky father — among other "sacrednesses" — is something all Estonians are well aware of. In newer history, after the arrival of Christianity, the ideas of a sky father and "a father who art in heaven" have become somewhat conflated. One way or another, the phrase taevaisa remains in common use in Estonia. |
| Urcia | | Basque | Vasconic | The Liber Sancti Iacobi by Aymericus Picaudus tells that the Basques called God Urcia, a word found in compounds for the names of some week days and meteorological phenomena. The current usage is Jaungoikoa, that can be interpreted as 'the lord of above'. The grammatical imperfection of the word leads some to conjecture that it is a folk etymology applied to jainkoa, now considered a shorter synonym. |

== See also ==
- Mother goddess
- Earth deity
- Sky deity
- Thunder god
- Worship of heavenly bodies
