= *Dyēus =

Father Sky-god in Proto-Indo-European mythology

- Sky
- Venerated in: Proto-Indo-European mythology
- Consort: *Dʰéǵʰōm
- Offspring: *H₂éwsōs

Equivalents
- Albanian: Zojz
- Greek: Zeus
- Hindu: Dyaus
- Roman: Jupiter
- Messapic: Zis
- Germanic: Týr
- Baltic: Dievas
- Illyrian: Deipaturos
- Luwian: Tiwaz

*Dyḗus (lit. 'daylight'), also *Dyḗus ph₂tḗr (lit. 'father daylight'), is the reconstructed name of the daylight-sky god in Proto-Indo-European mythology. *Dyēus was conceived as a divine personification of the bright sky of the day and the seat of the gods, the *deywṓs. Associated with the vast diurnal sky and with the fertile rains, *Dyēus was often paired with *Dʰéǵʰōm, the Earth Mother, in a relationship of union and contrast.

While its existence is not directly attested by archaeological or written materials, *Dyēus is considered by scholars the most securely reconstructed deity of the Indo-European pantheon, as identical formulas referring to him can be found among the subsequent Indo-European languages and myths of the Vedic Indo-Aryans, Latins, Greeks, Phrygians, Messapians, Thracians, Illyrians, Albanians and Hittites.

== Name ==
=== Etymology ===
The divine name *Dyēus derives from the stem *dyeu-, denoting the "diurnal sky" or the "brightness of the day" (in contrast to the darkness of the night), an expanded form of the root *di or dey- ("to shine, be bright"). Cognates in Indo-European languages revolving around the concepts of "day", "sky" and "deity" and sharing the root *dyeu- as an etymon, such as Sanskrit dyumán- 'heavenly, shining, radiant', suggest that Dyēus referred to the vast and bright sky of the day conceived as a divine entity among Proto-Indo-European speakers.

A vṛddhi-derivative appears in *deywós ("celestial"), the common word for "god" in Proto-Indo-European. In classic Indo-European, associated with the late Khvalynsk culture (3900–3500 BCE), *Dyēus also had the meaning of "Heaven", whereas it denoted "god" in general (or the Sun-god in particular) in the Anatolian tradition. The suffix-derivative *diwyós ("divine") is also attested in Latin, Greek and Sanskrit.

The noun *deynos ("day"), interpreted as a back-formation of *deywós, has descendant cognates in Albanian din ("break of the day"), Vedic Sanskrit dína- "day" and divé-dive ("day by day"), Lithuanian dienà and Latvian dìena ("day"), Slavic dъnъ ("day") or Slavic Poludnitsa ("Lady Midday"), Latin Dies, goddess of the day and counterpart to Greek Hemera, Hittite siwat ("day"), Palaic Tīyat- ("Sun, day"), Ancient Greek endios ("midday"), Old Armenian tiw (տիւ, "bright day"), Old Irish noenden ("nine-day period"), Welsh heddyw ("today").

While the Greek goddess Pandeia or Pandia (Ancient Greek: Πανδία, Πανδεία, "all brightness") may have been another name for the Moon Goddess Selene, her name still preserves the root *di-/*dei-, meaning "to shine, be bright".

=== Epithets ===
The most constant epithet associated with *Dyēus is "father" (*ph₂tḗr). The term "Father Dyēus" was inherited in the Vedic Dyáuṣ Pitṛ́, Greek Zeus Patēr, Illyrian Dei-pátrous, Roman Jupiter (*Djous patēr), even in the form of "dad" or "papa" in the Scythian Papaios for Zeus, or the Palaic expression Tiyaz papaz. The epithet *Ph₂tḗr Ǵenh_{1}-tōr ("Father Procreator") is also attested in the Vedic, Iranian, Greek, and perhaps the Roman ritual traditions.

== Role ==
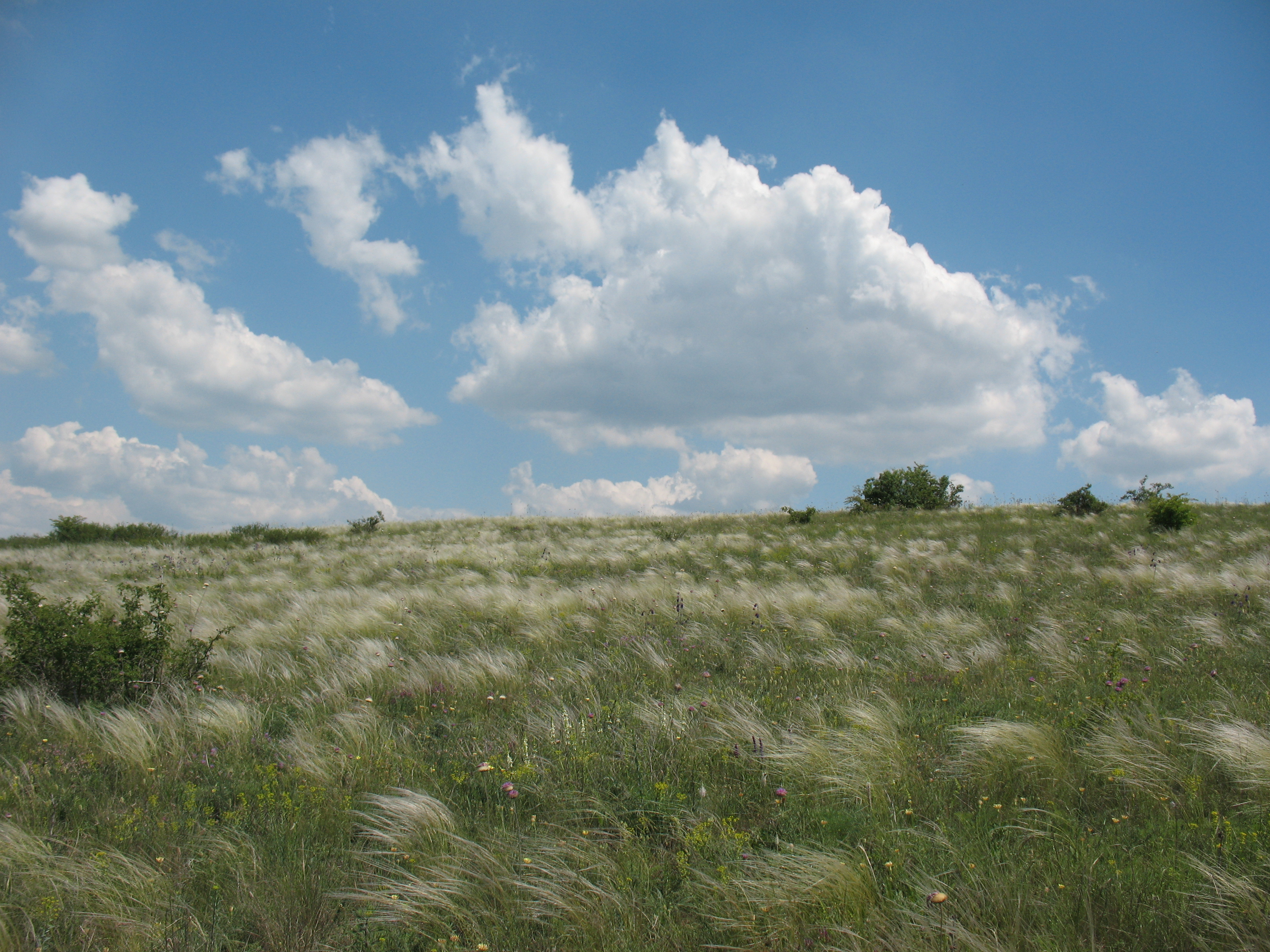
The sky over the feather grass-covered steppe in Ukraine. *Dyḗus ph₂tḗr has been translated as "father daylight-sky-god"

*Dyēus was the Sky or Day conceived as a divine entity, and thus the dwelling of the gods, the Heaven. As the gateway to the deities and the father of both the Divine Twins and the goddess of the Dawn (*H₂éwsōs), *Dyēus was a prominent deity in the Proto-Indo-European pantheon. He was likely not their ruler or the holder of the supreme power like Zeus and Jupiter.

*Dyēus was associated with the bright and vast sky, but also to the cloudy weather in the Vedic and Greek formulas *Dyēus' rain. Although several reflexes of Dyēus are storm deities, such as Zeus and Jupiter, this is thought to be a late development exclusive to Mediterranean traditions, probably derived from syncretism with Canaanite deities and the Proto-Indo-European god *Perkʷūnos.

Due to his celestial nature, *Dyēus is often described as "all-seeing" or "with wide vision" in Indo-European myths. It is unlikely however that he was in charge of the supervision of justice and righteousness, as it was the case for Zeus or the Indo-Iranian Mithra–Varuna duo, but he was suited to serve at least as a witness to oaths and treaties. Proto-Indo-Europeans also visualized the sun as the "lamp of Dyēus" or the "eye of Dyēus", as seen in various reflexes: "the god's lamp" in Euripides' Medea, "heaven's candle" in Beowulf, "the land of Hatti's torch" (the Sun-goddess of Arinna) in a Hittite prayer, Helios as the eye of Zeus, Hvare-khshaeta as the eye of Ahura Mazda, and the sun as "God's eye" in Romanian folklore.

=== Consort ===
*Dyēus is often paired with *Dʰéǵʰōm, the Earth goddess, and described as uniting with her to ensure the growth and sustenance of terrestrial life; the earth becomes pregnant as the rain falls from the sky. The relationship between Father Sky (*Dyēus Ph₂tḗr) and Mother Earth (*Dʰéǵʰōm Méh₂tēr) is also of contrast. Mother Earth is portrayed as the vast and dark dwelling of mortals, located below the bright seat of the gods. According to Jackson, as the thunder-god is frequently associated with the fructifying rains, she may be a more fitting partner of *Perkʷūnos than of *Dyēus.

While Hausos and the Divine Twins are generally considered the offsprings of *Dyēus alone, some scholars have proposed a spouse-goddess reconstructed as *Diwōnā or *Diuōneh₂, with a possible descendant in Zeus's consort Dione. A thematic echo occurs in the Vedic tradition as Indra's wife Indrānī displays a similar jealous and quarrelsome disposition under provocation. A second descendant may be found in Dia, a mortal said to unite with Zeus in a Greek myth. After the mating of Dia's husband Ixion with the phantom of Hera, the spouse of Zeus, the story leads ultimately to the birth of the Centaurs, who may be seen as reminiscent of the Divine Twins, sons of *Dyēus.

Another reflex may be found in the Mycenaean Greek Diwia, possibly a feminine counterpart of Zeus attested in the second part of the 2nd millennium BC and which may have survived in the Pamphylian dialect of Asia Minor. The reconstruction is however only based upon the Greek—and to a lesser extent the Vedic—tradition, and it remains therefore not secured.

If the female goddesses Hera, Juno, Frigg and Shakti share a common association with marriage and fertility, Mallory and Adams note that "these functions are much too generic to support the supposition of a distinct PIE 'consort goddess' and many of the 'consorts' probably represent assimilations of earlier goddesses who may have had nothing to do with marriage."

== Evidence ==
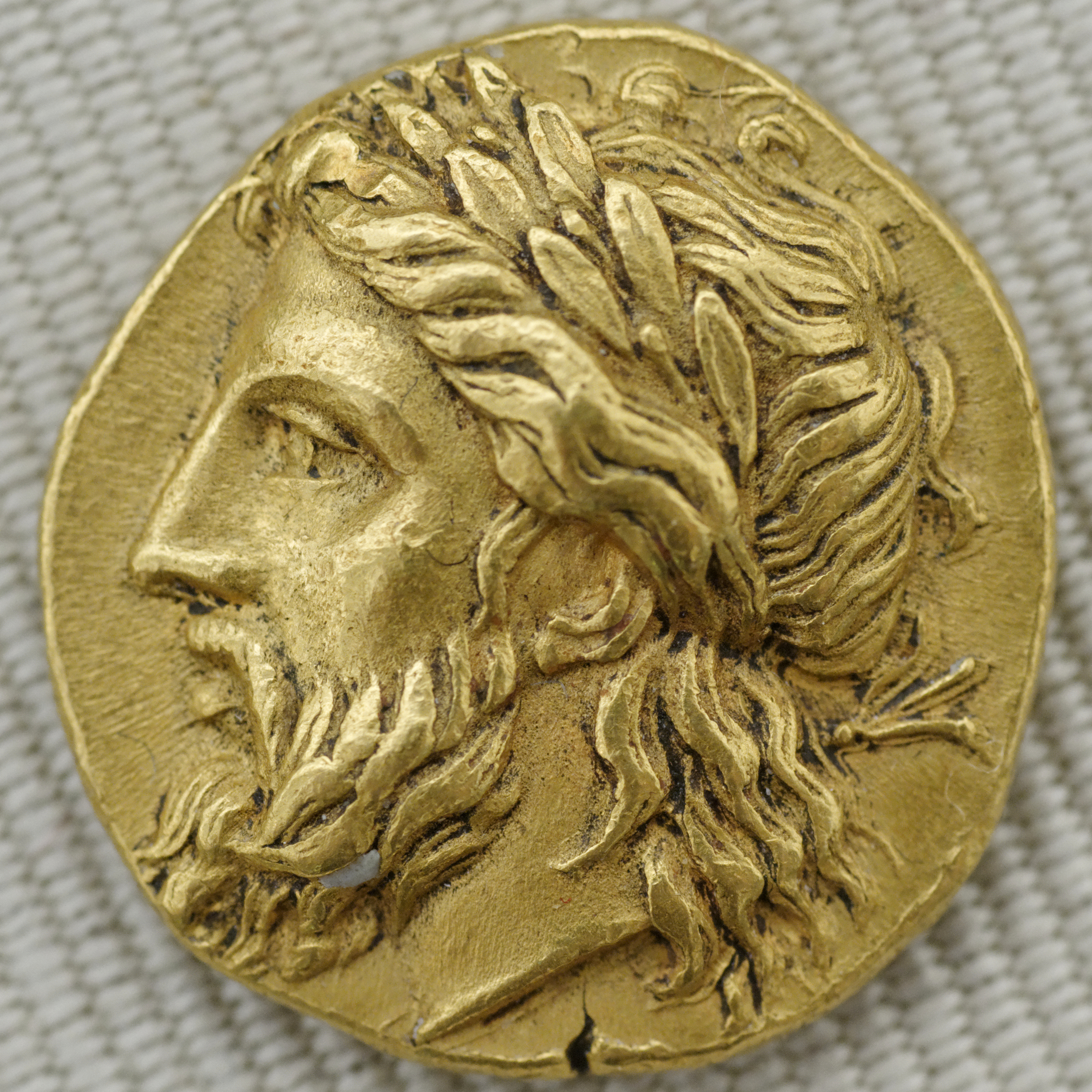
A laurel-wreathed head of Zeus, c 360–340 BC.

Cognates deriving either from the stem *dyeu- ("daylight, bright sky"), the epithet *Dyēus Ph_{2}ter ("Father Sky"), the vṛddhi-derivative *deiwós ("celestial", a "god"), the derivative *diwyós ("divine"), or the back-formation *deynos (a "day") are among the most widely attested in Indo-European languages.

=== Descendants ===
- PIE: *d(e)i-, 'to shine, be bright',
  - PIE: *dyēus, the daylight-sky god,
    - Indo-Iranian: *dyauš,
      - Sanskrit: Dyáuṣ (द्यौष्), the god of Heaven, and dyú (द्यु), the common word for "heaven",
      - Old Avestan: dyaoš (𐬛𐬫𐬀𐬊𐬱), "heaven", mentioned in a single verse of the Avesta; Young Avestan: diiaoš, "hell", as a result of the Zoroastrian religious reformation,
    - Mycenaean Greek: di-we (𐀇𐀸 /diwei/), dative case of an otherwise scarcely attested name,
      - Cypriot Syllabary: ti-wo, interpreted as pertaining to Zeus, and the possible genitive Diwoi,
        - Greek: Zeus (Ζεύς; gen. Diós), the god of the Sky; also Boeotian Lac., Corinth., Rhod. dialects: Deús (Δεύς),
    - Italic: *d(i)jous,
      - Old Latin: Dioue (or loue), Dijovis (diovis),
        - Latin: Jove (Iove; gen. Iovis), the god of the Sky;
        - Latin: Diūs, the god of oaths (from *dijous < *diyēus),
      - Oscan: Diúvei (Διουϝει), genitive singular,
      - Umbrian: Di or Dei (Grabouie/Graboue), attested in the Iguvine Tablets,
      - Paelignian: Ioviois (Pvclois) and Ioveis (Pvcles), interpreted as a calque of the Greek theonym Diós-kouroi,
    - Anatolian: *diéu-, *diu-, a "god",
      - Hittite: šīuš (𒅆𒍑), a "god" or the Sun-God; Šiwat, Hittite personification of day; (Note: Despite deriving from PIE *diēu- '(sky) light', the word was reinterpreted in Anatolian to name a sun god, such as Luwian Tiwaz and Palaic Tiyaz.) another deity named Šiušummiš is mentioned in the Anitta text.
      - Palaic: tiuna, "divine, a god",
      - Lydian: ciw-, a "god"; Lefs or Lévs, the Lydian Zeus.
    - Proto-Armenian: *Tiw, the Sky- or Thunder-god,
      - Armenian: tiw (Տիւ), "day, daytime, morning" and ti, "day" (only in erk-ti "two days"); and possibly also ciacan "rainbow" (according to Martirosyan, from *Ti(w)-a- attached to *can- "sign, omen", thus "the sign of the Sky/Thunder-god"),
    - Illyrian: dei-, meaning "heaven" or "God", as in Dei-pátrous, the "sky-father",
    - Proto-Messapic: *dyēs,
      - Messapic: Zis or Dis, the sky-god,
    - Albanian: Zojz, a sky and lightning god; the root *d(e)i- may also be found in Perën-di "Heaven", "God" (with a suffix -di attached to per-en-, an extension of PIE *per- "to strike"),
    - Thracian: Zi-, Diu-, and Dias- (in personal names),
    - Phrygian: Tiy-,
    - Bithynia: Tiyes and the place name Tium (Τιεῖον).

=== "Sky-Father" epithet ===
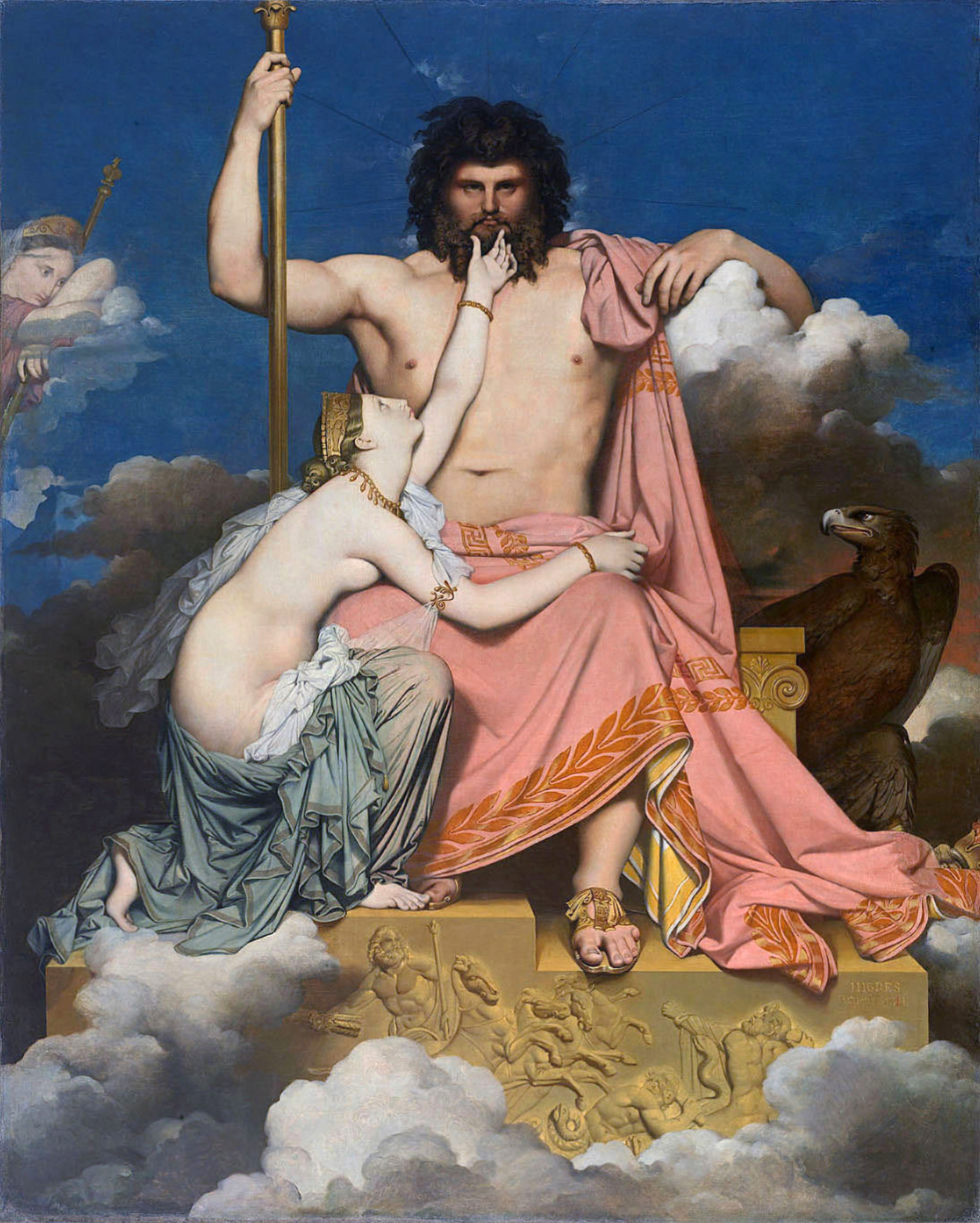
The Roman god Jupiter (Iovis-pater), 1811.

Ritual and formulaic expressions stemming from the form *Dyēus Ph_{2}ter ("Father Dyēus") were inherited in the following liturgic and poetic traditions:

- PIE: *dyēus ph_{2}tḗr, 'Father Sky' (voc. *dyeu ph_{2}ter, "O Father Sky"),
  - Greek: Zeus Patēr (Ζεῦς πατήρ; voc. Ζεῦ πάτερ),
  - Indo-Iranian: *Dyauš-pHtar,
    - Vedic: Dyáuṣ-pitā́ (voc. Dyáuṣ-pitṛ́, द्यौष्पितृ),
  - Italic: *Djous-patēr > *Dijēs-patēr (voc. *Djow-patēr),
    - Old Latin: Dies Pater,
      - Latin: Diespiter (from *Dijēs-patēr); Iūpiter (from *Djow-patēr), archaic Iovispater, later Iuppiter,
    - Oscan: Dípatír, Umbrian: Iupater (dat. Iuve patre), South Picene: dipater (gen. dipoteres),
  - Illyrian: Deipaturos, recorded by Hesychius as Δειπάτυροϛ (Deipáturos), a god worshiped in Tymphaea.

Other reflexes are variants that have retained both linguistic descendants of the stem *dyeu- ("sky") alongside the original structure "Father God". Some traditions have replaced the epithet *ph_{2}ter with the nursery word papa ("dad, daddy"):

- Luwian: Tātis tiwaz, "Daddy Tiwaz", the Sun-god,
- Palaic: Tiyaz papaz, "Papa Tiyaz", the Sun-god,
- Scythian: Papaios (Papa Zios), "father Zeus", the god of the Sky,
- Old Irish: in Dagdae Oll-athair, "Great Father the Dagda" (from the Proto-Celtic formula *sindos dago-dēwos ollo fātir, "Great Father the Good God").

Other variants are less secured:

- Hittite: attas Isanus, "Father Sun-god"; the name of the sky-god was replaced with a Hattic sun-god loan, but the original structure of the formula left intact,
- Latvian: Debess tēvs, "Father of Heaven",
- Old Norse: Óðinn Alföðr, "Odin, All-Father" or "Odin Father of All",
- Russian: Stribogŭ, "Father God",
- Albanian: Zot, "lord" or "God", epithet of Zojz, the sky-father (generally thought to be derived from Proto-Albanian *dźie̅u ̊ a(t)t-, "heavenly father"; although the etymology *w(i)tš- pati-, "lord of the house", has also been proposed),
- Tokharian B: kauṃ-ñäkte, 'sun, sun-god'.

=== "Celestial" derivations ===
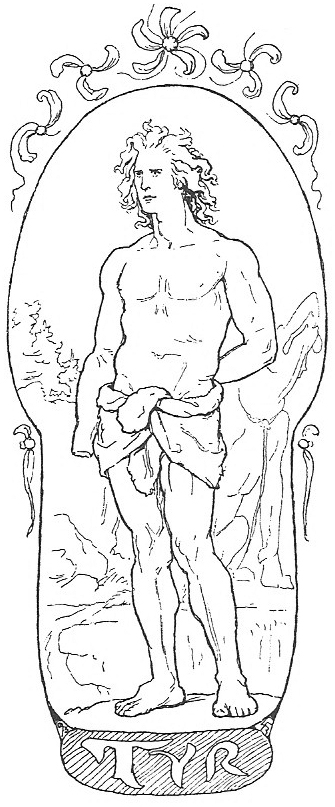
The Germanic god Týr, 1895.

Cognates stemming from *deywós, a vṛddhi-derivation of *dyēus (the sky-god), are attested in the following traditions:

- PIE: *deywós (lit. skyling, pl. *deywṓs), meaning "celestial, heavenly one", hence a "god",
  - Indo-Iranian: *daivá (daiua), a "god",
    - Sanskrit: devá (देव), meaning "heavenly, divine, anything of excellence", and devi, female title meaning "goddess";
    - Avestan: daēva (𐬛𐬀𐬉𐬎𐬎𐬀, daēuua), a term for "demons" in Zoroastrianism, as a result of a religious reformation that degraded the status of prior deities,
      - Old Persian: daiva meaning "false deities, demons",
  - Balto-Slavic: *deiwas,
    - Baltic: *deivas,
      - Old Lithuanian: Deivas,
        - Lithuanian: Diēvas, supreme god of the sky,
      - Old Prussian: Dìews (or Deywis), Latvian: Dievs, and the Baltic Dievaitis ("Little God" or "Prince"), a name used to refer to the Thunder God Perkūnas, or to the Moon God Mėnuo.
  - Germanic: *tīwaz (pl. *tīwōz), a word for "god" that probably also served as a title (*Tīwaz, "God") that came to be associated with a specific deity whose original name is now lost,
    - Late Proto-Germanic *Tiwasdag, a calque of Latin dies Martis which gave the word for 'Tuesday' in Old Norse Týs-dagr, Old English Tīwes-dæg, Old Frisian Tīesdi, and Old High German Zies-tag; interpreted as a remnant of the sky and war functions of *Tīwaz by G. Kroonen, although M. L. West views it as unlikely,
      - Old Norse: Týr, associated with justice; the plural tívar survived as a poetic word for 'the gods', and týr appears in kennings for Odin and Thor, such as in the Odin's names Sigtýr ("victory-god"), Gautatýr ("god of the Geats"), Fimbultýr ("powerful god"), or Hertýr ("army-god"),
      - Old English: Tīw (or Tīg), Old High German: Zio (or *Ziu), a god,
      - Gothic: *Teiws, a deity reconstructed from the associated rune ᛏ (Tyz),
  - Italic: *deiwos, a "god, a deity",
    - Old Latin: deivos (deiuos), the "gods",
      - Latin: deus, common name for a "god, a deity"; and Dea ("goddess"), a title assigned to various Roman goddesses like Dea Tacita, Bona Dea or Dea Dia ("Goddess of the Daylight" or "Bright Goddess").
        - Vulgar Latin: Deus, the god of Christianity in the Vetus Latina and the Vulgate,
    - Oscan: deivas, Venetic: deivos, "gods",
    - Volscian: deue Decluna, attested in an inscription from Velitrae, possibly from the 3rd century BC.
  - Celtic: *dēwos, a "god, a deity", and *dago-dēwos, the "good god", old name of the Dagda,
    - Celtiberian: teiuo, a "god",
    - Gaulish: dēuos, a "god",
      - Gaulish: Devona (/deuona/) or Divona (/diuona/), a deity of sacred waters, springs, and rivers whose name means "Divine",
    - Old Welsh: Dubr Duiu ("Water of the Divinity"), evolving into Mod. Welsh Dyfrdwy (River Dee, Wales). The form deva, diva ("goddess") likewise appears in Celtic river names throughout Western Europe, such as in the Scottish rivers Dēoúa (modern-day Dee, Galloway), and Dēouana (Δηουανα; modern-day Don, Aberdeenshire),
    - Old Irish: día, a "god", and An Dag-da, the druid-god of wisdom,
      - Irish: Dhe ("god"), attested in the modern Sùil Dhé mhóir prayer ("The eye of the great God", in reference to the Sun), featured in Carmina Gadelica.
  - Messapic: deiva, dīva, "goddess",
  - Phrygian: devos.

Other cognates are less secured:

- Slavic: *diva (> *dîvo), perhaps a word for a "good deity" which progressively took the meaning of "miracle", hence "evil being",
  - Old Church Slavonic: divo, Old Polish: dziwo, Russian: dívo, Serbo-Croatian: dîvo, "miracle(s)",
  - OCS: divŭ, "demon", South Slavic: div, "giant, demonic being", Czech: divo-žena, "sorceress, witch", Slovak: divo, "monster", although the Proto-Slavic root *divŭ(jĭ) ("wild") has also been proposed,
  - Polish: Dziewanna, Sorbian: Dživica, Slavic equivalent of Diana, however, other etymologies have been proposed.
- Lusitanian: Reo, an unknown deity.
  - Lusitanian: Deiba and Deibo, attested in votive inscriptions of altars; taken to mean the "local" or "indigenous" pronunciations of Deae and Deo.

=== "Divine" derivations ===
Other cognates deriving from the adjective *diwyós (*dyeu "sky" + yós, a thematic suffix) are attested in the following traditions:

- PIE: *diwyós, meaning "divine, heavenly, godlike",
  - Mycenaean Greek: di-wi-jo (/diwjos/), di-wi-ja (/diwja/),
    - Greek: dîos (δῖος), "belonging to heaven, godlike", also "belonging to Zeus" in tragedies; feminine Día (Δῖα < *Díw-ya), a goddess venerated in classical times at Phlius and Sicyon, and possibly identified with Hebe, the cup-bearer of the gods,
  - Indo-Iranian: *diuiHa- / diuiia-,
    - Sanskrit: divyá, "heavenly",
    - Avestan: daeuuiia, "devilish, diabolic",
  - Proto-Italic: *dīwī (dat.abl.pl. dīwīs),
    - Latin: dīvus, dīvī, "divine, heavenly, godlike",
      - Latin: Dīs Pater, from dīves (gen. dītis), meaning "wealthy, rich", probably derived from *dīwīs > dīvus via the intermediate form *dīw-(o)t- or *dīw-(e)t- ("who is like the gods, protected by the gods"), with contraction *īwi- > ī. According to de Vaan, "the occurrence of the deity Dīs together with pater may be due to association with Di(e)spiter."
    - Latin: dīus, dīā, another adjective with the same meaning, probably based on *dīwī > diī (dat.abl.pl. dīs),
      - Latin: Diāna (from an older Dīāna), goddess of the moon and the countryside.

Other cognates are less secured:

- Paleo-Balkan:
  - Albanian: zana "nymph, goddess".
  - Romanian: zână "fairy, goddess".

== Legacy ==
As the pantheons of the individual mythologies related to Proto-Indo-European religion evolved, attributes of *Dyēus seem to have been redistributed to other deities. In Greek and Roman mythology, *Dyēus was the chief god. The etymological continuant of Dyēus became a very abstract god in Vedic mythology, and his original prominence over other gods largely diluted.

=== In Albanian tradition ===
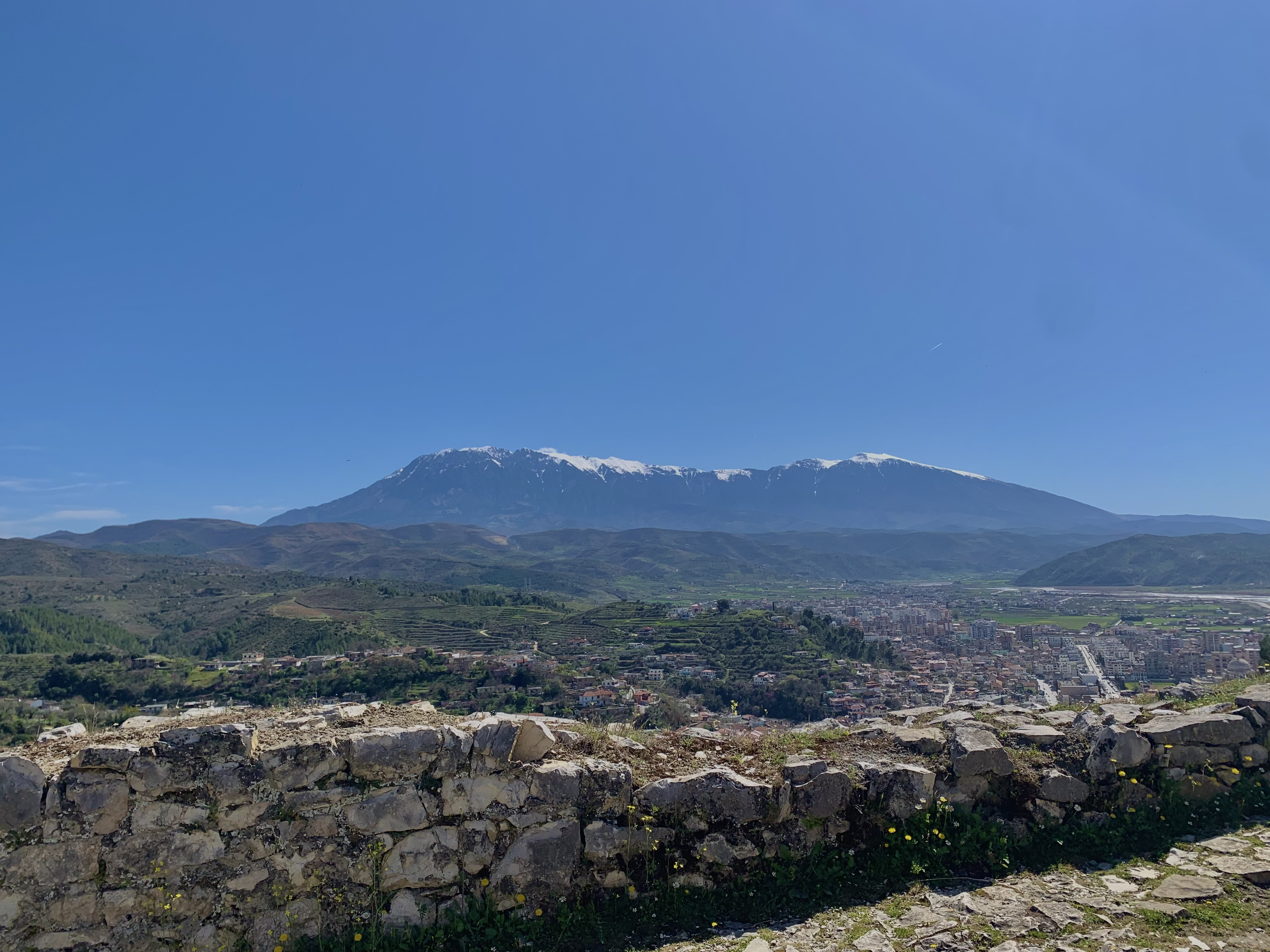
The cult practiced by the Albanians on Mount Tomorr in central Albania is considered as a continuation of the ancient sky-god worship.

After the first access of the ancestors of the Albanians to the Christian religion in antiquity, the presumable Albanian term for Sky-Father – Zot – has been used for the God in Christianity. In Albanian folk beliefs the peak of the highest mountains like Tomorr in central Albania has been associated with the sky-god Zojz. The enduring sanctity of the mountain, the annual pilgrimage to its summit, and the solemn sacrifice of a white bull by the local people, provide abundant evidence that the ancient cult of the sky-god on Mount Tomorr continues through the generations almost untouched by political events and religious changes.

=== In Slavic tradition ===
At one point, early Slavs, like some Iranian peoples after the Zoroastrian religious reformation, demonized the Slavic successor of *Dyēus. They abandoned this word in the sense of "heaven" at the same time, keeping the word for day. They abandoned many of the names of the other Proto-Indo-European gods, replacing them with new Slavic or Iranian names, while not replacing it with any other specific god, as a result of cultural contacts with Iranian peoples in the first millennium BC.

Hence, after the process of demonization by the Slavs, *Dyēus is considered to have originated two continuations: *divo ("strange, odd thing") and *divъ ("demon"). The result of this demonization may be Pan-Slavic demons, e.g. Polish and Czech dziwożona, or Div occurring in The Tale of Igor's Campaign.

According to some researchers, at least some of *Dyēus's traits could have been taken over by Svarog (Urbańczyk: Sun-Dažbóg – heavenly fire, Svarožič – earthly fire, Svarog – heaven, lightning). Helmold recalls that the Slavs were also supposed to believe in a god in heaven, who only deals with heavenly matters and commands other gods.

== In non-Indo-European traditions ==
Various loanwords of *deiwós were introduced in non-Indo-European languages, such as Estonian taevas or Finnish taivas ("sky"), borrowed from Proto-Indo-Iranian into these Uralic languages.

== Bibliography ==
- Anthony, David W. (2007). The Horse, the Wheel, and Language: How Bronze-Age Riders from the Eurasian Steppes Shaped the Modern World. Princeton University Press. ISBN 9781400831104.
- Beekes, Robert S. P. (2009). Etymological Dictionary of Greek. Brill. ISBN 978-90-04-32186-1.
- Curtis, Matthew C. (2017). "The phonology of Albanian". In Klein, Jared; Joseph, Brian; Fritz, Matthias (eds.). Handbook of Comparative and Historical Indo-European Linguistics. Vol. 3. Walter de Gruyter. ISBN 978-3110540369.
- Chelariu, Ana R. (2023). Romanian Folklore and its Archaic Heritage: A cultural and Linguistic Comparative Study. Springer Nature. ISBN 978-3-031-04051-1.
- Cook, Arthur Bernard (2010) [1940]. Zeus: Zeus, God of the Dark Sky (earthquakes, clouds, wind, dew, rain, meteorites). Zeus: A Study in Ancient Religion. Vol. 3 (Part 2). Cambridge University Press. ISBN 9781108021234.
- Delamarre, Xavier (2003). Dictionnaire de la langue gauloise: Une approche linguistique du vieux-celtique continental (in French). Errance. ISBN 9782877723695.
- Demiraj, Bardhyl (1997). Albanische Etymologien: Untersuchungen zum albanischen Erbwortschatz. Leiden Studies in Indo-European (in German). Vol. 7. Amsterdam, Atlanta: Rodopi.
- Demiraj, Bardhyl (2011). "Rrënjë dhe degë të krishterimit ndër shqiptarë" [Roots and branches of Christianity among Albanians] (PDF). Hylli i Dritës (in Albanian). 2. Shkodër: 58–78.
- Derksen, Rick (2008). Etymological Dictionary of the Slavic Inherited Lexicon. Brill. ISBN 9789004155046.
- Derksen, Rick (2015). Etymological Dictionary of the Baltic Inherited Lexicon. Brill. ISBN 978-90-04-27898-1.
- De Simone, Carlo (2017). "Messapic". In Klein, Jared; Joseph, Brian; Fritz, Matthias (eds.). Handbook of Comparative and Historical Indo-European Linguistics. Vol. 3. Walter de Gruyter. ISBN 978-3-11-054243-1.
- de Vaan, Michiel (2008). Etymological Dictionary of Latin and the other Italic Languages. Brill. ISBN 9789004167971.
- Dixon-Kennedy, Mike (1998). Encyclopedia of Russian & Slavic Myth and Legend. ABC-CLIO. ISBN 978-1-57607-063-5.
- Feizi, Abidin (1929). Grammatica della lingua albanese. Pubblicazione del R. Istituto orientale di Napoli. Napoli: Achille Cimmaruta.
- Gieysztor, Aleksander (2006). Mitologia Słowian (in Polish). Warsaw: Wydawnictwa Uniwersytetu Warszawskiego. ISBN 83-235-0234-X.
- Gołąb, Zbigniew (1992). The origins of the Slavs: a linguist's view. Slavica Publishers. ISBN 978-0-89357-224-2.
- Hackstein, Olav (2006). "La langue poétique indo-européenne: archaïsme et renouvellement dans les théonymes". In Pinault, Georges-Jean; Petit, Jean (eds.). La langue poétique indo-européenne: actes du colloque de travail de la Société des études indo-européennes. Peeters. pp. 95–108. ISBN 978-9042917811.
- Hyllested, Adam; Joseph, Brian D. (2022). "Albanian". In Olander, Thomas (ed.). The Indo-European Language Family : A Phylogenetic Perspective. Cambridge University Press. pp. 223–245. doi:10.1017/9781108758666. ISBN 9781108758666. S2CID 161016819.
- Jackson, Peter (2002). "Light from Distant Asterisks. Towards a Description of the Indo-European Religious Heritage". Numen. 49 (1): 61–102. doi:10.1163/15685270252772777. JSTOR 3270472.
- Jakobson, Roman (1962). Selected Writings: Slavic epic studies. Mouton. ISBN 9789027931788.
- Kim, Ronald I. (2017). "The Phonology of Balto-Slavic". In Klein, Jared; Joseph, Brian; Fritz, Matthias (eds.). Handbook of Comparative and Historical Indo-European Linguistics. Vol. 3. Walter de Gruyter. ISBN 978-3110540369.
- Kloekhorst, Alwin (2008). Etymological Dictionary of the Hittite Inherited Lexicon. Brill. ISBN 9789004160927.
- Kroonen, Guus (2013). Etymological Dictionary of Proto-Germanic. Brill. ISBN 9789004183407.
- Lecouteux, Claude (2016). Encyclopedia of Norse and Germanic Folklore, Mythology, and Magic. Simon & Schuster. ISBN 978-1-62055-481-4.
- Lehmann, Winfred P. (1986). A Gothic Etymological Dictionary. Brill. ISBN 978-90-04-08176-5.
- Mallory, James P.; Adams, Douglas Q. (1997). Encyclopedia of Indo-European Culture. London: Routledge. ISBN 978-1-884964-98-5.
- Mallory, James P.; Adams, Douglas Q. (2006). The Oxford Introduction to Proto-Indo-European and the Proto-Indo-European World. Oxford, England: Oxford University Press. ISBN 978-0-19-929668-2.
- Mann, Stuart E. (1948). An Historical Albanian-English Dictionary. Vol. II, N–Z. Longmans, Green and Co., LTD.
- Mann, Stuart E. (1952). "The Indo-European Consonants in Albanian". Language. 28 (1). Linguistic Society of America: 31–40. doi:10.2307/409988. JSTOR 409988.
- Mann, Stuart E (1977). An Albanian Historical Grammar. Hamburg: Helmut Buske Verlag. ISBN 9783871182624.
- Marold, Edith (1992). "Die Skaldendichtung als Quelle der Religionsgeschichte". Germanische Religionsgeschichte: Quellen und Quellenprobleme (in German). Walter de Gruyter. ISBN 978-3-11-012872-7.
- Martirosyan, Hrach K. (2010). Etymological Dictionary of Armenian. Brill. ISBN 978-90-04-17337-8.
- Matasović, Ranko (2009). Etymological Dictionary of Proto-Celtic. Brill. ISBN 9789004173361.
- Orel, Vladimir E. (1998). Albanian Etymological Dictionary. Brill. ISBN 978-90-04-11024-3.
- Ringe, Don (2006). From Proto-Indo-European to Proto-Germanic (PDF). A Linguistic History of English (1st ed.). New York City: Oxford University Press. ISBN 978-0-19-928413-9. OCLC 64554645. OL 7405151M. Wikidata Q131605459.
- Rudnyckyj, Jaroslav B. (1978). "Dyv Divть in Slovo o Рolkи Іhorevi". Studia Ucrainica. Vol. 1. University of Ottawa Press.
- Sakhno, Serguei (2017). "The dialectology of Slavic". In Klein, Jared; Joseph, Brian; Fritz, Matthias (eds.). Handbook of Comparative and Historical Indo-European Linguistics. Vol. 3. Walter de Gruyter. ISBN 978-3110540369.
- Simek, Rudolf (1996). Dictionary of Northern Mythology. D.S. Brewer. ISBN 978-0-85991-513-7.
- Szyjewski, Andrzej (2003). Religia Słowian (in Polish). Krakow: Wydawnictwo WAM. ISBN 83-7318-205-5.
- Treimer, Karl (1971). "Zur Rückerschliessung der illyrischen Götterwelt und ihre Bedeutung für die südslawische Philologie". In Henrik Barić (ed.). Arhiv za Arbanasku starinu, jezik i etnologiju. Vol. I. R. Trofenik. pp. 27–33.
- Watkins, Calvert (1995). How to Kill a Dragon: Aspects of Indo-European Poetics. Oxford University Press. ISBN 978-0198024712.
- West, Martin L. (2007). Indo-European Poetry and Myth. Oxford, England: Oxford University Press. ISBN 978-0-19-928075-9.
- Wodtko, Dagmar S.; Irslinger, Britta Sofie; Schneider, Carolin (2008). Nomina im Indogermanischen Lexikon (in German). Universitaetsverlag Winter. ISBN 978-3-8253-5359-9.
