= *H₁n̥gʷnis =

Fire-god in the Proto-Indo-European mythology

Equivalents
- Hindu: Agni
- Albanian: Enji
- Baltic: Ungnis

*H₁n̥gʷnis is the reconstructed Proto-Indo-European name of the fire god in Proto-Indo-European mythology.

== Name ==
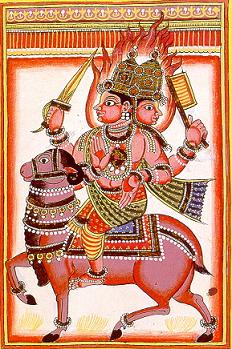
An 18th-century depiction of Agni, a descendant deity

The archaic Proto-Indo-European language (ca. 4500–4000 BC) had a two-gender system which originally divided words between animate and inanimate, a system used to distinguish a common term from its deified synonym. Therefore, fire as an animate entity and active force was known as *h₁n̥gʷnis, while the inanimate entity and natural substance was named *péh₂ur (cf. Greek: πυρ, pyr; English: fire).

In some traditions, as the sacral name of the dangerous fire may have become a word taboo, the stem *h₁n̥gʷnis served as an ordinary term for fire, as in the Latin ignis.

== Reconstruction ==
Although the linguistic evidence is restricted to the Vedic and Balto-Slavic traditions, scholars have proposed that Proto-Indo-Europeans conceived the fire as a divine entity called *h₁n̥gʷnis. "Seen from afar" and "untiring", the Indic deity Agni is pictured in the Rigveda as the god of both terrestrial and celestial fires. He embodied the flames of the sun and the lightning, as well as the forest fire, the domestic hearth fire and the sacrificial altar, linking heaven and earth in a ritual dimension. Another group of cognates deriving from the Balto-Slavic *ungnis ("fire") is also attested. Early modern sources report that Lithuanian priests worshipped a "holy Fire" named Ugnis (szwenta), which they tried to maintain in perpetual life, while Uguns (māte) was revered as the "Mother of Fire" by the Latvians. Tenth-century Persian sources give evidence of the veneration of fire among the Slavs, and later sources in Old Church Slavonic attest the worship of fire (ogonĭ), occurring under the divine name Svarožič, who has been interpreted as the son of Svarog.

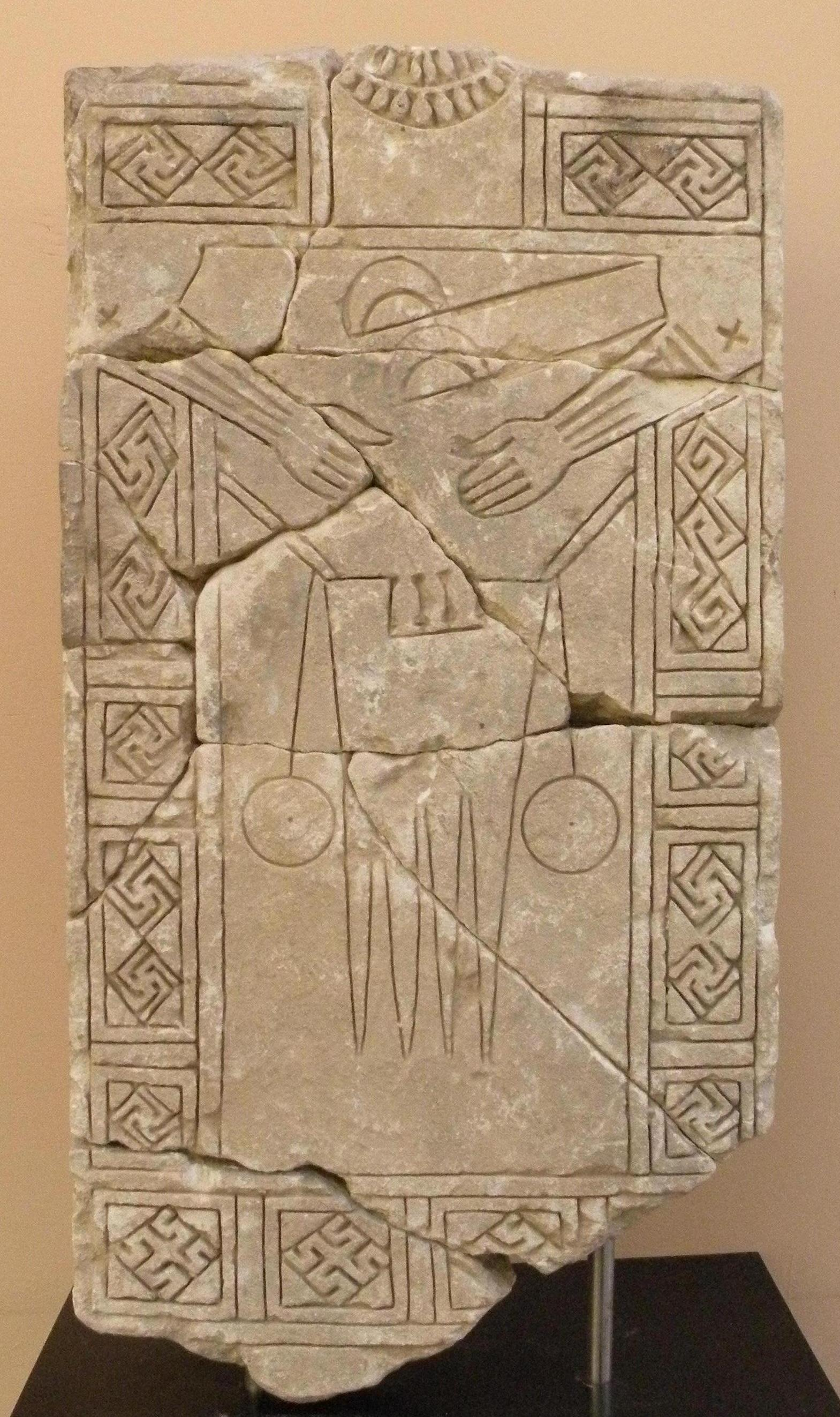
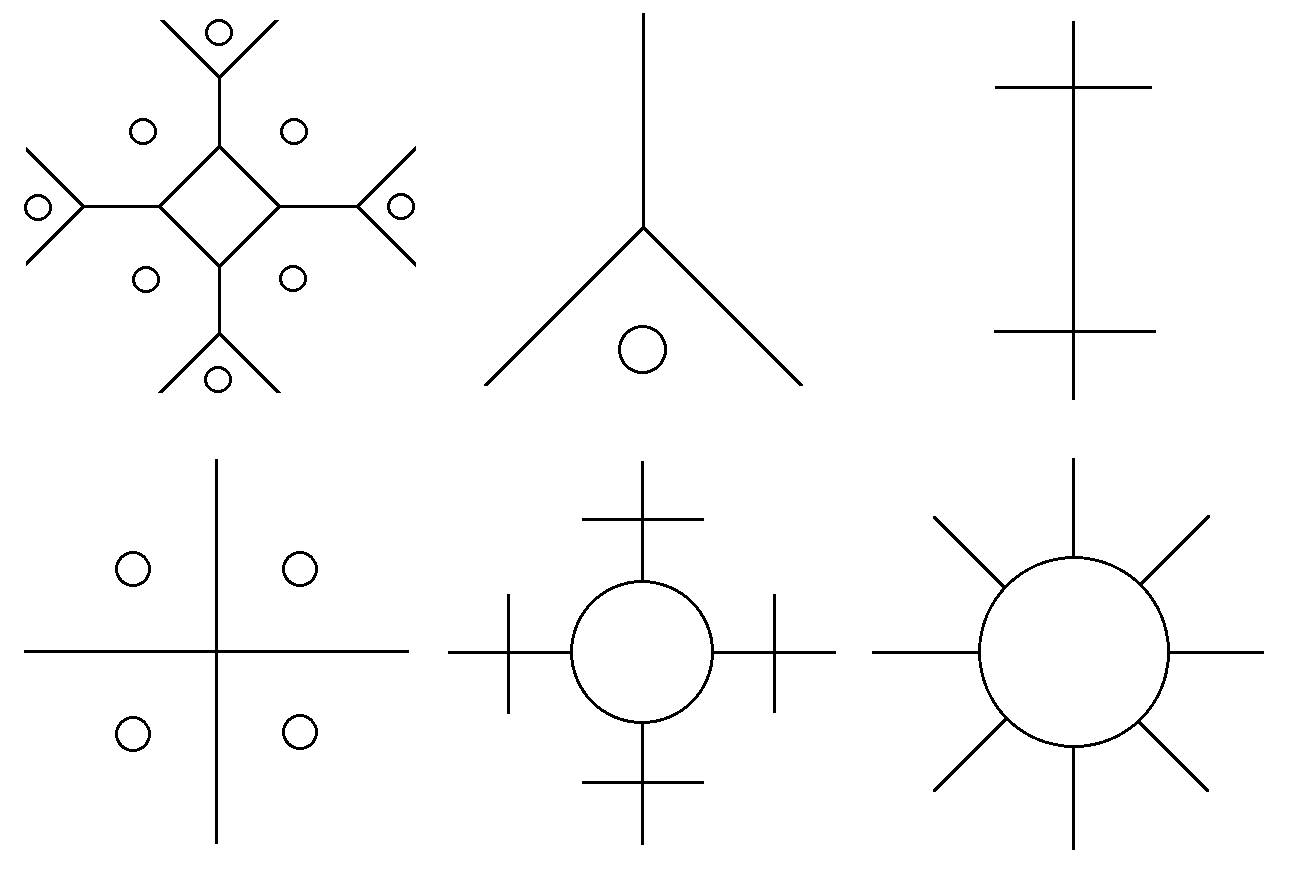
610-550 BC Daunian stelae from Apulia (left); Sun (Dielli) and Fire (Zjarri) symbols in Albanian traditional tattoo patterns (19th century). The cross (also swastika in some tattoos) is the Albanian traditional way to represent the deified Fire, evidently also called with the theonym Enji.

The name of the fire god in the Albanian pagan mythology – Enji, from PIE *h₁n̥gʷnis – is evidently contained in the week day name that was dedicated to him – e enjte – the Albanian word for Thursday. He is thought to have been worshiped by the Illyrians in antiquity, being the most prominent god of the pantheon when week day names were formed in the Albanian language. In Albanian tradition, the fire – zjarri – is deified, with the power to ward off evil and darkness, give strength to the Sun (Dielli, who is worshiped as the god of light and giver of life), sustain the continuity between life and afterlife and between the generations. The divine power of fire is used by Albanians for the hearth and the rituals, including calendar fires, sacrificial offerings, divination, purification, and protection from big storms and other potentially harmful events. The Albanian fire worship and rituals are associated with the cult of the Sun, the cult of the hearth (vatër) and the ancestor, and the cult of fertility in agriculture and animal husbandry.

Scholars generally agree that the cult of the hearth dates back to Proto-Indo-European times. The domestic fire had to be tended with care and given offerings, and if one moved house, one carried fire from the old to the new home. The Avestan Ātar was the sacral and hearth fire, often personified and honored as a god. In Albanian beliefs, Nëna e Vatrës ("the Hearth Mother") is the goddess protector of the domestic hearth (vatër). Herodotus reported a Scythian goddess of hearth named Tabiti, a term likely given under a slightly distorted guise, as she might represent a feminine participial form corresponding to an Indo-Iranian god named *Tapatī, "the Burning one". The sacral or domestic hearth can likewise be found in the Greek and Roman hearth goddesses Hestia and Vesta, two names that may derive from the PIE root *h₁w-es- ("burning"). Both the ritual fires set in the temples of Vesta and the domestic fires of ancient India were circular, rather than the square form reserved for public worship in India and for the other gods in Roman antiquity. Additionally, the custom that the bride circles the hearth three times is common to Indian, Ossetian, Slavic, Baltic, and German traditions, while a newly born child was welcomed into a Greek household when the father circled the hearth carrying it in the Amphidromia ceremony.

== Evidence ==
- PIE: *h₁n̥gʷnis, the fire as an active force,
  - Indo-Iranian: Hagni-,
    - Vedic: Agni (अग्नि), a fire deity,
    - Young Avestan: Dāšt-āɣni,
  - Balto-Slavic: *ungnis,
    - Lithuanian: Ugnis šventa, 'Holy Fire',
    - Latvian: Uguns māte, 'Mother of Fire',
  - Proto-Albanian: *agni-,
    - Albanian: Enji, fire deity, contained in the Albanian name for Thursday – e enjte.

== See also ==
- Ognyena Maria

== Bibliography ==
- Derksen, Rick (2008). Etymological Dictionary of the Slavic Inherited Lexicon. Brill. ISBN 9789004155046.
- Fortson, Benjamin W. (2004). Indo-European Language and Culture. Blackwell Publishing. ISBN 1-4051-0316-7.
- Jakobson, Roman (1985). "Linguistic Evidence in Comparative Mythology". In Stephen Rudy (ed.). Roman Jakobson: Selected Writings. Vol. VII: Contributions to Comparative Mythology: Studies in Linguistics and Philology, 1972–1982. Walter de Gruyter. ISBN 978-3-11-085546-3.
- Lubotsky, Alexander (2011), "Indo-Aryan Inherited Lexicon", Indo-European Etymological Dictionary Project, Brill
- Mallory, James P.; Adams, Douglas Q. (1997). Encyclopedia of Indo-European Culture. London: Routledge. ISBN 978-1-884964-98-5.
- Mallory, James P.; Adams, Douglas Q. (2006). The Oxford Introduction to Proto-Indo-European and the Proto-Indo-European World. Oxford, UK: Oxford University Press. ISBN 978-0-19-929668-2.
- Murray-Aynsley, J. C. (1891). "Swastika". Ars Quatuor Coronatorum. IV.
- Orel, Vladimir (1998). Albanian etymological dictionary. Brill. ISBN 978-90-04-11024-3.
- Tirta, Mark (2004). Petrit Bezhani (ed.). Mitologjia ndër shqiptarë (in Albanian). Tirana: Mësonjëtorja. ISBN 99927-938-9-9.
- Treimer, Karl (1971). "Zur Rückerschliessung der illyrischen Götterwelt und ihre Bedeutung für die südslawische Philologie". In Henrik Barić (ed.). Arhiv za Arbanasku starinu, jezik i etnologiju. Vol. I. R. Trofenik. pp. 27–33.
- West, Martin Litchfield (2007). Indo-European Poetry and Myth. Oxford, UK: Oxford University Press. ISBN 978-0-19-928075-9.

== See also ==
- The dictionary definition of *H₁n̥gʷnis at Wiktionary
