= Jai Radha Madhab =

Hindu song

Jai Radha Madhab, sometimes spelled as Jai Radha Madhava or Jai Radha Madhav, or Jay(a)- (due to Indo-Aryan schwa dropping) is a Hindu song in Vaishnava tradition. The title is derived from the first line of the song, “Jai Radha Madhava” (Literally means “Victory to Radha and Madhav”), and is commonly sung in Hindi or Sanskrit as Bhajan or in Kirtan. The official name for the song is Sri Krsnaer Vimsottara Sata Nama Song 4. The song is written by Bhaktivinoda Thakura in the book Gitavali. The word mādhava in Sanskrit is a name of Vishnu and Krishna, and is a vriddhi derivation of the word Madhu (Sanskrit: मधु) which means honey. It, therefore, functions as an adjective describing anything relating to honey or sweetness. This song was commonly sung by Srila Prabhupada before his Srimad Bhagavatam or Bhagavad-gita discourses.

Srila Prahbupad once said, in reference to this song,

“[This song is] a picture of Vrndavana. Everything is there--Srimati Radharani, Vrndavana, Govardhana, Yasoda, and all the cowherd boys.”

== Lyrics ==
Text in brackets is alternate transliteration. The standard transliteration used here is IAST. Below is English translation.

=== Verse 1 ===
==== jaya rādhā-mādhava (jaya) kuñja-bihārī ====
Victory to Radha-Madhava! Victory to Kunj Bihari!

(jai radha madhava jai kunja bihari (jay radha madhab jay kunj viharee))

==== (jaya) gopī-jana-vallabha (jaya) giri-vara-dhārī ====
Victory to Gopi Vallabha! Victory to Giri-vara-dhari!

(jai gopi jana vallabha jai girivaradhari (jay gopee jana vallabh jai girivaradhari))

=== Verse 2 ===
==== yaśodā-nandana braja-jana-rañjana ====
He is the beloved son of mother Yashoda, the delighter of the inhabitants of Vraja!

(yashoda nandana vraja jana ranjana (yashoda nandan vraj jana ranjan))

==== yamunā-tīra-vana-cārī ====
He wanders in the forests along the banks of the River Yamuna!

(yamuna tera vana chari (yamuna teera vana chari))
