= History of the Basque language =

Basque (/bæsk, bɑːsk/; euskara [eus̺ˈkaɾa]) is a pre-Indo-European language spoken in the Basque Country, extending over a strip along eastern areas of the Bay of Biscay in Spain and France, straddling the western Pyrenees. It is classified as a language isolate, having no demonstrable genetic relation to any other known language, with the sole exception of the extinct Aquitanian language, which is considered to be an ancestral form of Basque.

== Prehistory ==
Map of Basque's postulated geographic retreat since Roman times

The mainstream view of linguists today is that Basque is the last surviving member of one of the ancient "pre-Indo-European" language families that were once spoken widely in Western Europe. By the Roman period, the majority of the Western European population had become speakers of Indo-European languages; nevertheless, toponyms, personal names, and inscriptions attest to the presence of languages with Basque-like morphology and lexical roots around the Pyrenees at the time. Since the Early Middle Ages, Basque has receded geographically, and for the past 400 years it has been largely confined to the Basque Country. Basque has both influenced, and been influenced by, its geographically neighboring languages, exchanging both loanwords and structures.

== Early attestations ==
Basque remained until the late-20th century a language steeped in oral tradition and little used in writing. In 2022, an inscription dated to the first quarter of the first century BCE, known as the Hand of Irulegi, was found to contain a supposed Basque word, providing the earliest attestation of the language to date. A few Roman-period inscriptions in Latin also include Basque names.

It is generally thought that the first attestation of Basque in a manuscript is constituted by six words in the tenth- or eleventh-century Glosas Emilianenses. A more substantial early witness is a few words and phrases in Aymeric Picaud's account of his journey to Santiago de Compostela (around the year 1140).

The first book written in Basque, the Linguae Vasconum Primitiae, appeared in 1545. Yet Basque was never used for official documents, and came to be gradually excluded as an oral communication language from governing, educative, administrative bodies, and finally also from Church.

== Modern history ==
Basque venturers have taken their language overseas since the sixteenth century, especially into the Americas, where it came to be diluted in the larger, prevailing colonial languages, like Spanish, French, or English.

During the twentieth century, scholars, writers and activists endeavoured to develop a long-discussed aspiration to create a unified, formal standard, which finally crystallized in standard Basque (euskara batua) as of 1968.

== See also ==
- Origin of the Basques
