= Bardhyl Demiraj =

Albanian linguist (born 1958)

- Born: 29 March 1958 (age 68)
- Citizenship: Albanian
- Occupation: Linguist

Academic background
- Education: University of Tirana; University of Vienna; University of Bonn

Bardhyl Demiraj (born 29 March 1958) is an Albanian linguist and Albanologist. He is considered one of the leading experts in the study of Albanian etymology.

== Biography ==
Bardhyl Demiraj was born on 29 March 1958 in Tirana, the son of linguist Shaban Demiraj. He studied Albanian language and literature at the University of Tirana from 1977 to 1981, earning a master's degree in 1982. From 1984 to 1986, he specialized in Indo-European, Romanian and Balkan linguistics at the University of Vienna. From 1991 to 1993, he did postgraduate research at the University of Bonn, earning a doctorate in Tirana in 1994 after a dissertation on the historical development of the Albanian number system.

From 1994, he collaborated on the Indo-European Etymological Dictionary at the University of Leiden, while continuing his etymological research in Bonn. In 2001, he was appointed Professor of Albanian at the Institute for Comparative and Indo-European Linguistics of LMU Munich.

== Works ==
- Demiraj, Bardhyl (1997). Albanische Etymologien: Untersuchungen zum albanischen Erbwortschatz. Leiden Studies in Indo-European (in German). Vol. 7. Amsterdam, Atlanta: Rodopi. ISBN 9789042001619.
- Demiraj, Bardhyl (2011). "Rrënjë dhe degë të krishterimit ndër shqiptarë". Hylli i Dritës (2). Shkodër: 58–78.
- Demiraj, Bardhyl (2016). Gjak i shprishur: studime filologjike arbëreshe (in Albanian). Tiranë: Naimi. ISBN 9789928435354.
- Demiraj, Bardhyl; Starostin, Sergei; Lubotsky, Alexander; de Vaan, Michiel. "The Albanian inherited lexicon" (Database).
- Demiraj, Bardhyl; Hackstein, Olav. "DPEWA – Digitales Philologisch-Etymologisches Wörterbuch des Altalbanischen" (Database) (in German).
- "DY PIKAT MBI <ë>". Peizazhe të fjalës (in Albanian). May 27, 2023.
- "PASKAJORJA". Peizazhe të fjalës (in Albanian). June 9, 2023.
- Demiraj, Bardhyl, ed. (2024). The Albanian Language Area and its Surroundings from Late Antiquity to the High Middle Ages: Proceedings of the 7th German-Albanian Cultural Studies Conference (21.-22. April 2023, Hubmersberg/Pommelsbrunn). Albanische Forschungen. Vol. 50. Harrassowitz Verlag. ISBN 9783447121644.
