= Deipaturos =

Illyrian deity

Equivalents
- Indo-European: Dyēus

Deipaturos (Doric Greek: Δειπάτυρος, Deipáturos; lit. "sky-father") was a deity worshipped in ancient times as the Sky Father in the region of Tymphaea.

== Description ==
Deipáturos was recorded by the Greek grammarian Hesychius of Alexandria (fifth or sixth century AD), in an entry of his lexicon named "Deipáturos, a god among the Stymphians" (Δειπάτυρος θεὸς παρὰ Στυμφαίοις). Deipaturos was worshipped as the Sky Father (*Dyēus-Ph₂tḗr), a linguistic cognate of the Vedic Dyáuṣ Pitṛ́, Greek Zeus Patēr and Roman Jupiter.

Deipáturos is considered an Illyrian theonym.

According to Martin L. West, "the formal parallelism between the names of the Illyrian Deipaturos and the Messapic Damatura ["earth-mother"] may favour their having been a pair, but evidence of the liaison is lacking."

== See also ==
- Illyrian mythology

== Bibliography ==
- Filos, Panagiotis (2023). "Onomastic Formulae from N. Epirus and S. Illyria: Linguistic and Sociocultural Connotations". In Albio Cesare Cassio, Sara Kaczko (ed.). Alloglо̄ssoi: Multilingualism and Minority Languages in Ancient Europe. Trends in Classics – Greek and Latin Linguistics. Vol. 2. Walter de Gruyter GmbH & Co KG. pp. 83–113. ISBN 9783110779684.
- Fortson, Benjamin W. (2009). Indo-European Language and Culture: an Introduction. John Wiley & Sons. ISBN 978-1405188968.
- Mallory, James P.; Adams, Douglas Q. (2006), The Oxford Introduction to Proto-Indo-European and the Proto-Indo-European World, Oxford, England: Oxford University Press, ISBN 978-0-19-929668-2
- West, Morris L. (2007). Indo-European Poetry and Myth. Oxford University Press. ISBN 978-0199280759.
