= Urtzi =

Basque word

Urtzi (also ortzi) is an ancient Basque language term which is believed to either represent an old common noun for the sky, or to have been a name for a pre-Christian sky deity.

== Controversy ==
The existence of a Basque mythological figure, Urtzi, has been questioned in numerous discussions. The argument for Urtzi having been a "Basque sky god" is based on two main arguments:

The first argument is that Basque has numerous calendric and meteorological terms which contain forms of the root ortzi (with the variants urtz, ortz, orz and ost), for example:

- ortzadar 'rainbow' (ortzi + adar 'horn')
- ortzi 'sky, thunder'
- orzgorri (> oskorri) 'red sky' (ortzi + gorri 'red')
- ostargi 'daylight' (ortzi + argi 'light')
- ostegun 'Thursday' (ortzi + egun 'day')
- oskarbi 'clear sky' (ortzi + garbi 'clean')

This has led to a popular modern interpretation of Urtzi as a sky god. The modern Basque word for sky, zeru, is a cognate of (probably a loanword from) the Latin 'caelum. The word urtzi or ortzi is not productive in the modern Basque language.

The second argument is based on the 12th-century account, the Codex Calixtinus, of Aymeric Picaud, a French pilgrim, who recorded a number of Basque words and expressions. He wrote about Urtzi: et Deus uocant Urcia ("and they name God as Urcia".) Since the remaining material Picaud recorded appears to be very accurate, this bears some weight.

However, there are no legends at all related to such a god and Picaud remains the only explicit reference to date. This had led to the alternative theory that this may have been a generic term for 'sky' and that Picaud may have simply "pointed at the sky" looking for the word for God and been supplied the word for 'sky.' This explanation is to some degree supported by the unexpected absolutive case ending -a in Urcia, which neither in Proto-Basque or modern Basque appears on proper nouns. To date neither theory has been able to convince fully.

== As a personal name ==
With the modern resurgent interest in Basque names, Urtzi has been used as a male given name:

- Urtzi Urrutikoetxea, Basque writer
- Urtzi Iriondo, footballer
