= Archive-Library of the Cathedral of Santiago de Compostela =

Library and archive in Galicia, Spain

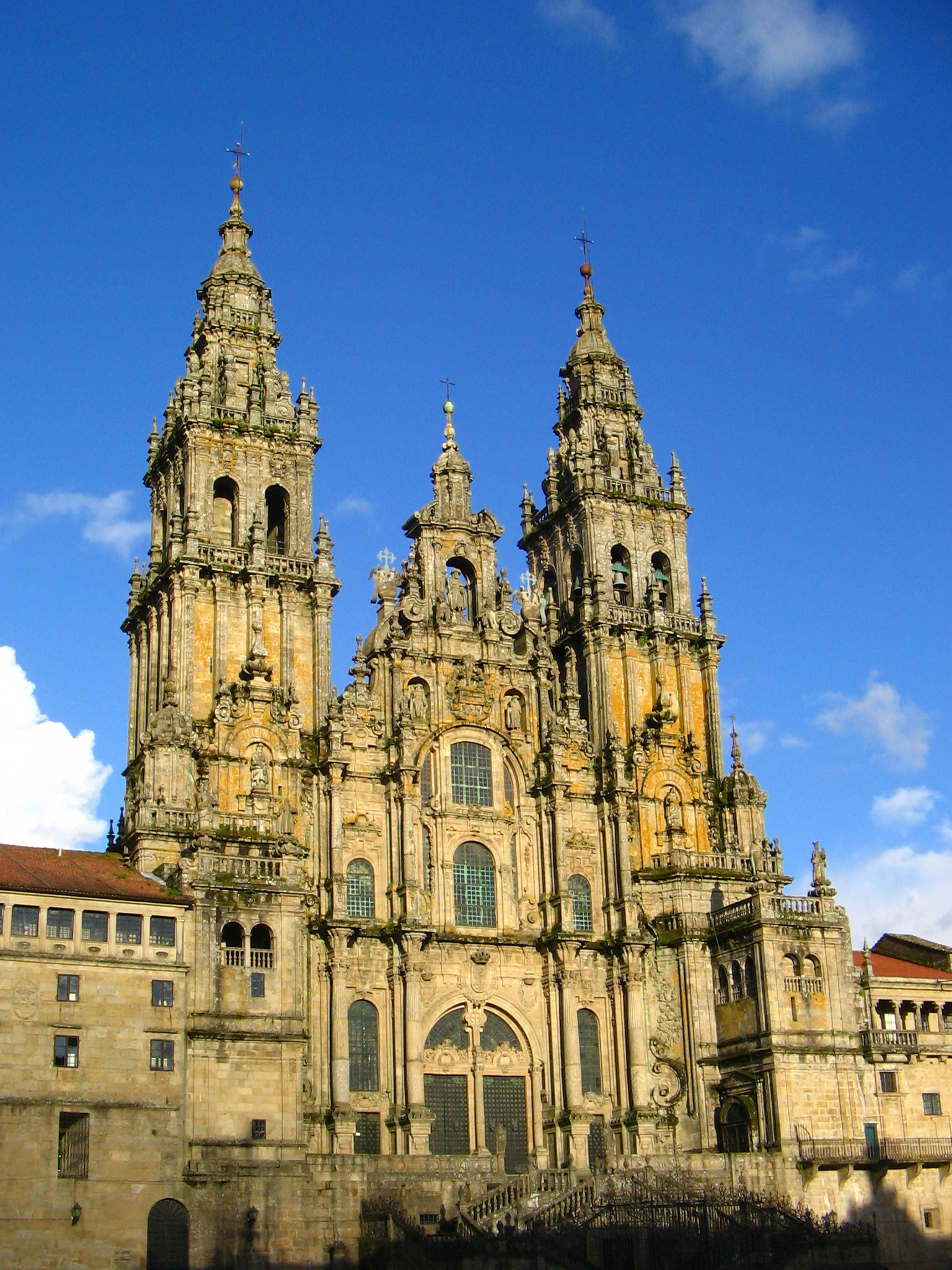
- Cathédrale de Saint Jacques de Compostelles
- 42.881051183923326°N 8.543519739432933°W
- Location: Santiago de Compostela, Galicia, Spain
- Type: Religious

Other information
- Affiliation: Cathedral of Santiago de Compostela
- Website: catedraldesantiago.es

The Archive-Library of the Cathedral of Santiago de Compostela is the institution that preserves the documentary and bibliographic heritage of the Chapter and Cathedral of Santiago de Compostela, comprising books and documents from the Middle Ages until today; one of the main centers of the world for research on St. James.

The Archive-Library, which offers reference and documentation services, is currently located in the cloister of the Cathedral.

== History of the Archive and medieval documentation ==
The origin of the Archive of the Cathedral of Santiago de Compostela is located in the medieval treasury and in the archival and documental organizations that were developed by archbishops Diego Gelmírez, during the first half of the 12th century, and Berenguel de Landoira, in the first half of the 14th. Since the moment of the inventio, or discovery of the apostolic building, in the 9th century, the enormous political and socioeconomic development of the new ecclesiastical institution that looked after the place made necessary the conservation, in order to justify its rights, of all kinds of documentation: royal, pontifical, ecclesiastic and civilian; a documentation integrated, together with existing books and codices, in the Treasury.

As time passed, there was conformed a documentary mass integrated by documentation in cartularies, single documents, and later documents of the modern and contemporary period. The first bishop and archbishop of the see, Diego Gelmírez, towards the first third of the 12th century, was the first one who developed an archival order minimally of the set, with a selection of documentation, an organization and the copy in new supports, giving place to codex such as the Tumbo A (12th-13th centuries) in his earlier phase, cartulary with the royal documentation of the 9th-13th centuries and with a miniature gallery of kings, queens and princesses of Castile-Leon. In this century is also produced the Codex Calixtinus, the medieval Jacobean history strongpoint.

Two centuries later the archbishop Berenguel of Landoira, after an urban revolt in Santiago, developed a second work of rearrangement, upon the same base of selection, ordainment, documentation organization and copy to new supports. Thus, were produced the Tumbo B and C, with royal documentation, pontifical, ecclesiastic and civilian.

== Bibliography ==
- Balasch, María T. (2004). Tumbo B de la Catedral de Santiago, Santiago de Compostela (in Spanish). Cabildo de la S.A.M.I. Catedral. ISBN 978-8484851707.
- Iglesias Ortega, Arturo; Seijas Montero, María; Sandoval Verea, Francisco (2007). Guía del Archivo de la Catedral de Santiago (in Spanish). Santiago de Compostela.
- Leirós Fernández, Eladio (1970). Los tres Libros de Aniversarios de la Catedral compostelana. Compostellanum (in Spanish). Vol. XV. ISSN 0573-2018.
- López Alsina, Fernando (1988). Barreiro Fernández, X. R. (ed.). O Arquivo Catedralicio de Santiago. Inventario das fontes documentais da Galicia medieval (in Spanish). Santiago de Compostela. OCLC 1024912149.
- Lucas Álvarez, Manuel (1998). Tumbo A de la Catedral de Santiago (in Spanish). A Coruña. ISBN 978-8474928709.
- Novás Pérez, M.ª Elena (2009). Catalogo de la Colección Guerra Campos del Archivo-Biblioteca de la Catedral de Santiago (in Spanish). Santiago de Compostela. OCLC 733847246.
- Sánchez Sánchez, Xosé M. (2006). "Recuento de las fuentes medievales del Archivo de la Catedral de Santiago de Compostela". Compostellanum: Revista de la Archidiócesis de Santiago de Compostela. Compostellanum (in Spanish). LI (3–4). Santiago de Compostela: 313–323.
- Sánchez Sánchez, Xosé M. (2006). La Iglesia de Santiago y el Pontificado en la Edad Media (1140–1414) (Thesis). Bulario medieval de la Catedral de Santiago (in Spanish). Santiago de Compostela.
- Sánchez Sánchez, Xosé M. (2009). A Colección López Ferreiro do Arquivo-Biblioteca da Catedral de Santiago de Compostela (in Spanish). Santiago de Compostela. ISBN 978-8496530805.
- Sánchez Sánchez, Xosé M. (2009). Catálogo de Manuscritos do Arquivo-Biblioteca da Catedral de Santiago de Compostela (in Spanish). Santiago de Compostela. ISBN 978-8496530799.
- Souto Cabo, José António; Vasques, Rui (2001). Crónica de Santa María de Íria (in Spanish). Santiago de Compostela.
