= Alexander Lubotsky =

Russian-Dutch linguist

- Александр Маркович Лубоцкий
- Born: 16 April 1956 (age 70); Moscow, Russian SFSR

Academic background
- Education: Moscow State University; Leiden University

Alexander Markovich "Sasha" Lubotsky (Russian: Александр Маркович Лубоцкий; born 16 April 1956), is a Russian-Dutch linguist and Indologist who specializes in the study of Indo-Iranian languages. He is the editor-in-chief of the Leiden Indo-European Etymological Dictionary project.

In 2011, he published The Indo-Aryan Inherited Lexicon, a list of inherited Old Indo-Aryan words along with their Proto-Indo-Iranian ancestor forms.

== Biography ==
Alexander Lubotsky was born in Moscow, Russian SFSR. His father was the violinist Mark Lubotsky. He studied linguistics at Lomonosov University (now Moscow State University) between 1973 and 1976, then Indo-Iranian languages at Leiden University from 1976 to 1980. He earned a BA in Indo-Iranian in 1978, a MA in Comparative Indo-European Linguistics in 1980, then a PhD in Linguistics from Leiden in 1987, following a thesis on the Nominal accentuation in Sanskrit and Indo-European under the supervision of Robert S. P. Beekes. The thesis was published in 1988 under the title The System of Nominal Accentuation in Sanskrit and Proto-Indo-European.

Since 1999, he has been a full professor of Comparative Indo-European Linguistics at Leiden University. Since 1992, he has been the editor-in-chief of the Leiden Studies in Indo-European series, the director of the Leiden Summer School in Languages and Linguistics since 2006, and a member of the editorial board of Brill's studies in Indo-European Languages & Linguistics since 2008.

Lubotsky is a member of the Royal Netherlands Academy of Arts and Sciences since 2003. He has supervised the PhD dissertations of Michiel de Vaan (2002), Sergei Starostin (honorary degree, 2005), and Guus Kroonen (2009).
