= Indo-European Etymological Dictionary =

Research project in Leiden University, Netherlands

The Indo-European Etymological Dictionary (commonly abbreviated IEED) is a research project of the Department of Comparative Indo-European Linguistics at Leiden University, initiated in 1991 by Peter Schrijver and others. It is financially supported by the Faculty of Humanities and Centre for Linguistics of Leiden University, Brill Publishers, and the Netherlands Organisation for Scientific Research.

== Overview ==
The IEED project is supervised by Alexander Lubotsky. It aims to accomplish the following goals:

- to compile etymological databases for the individual branches of Indo-European, containing all the words that can be traced back to Proto-Indo-European, and print them in Brill's Leiden Indo-European Etymological Dictionary series,
- to publish those databases free of charge electronically on the Internet, by utilizing Sergei Starostin's STARLING software technology,
- finally, once the etymological dictionaries of the individual branches have been compiled, to create a new large Indo-European etymological dictionary that will serve as a replacement of Julius Pokorny's outdated but still valuable Indogermanisches etymologisches Wörterbuch.

== Contributors by branch ==
- Albanian: Bardhyl Demiraj, Michiel de Vaan
- Anatolian: Alwin Kloekhorst
- Armenian: Hrach Martirosyan
- Baltic: Rick Derksen
- Celtic: Ranko Matasović
- Germanic: Guus Kroonen
  - Old Frisian: Dirk Boutkan, Sjoerd Siebinga
- Greek: Robert Beekes
- Indo-Iranian:
  - Indo-Aryan: Alexander Lubotsky
  - Iranian: Garnik Asatrian
    - Iranian verbs: Johnny Cheung
- Italic: Michiel de Vaan
- Slavic: Rick Derksen
- Tocharian: Michaël Peyrot

== Printed works ==
The project has so far resulted in the following printed works:

- Boutkan, Dirk; Siebinga, Sjoerd Michiel (2005). Old Frisian Etymological Dictionary. Brill Academic Publishers. ISBN 978-90-04-14531-3.
- Cheung, Johnny (2007). Etymological Dictionary of the Iranian Verb. Brill Academic Publishers. ISBN 978-90-04-15496-4.
- Kuz'mina, Elena E. (2007). Mallory, J. P. (ed.). The Origin of the Indo-Iranians. Brill Academic Publishers. ISBN 978-90-04-16054-5.
- Derksen, Rick (2007). Etymological Dictionary of the Slavic Inherited Lexicon. Brill Academic Publishers. ISBN 978-90-04-15504-6.
- Kloekhorst, Alwin (2008). Etymological Dictionary of the Hittite Inherited Lexicon. Brill Academic Publishers. ISBN 978-90-04-16092-7.
- Bomhard, Allan R. (2008). Reconstructing Proto-Nostratic. Brill Academic Publishers. ISBN 978-90-04-16853-4.
- de Vaan, Michiel (2008). Etymological Dictionary of Latin (and the other Italic Languages). Brill Academic Publishers. ISBN 978-90-04-16797-1.
- Martirosyan, Hrach K. (2009). Etymological Dictionary of the Armenian Inherited Lexicon. Brill Academic Publishers. ISBN 978-90-04-17337-8.
- Matasović, Ranko (2009). Etymological Dictionary of Proto-Celtic. Brill Academic Publishers. ISBN 978-90-04-17336-1.
- Beekes, Robert S. P. (2009). Etymological Dictionary of Greek. Brill Academic Publishers. ISBN 978-90-04-17418-4.
- Kroonen, Guus (2013). Etymological Dictionary of Proto-Germanic. Brill Academic Publishers. ISBN 978-90-04-18340-7.
- Derksen, Rick (2014). Etymological Dictionary of the Baltic Inherited Lexicon. Brill Academic Publishers. ISBN 978-90-04-27898-1.

== See also ==
- Indo-European studies
- Lexikon der indogermanischen Verben (LIV, published 1998 and 2001 by Helmut Rix and others)
- Proto-Indo-European language
