= Aymeric Picaud =

12th-century French scholar, monk and pilgrim

Aymeric Picaud was a 12th-century French scholar, monk and pilgrim from Parthenay-le-Vieux in Poitou. He is most widely known today as being the suspected author of the Codex Calixtinus, an illuminated manuscript giving background information for pilgrims travelling the Way of St. James. In essence, he wrote one of the earliest known tourist guidebooks.

== Aymeric's Basque material ==
Among Basque scholars, Aymeric's account of his journey to Santiago de Compostela (around the year 1140) is considered as highly important for the history of the Basque language because it contains some of the earliest Basque words and phrases.

The words and phrases he recorded are:

- andrea 'lady (of the house)' (modern andrea)
- Andrea Maria, glossed as 'mother of God'
- aragui 'meat' (modern haragi)
- araign 'fish' (modern arrain)
- ardum 'wine', assumed to represent nasalised [ardũ] (modern ardo, ardũ in the Souletin dialect, from older ardano)
- aucona 'dart' (modern azkona)
- belaterra 'the priest' (modern beretterra 'sacristan')
- echea 'the house' (modern etxea)
- elicera 'to church' (modern elizara, elizera in some dialects)
- ereguia 'the king' (modern erregea, erregia in some dialects)
- gari 'wheat' (modern gari)
- iaona 'the master' (modern jauna)
- Iaona domne Iacue 'St James' (modern Jauna Done Iakue)
- ogui 'bread' (modern ogi)
- Urcia, glossed as 'God' by Picaud (see Urtzi)
- uric 'any water' (modern urik)
