= Vṛddhi =

Strongest grade of vowel gradation

Vṛddhi (also rendered vr̥ddhi) is a technical term in morphophonology given to the strongest grade in the vowel gradation system of Sanskrit and of Proto-Indo-European. The term is derived from Sanskrit वृद्धि vṛddhi (IPA: [ˈʋr̩d̪̚.d̪ʱi], lit. 'growth' (Note: in Sanskrit, a -tí-nomen actionis formed from the verbal root vṛdh-/vardh- 'to grow')), from Proto-Indo-European *werdʰ- 'to grow'. (Note: *werdʰ- 'to grow' entry at Indo-European etymological database of The Tower of Babel project.)

== Origins ==
Vṛddhi itself has its origins in proto-vṛddhi, a process in the early stage of the Proto-Indo-European language originally for forming possessive derivatives of ablauting noun stems, with the meaning "of, belonging to, descended from". To form a vṛddhi-derivative, one takes the zero-grade of the ablauting stem (i.e. removes the vowel), inserts the vowel *e in a position which does not necessarily match that of the original vowel, and appends an accented thematic vowel (or accents any existing final thematic vowel). For example:

PIE *dyew- "sky" (cf. Latin diēs, Sanskrit dyú "day"; Hittite šīu- "god") → zero grade *diw- → proto-vṛddhi derivative *deyw-ó-s "god, sky god", lit. "skyling" (cf. Sanskrit devá, Latin deus, etc.)

However, in a later stage of the language this appears to have extended to non-ablauting noun stems that already contained *e, which would contract with the inserted vowel to form a lengthened *ē:

PIE *swéḱur-o- "father-in-law" (cf. Latin socer, Sanskrit śváśura) → proto-vṛddhi derivative *swēḱur-ó-s "brother-in-law", lit. "male descendent of one's father in law" (cf. Sanskrit śvāśurá, Old High German swāgur "brother-in-law")

The above example also displays the stressing of the thematic vowel when it already exists. It is this later version of proto-vṛddhi which is displayed in Sanskrit's lengthened vṛddhi grade.

== Vṛddhi in Sanskrit ==
The general phenomenon of vowel gradation, including vṛddhi formation, has been extensively studied and documented as part of Sanskrit's vigorous grammatical tradition, most importantly in the Aṣṭādhyāyī of the grammarian Pāṇini.

For example:

- bhṛ-tá- "carried" (zero grade)
- bhár-aṇa- "burden" (first grade, full grade, or guṇa)
- bhār-yá- "to be carried" (second grade, lengthened grade, or vṛddhi)

The full pattern of vowel gradation can be observed as follows:

Vowel gradation
	Zero grade	← 1st grade →	2nd grade
Open	∅	a	ā
Palatal	i/ī y i/ī	e (Note: originally 'ai') ay ya	ai (Note: originally 'āi') āy yā
Labial	u/ū v u/ū	o (Note: originally 'au') av va	au (Note: originally 'āu') āv vā
Retroflex	ṛ r ṛ	ar ar ra	ār ār rā
Dental	ḷ	al	āl

== Vṛddhi in Indo-European ==
In modern Indo-European linguistics it is used in Pāṇini's sense and applied to the Indo-European languages in general. The feature is considered to have been inherited from the Proto-Indo-European language.

- *bʰr̥- (Note: The asterisk * indicates that a form is not directly attested, but has been reconstructed on the basis of other linguistic material.) (zero grade of the reconstructed verb meaning "to carry")
- *bʰer- (full grade)
- *bʰēr- (vṛddhi, lengthened grade)

== Sources ==
- Bucknell, Roderick S (2000). Sanskrit Manual. ISBN 81-208-1188-7.
- Burrow, T (2001). The Sanskrit Language (2001 ed.). Motilal Banarsidass. ISBN 81-208-1767-2.
- Clackson, James (2007). Indo-European Linguistics: An Introduction. Cambridge University Press. ISBN 978-0-511-36609-3. OCLC 123113761.
- Fortson IV, Benjamin W. (2010). Indo-European Language and Culture: An Introduction (2nd ed.). Chichester, United Kingdom: Wiley-Blackwell. ISBN 978-1-4051-8895-1. OCLC 276406248.
- Meier-Brügger, Michael; Fritz, Matthias; Mayrhofer, Manfred (2003). Indo-European Linguistics. Berlin: Walter de Gruyter. ISBN 3-11-017433-2.
- Ringe, Don (2017). From Proto-Indo-European to Proto-Germanic. A Linguistic History of English (2nd ed.). Oxford: Oxford University Press. doi:10.1093/oso/9780198792581.001.0001. ISBN 978-0-19-879258-1. OCLC 972772031. OL 27415350M. Wikidata Q119269648.
- Rix, H (2001). Lexikon der indogermanischen Verben (2 ed.). L. Reichert. ISBN 3-89500-219-4.
