= Rick Derksen =

Dutch linguist

Rick Derksen (born 1964) is a Dutch linguist and Indo-Europeanist at the University of Leiden who specializes in Balto-Slavic historical linguistics with an emphasis on accentology and etymology.

Derksen is a contributor to Leiden-based Indo-European Etymological Dictionary project, for which he wrote the Etymological Dictionary of the Slavic Inherited Lexicon (Brill, 2008) and the Etymological Dictionary of the Baltic Inherited Lexicon (Brill, 2015).

== Derksen's law ==
=== Overview ===
According to the law, the forms with the suffixes *-to-, *-sto-, *-tlo- had the Balto-Slavic final accent. In the Proto-Lithuanian language, the accent was retracted from short vowels to the previous syllable, as a result of which the accent appeared on the syllable with an unstressed acute transformed into circumflex.

=== Examples ===
- Proto-Indo-European *bʰuHtlóm → Proto-Balto-Slavic *būˀtlá → Proto-Lithuanian *būtlás → (Derksen's law) Lithuanian bū̃klas; nom.sg, сf. Proto-Slavic *bydlò.

== Significant works ==
- Derksen, Rick (2008). Etymological Dictionary of the Slavic Inherited Lexicon. Leiden Indo-European Etymological Dictionary Series. Vol. 4. Brill.
- Derksen, Rick (2015). Etymological Dictionary of the Baltic Inherited Lexicon. Leiden Indo-European Etymological Dictionary Series. Vol. 13. Leiden, Boston: Brill. ISBN 978 90 04 27898 1.
