= Robert S. P. Beekes =

Dutch linguist (1937–2017)

- Born: Robert Stephen Paul Beekes; 2 September 1937; Haarlem, Netherlands
- Died: 21 September 2017 (aged 80); Oegstgeest, Netherlands
- Education: Leiden University (Ph.D., 1969)
- Known for: Contributions to Indo-European studies Reconstructing Pre-Greek phonology Indo-European Etymological Dictionary; Etymological Dictionary of Greek
- Scientific career
- Fields: Indo-European linguistics
- Workplaces: Leiden University
- Doctoral advisor: F. B. J. Kuiper

Robert Stephen Paul Beekes (Dutch: [ˈbeːkəs]; 2 September 1937 – 21 September 2017) was a Dutch linguist who was emeritus professor of Comparative Indo-European Linguistics at Leiden University and an author of many monographs on the Proto-Indo-European language.

== Scholarly work ==
One of his most well-known books is Comparative Indo-European Linguistics: An Introduction, a standard handbook on Proto-Indo-European that treats the area of linguistic reconstruction thoroughly but also features cultural reconstruction and comparative linguistic methods in general.

Beekes was also a co-author, with L. Bouke van der Meer, of De Etrusken spreken (1991). He advocated the Asia Minor theory to explain the Etruscans' origin. In 1993, he was elected member of the Royal Netherlands Academy of Arts and Sciences.

He also did work on Pre-Greek, the (non-Indo-European) language that was spoken in Greece before Greek, possibly around 2000 BC. Since this language was not written, Beekes obtained his information from many words in Classical Greek that show a non-Greek structure and development. Beekes authored the Etymological Dictionary of Greek for the Leiden Indo-European Etymological Dictionary series. His work drew praise, with the philologist Oliver Simkin stating, "Brill's claim that it 'should be on every classicist's desk' is fully justified." Simkin does, however, criticize Beekes for his proclivity towards Pre-Greek etymologies, many of which are described by Simkin as "contentious." Another linguist, Miles Beckwith, commended the work for supposedly containing "a wealth of information on the historical development of Greek," though he still considered the predilection for Pre-Greek etymologies to be a "pervasive issue."

== Selected works ==
=== Monographs ===
- The Development of the Proto-Indo-European Laryngeals in Greek. The Hague–Paris: Mouton, 1969.
- The Origins of the Indo-European Nominal Inflection. Innsbruck: IBS, 1985.
- A Grammar of Gatha-Avestan. Leiden: Brill, 1988.
- Vergelijkende taalwetenschap. Een inleiding in de vergelijkende Indo-europese taalwetenschap. Amsterdam: Het Spectrum, 1990.
  - English translation: Comparative Indo-European Linguistics: An Introduction, trans. UvA Vertalers & Paul Gabriner. Amsterdam: Benjamins, 1995; second edition revised and corrected by Michiel de Vaan, 2011.
- with L. Bouke van der Meer, De Etrusken spreken. Muiderberg: Coutinho, 1991.
- The Origin of the Etruscans. Amsterdam: Koninklijke Nederlandse Akademie van Wetenschappen, 2003.
- Etymological Dictionary of Greek, 2 vols. Leiden: Brill, 2009.
- Pre-Greek: Phonology, Morphology, Lexicon, Leiden: Brill, 2014. (Edited by Stefan Norbruis. Translated in Greek.)

=== Edited volumes ===
- Rekonstruktion und relative Chronologie. Akten der VIII. Fachtagung der Indogermanischen Gesellschaft, Leiden, 31. August – 4. September 1987, ed. Robert S. P. Beekes, A. Lubotsky, J. Weitenberg. Innsbruck: Institut für Sprachwissenschaft, 1992. ISBN 3851246136.

=== Articles ===
- "Mṓnukhes híppoi", Orbis 20 (1971): 138–142.
- "H_{2}O", Die Sprache 18 (1972): 11–31.
- "The nominative of the hysterodynamic noun-inflection", Zeitschrift für vergleichende Sprachforschung 86 (1972): 30–63.
- "The proterodynamic perfect", Zeitschrift für vergleichende Sprachforschung 87 (1973): 86–98.
- "Two notes on PIE stems in dentals", Historische Grammatik des Griechischen: Laut- und Formenlehre, ed. Helmut Rix. Darmstadt: 1975, pp. 9–14.
- "Intervocalic laryngeal in Gatha-Avestan", Bono Homini Donum: Essays in Historical Linguistics, in Memory of J. Alexander Kerns, eds. Yoël L. Arbeitman & Allan R. Bomhard. Amsterdam: John Benjamins, 1981, pp. 47–64.
- "The disyllabic reduplication of the Sanskrit intensives", Münchener Studien zur Sprachwissenschaft 40 (1981): 19–25.
- "The subjunctive endings of Indo-Iranian", Indo-Iranian Journal 23 (1981): 21–27
- "GAv. må, the PIE word for 'moon, month', and the perfect participle", Journal of Indo-European Studies 10 (1982): 53–64.
- "On laryngeals and pronouns", Zeitschrift für vergleichende Sprachforschung 96 (1983): 200–232.
- "PIE 'sun'", Münchener Studien zur Sprachwissenschaft 43 (1984): 5–8.
- "On Indo-European 'wine'", Münchener Studien zur Sprachwissenschaft 80 (1987): 21–6.
- "The origin of the PIE pronominal inflection", A Festschrift in honour of E. C. Polomé, eds. M. A. Jazayery & W. Winter. NY: de Gruyter, 1987, pp. 73–88.
- "The word for 'four' in PIE", Journal of Indo-European Studies 15 (1987): 215–19.
- "Laryngeal developments: A survey", Die Laryngaltheorie und die Rekonstruktion des indogermanischen Laut- und Formensystems, ed. Alfred Bammesberger. Heidelberg: Carl Winter, 1988, pp. 59–105.
- "PIE RHC – in Greek and other languages", Indogermanische Forschungen 93 (1988): 22–45.
- "The genitive singular of the pronoun in Germanic and Indo-European", Beiträge zur Geschichte der deutschen Sprache und Literatur 110 (1988): 1–5.
- "The nature of the PIE laryngeals", The New Sound of Indo-European: Essays in Phonological Reconstruction, ed. Theo Vennemann. Berlin/NY: de Gruyter, 1989, pp. 23–33.
- "Bloem en blad", 100 jaar etymologisch woordenboek van het Nederlands, eds. A. Moerdijk et al. The Hague: 1990, pp. 375–382.
- "De verwantschap van het Etruskisch", Lampas 23 (1990): 5–18.
- "The genitive in *-osio", Folia linguistica historica 11 (1990): 21–6.
- "The historical grammar of Greek", Linguistic Change and Reconstruction Methodology, ed. P. Baldi. Berlin–NY: de Gruyter, 1990, pp. 305–329.
- "Wackernagel's explanation of the lengthened grade", Sprachwissenschaft und Philologie, eds. H. Eichner & Helmut Rix. Wiesbaden: 1990, pp. 33–53
- "Who were the laryngeals?", In honorem Holger Pedersen: Kolloquium der indogermanischen Gesellschaft vom 25. bis 28. März 1993 in Kopenhagen, ed. J. Rasmussen. Wiesbaden: Ludwig Reichert Verlag 1994, pp. 449–454.
- "Hades and Elysion", Mír Curad. Studies in honor of Calvert Watkins, ed. Jay Jasanoff. Innsbruck: 1998, pp. 17–28.
- "European substratum words in Greek", 125 Jahre Indogermanistik in Graz, eds. Michaela Ofitsch & Christian Zinko. Graz: 2000, pp. 21–31.
- "Indo-European or substrate? φάτνη and κῆρυξ", Languages in Prehistoric Europe, eds. Alfred Bammesberger & Theo Vennemann. Heidelberg: 2003, pp. 109–116.
- "Armenian gišer and the Indo-European word for 'evening'", Per aspera ad asteriscos: Studia Indogermanica in honorem Iens Elmegård Rasmussen sexagenarii. Idibus Martiis anno MMIV, eds. Adam Hyllested et al. Innsbruck: 2004, pp. 59–61.
- "Palatalized consonants in Pre-Greek", Evidence and counter-evidence: essays in honour of Frederik Kortlandt, eds. Alexander Lubotsky et al. Amsterdam: 2008, pp. 45–56.
- Supervisor with Alexander Lubotsky of the Indo-European Etymological Dictionary, 1991 ff.
