= Michiel de Vaan =

Dutch linguist (born 1973)

- Born: March 19, 1973 (age 53); Son en Breugel, Netherlands
- Occupations: Historical linguist, Comparative linguist, Indo-Europeanist

Academic background
- Education: Leiden University

Michiel Arnoud Cor de Vaan (Dutch: [miˈxil də ˈvaːn]; born 1973) is a Dutch linguist and Indo-Europeanist. He taught comparative Indo-European linguistics, historical linguistics and dialectology at the University of Leiden until 2014, when he moved to the University of Lausanne in Switzerland. De Vaan had been at the University of Leiden since 1991, first as a student and later as a teacher.

He has published extensively on Limburgian, Dutch, Germanic, Albanian, Indo-Iranian and Indo-European linguistics and philology. He has published more than 100 papers, has written several books and has edited conference proceedings and a handbook of Indo-European. He wrote the etymological dictionary of Latin and other Italic languages as a contributor to the Leiden-based Indo-European Etymological Dictionary project.

De Vaan’s work has received praise, with the classicist Jonathan Powell claiming that the dictionary will be of “substantial value” to Indo-Europeanists. Powell commended the text for its supposed usage of “up to date” information and “modern conclusions on the sound changes between [Indo-European] and Latin”. Likewise, the linguist Rex Wallace stated that the work “suits the needs of specialists” and that the etymologies presented in the text reflected “the latest developments in the field of Indo-European linguistics.” However, Powell criticized de Vaan for a perceived lack of proper attention to semantics in certain etymologies and potential “perfunctory” underemphasis on “remodelling or onomatopoeia, which tend to interfere with the operation of the sound-laws.”

== Books ==
- with Javier Martínez: Introducción al avéstico. Madrid: Ediciones Clásicas, 2001. 140 pp.
  - English translation: Introduction to Avestan. Leiden / Boston: Brill, 2014.
- The Avestan Vowels. Amsterdam/Atlanta: Rodopi, 2003. 710 pp.
- (as editor): Germanic Tone Accents: Proceedings of the First International Workshop on Franconian Tone Accents, Leiden, 13–14 June 2003 (= Zeitschrift für Dialektologie und Linguistik 131). Stuttgart: Franz Steiner Verlag, 2006.
- Etymological Dictionary of Latin and the other Italic Languages. Brill. 2008. ISBN 9789004167971.
- with Alexander Lubotsky: Van Sanskriet tot Spijkerschrift. Breinbrekers uit alle talen. Amsterdam: Amsterdam University Press, 2010.
- (as reviser/editor): Robert S.P. Beekes, Comparative Indo-European Linguistics: An Introduction, 2nd edn. Revised and corrected by Michiel de Vaan. Amsterdam / Philadelphia: John Benjamins, 2011.
- with Rolf H. Bremmer Jr: Sporen van het Fries en de Friezen in Noord-Holland (2012, It Beaken : Tijdschrift van de Fryske Akademy, nr. 74).[Conference proceedings]
- The Dawn of Dutch: Language contact in the western Low Countries before 1200. John Benjamins, 2017. 613 pp.
