= Codex Calixtinus =

12th-century manuscript collection

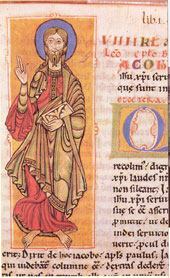
Detail from the Codex Calixtinus Folio 4r, showing Saint James the Great

The Codex Calixtinus (or Codex Compostellus) is a manuscript that is the main witness for the 12th-century Liber Sancti Jacobi ('Book of Saint James'), a pseudepigraph attributed to Pope Calixtus II. The principal author or compiler of the Liber is thus referred to as "Pseudo-Calixtus", but is often identified with the French scholar Aymeric Picaud. Its most likely period of compilation is 1138–1145.

It was intended as an anthology of background detail and advice for pilgrims following the Way of Saint James to the shrine of the apostle Saint James the Great, located in the cathedral of Santiago de Compostela, Galicia. The collection includes sermons, reports of miracles and liturgical texts associated with Saint James, and a set of polyphonic musical pieces. In it are also found descriptions of the route, works of art to be seen along the way, and the customs of the local people.

== History ==
The compilation of Codex Calixtinus predates 1173, most likely taking place during the late 1130s to early 1140s. This compilation is most likely due to the French scholar Aymeric Picaud. Each of the five books is prefaced with a pseudepigraphic letter attributed to Pope Calixtus II (d. 1124). The appendix contains a letter by Pope Innocent II (d. 1143), presenting the finished work to Santiago. There are some clues suggestive of a later date of around 1160, but none of them render impossible a date of around 1140. The miracles in book II are recounted with their dates, between 1080 and 1135, so that the completion of the compilation can with some certainty be dated to between 1135 and 1173, and with highest probability to the 1140s.

While the individual texts have a complex history, and each of the five books was probably in existence before their compilation in a single "encyclopedia for the pilgrimage and cult of St. James", Codex Calixtinus is the archetype manuscript for the composite Liber sancti Jacobi. For this reason, the terms Liber sancti Jacobi and Codex Calixtinus are often used interchangeably.

The historical content of the compilation is emergence of Saint James as a patron saint for the fight against Islam in Iberia. It has also been suggested that the book was written in deliberately bad Latin and is actually a kind of grammar book.

The oldest copy of the Codex, known as The Ripoll (after the monastery of Santa Maria de Ripoll in Catalonia) was made in 1173 by the monk Arnaldo de Monte. This date serves as terminus ante quem for the compilation of the Liber (excluding appendices). Many later copies of the work exist.

Codex Calixtinus was long held in the archives of the Cathedral of Santiago de Compostela and was rediscovered there by the Jesuit scholar Padre Fidel Fita in 1886. The first edition of the text was prepared in 1932 by Walter Muir Whitehill, and published in 1944 by Spain's Consejo Superior de Investigaciones Científicas, together with a musicological study by Silos's Dom Germán Prado O.S.B., and another on the miniature illustrations by Jesús Carro García.

The book was stolen from its security case in the cathedral's archives on 3 July 2011. Spanish press reports speculated that the theft may have been an attempt to embarrass the cathedral administration over lax security measures or an attempt to settle a personal or professional grievance.

On 4 July 2012, the codex was found in the garage of a former employee of the Cathedral. The former employee, considered the mastermind of the theft and three other members of his family were detained and questioned until one of them disclosed the location of the codex. There were also several other objects of worth stolen from the Cathedral found in the home of the former employee. The codex appeared to be in perfect condition but an in depth analysis will have to be performed in order to verify it. The former cathedral employee was convicted of the theft of the codex and of EUR 2.4 million from collection boxes, and was sentenced to ten years in prison in February 2015.

In 2017, the codex was added by UNESCO to its Memory of the World International Register, recognising it as globally important documentary heritage.

== Composition ==
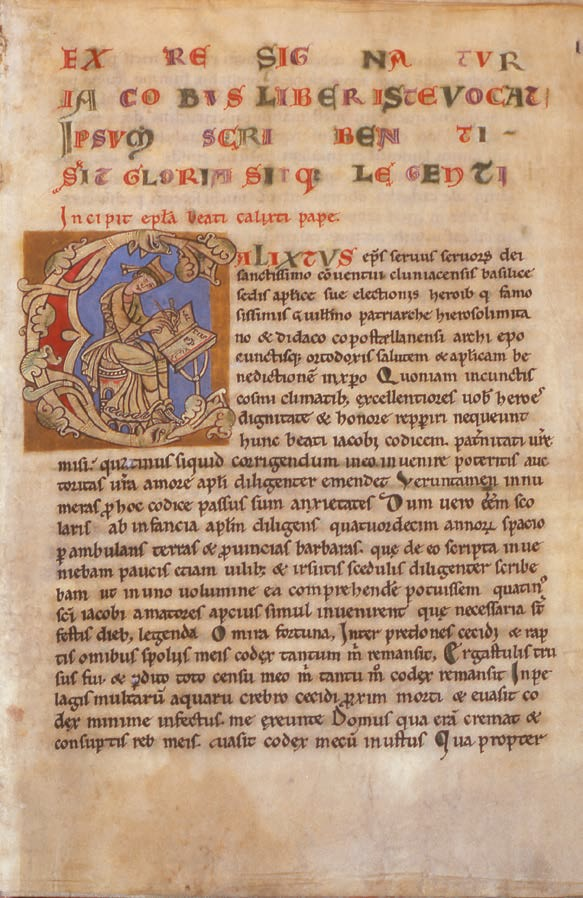
The opening letter purporting to be from Pope Calixtus II

The Santiago de Compostela copy comprises five volumes and two appendices, totalling 225 double-sided folios each 295 × 214 mm. Its oversized pages were trimmed down during a restoration in 1966. With some exceptions, each folio displays a single column of thirty-four lines of text. Book IV had been torn off in 1609, either by accident, theft or at the decree of King Philip III, and it was reinstated during the restoration.

The letter of Pope Calixtus II which opens the book, occupies both recto and verso of the first two folios. The author, who claims to be Calixtus II, tells how he collected many testimonies on the good deeds of Saint James, "traversing the cruel grounds and provinces for fourteen years". He also describes how the manuscript survived many hazards from fire to drowning. The letter is addressed "to the very holy assembly of the basilica of Cluny" and to "Diego, archbishop of Compostela".

=== Book I: Book of the Liturgies ===
Book I (Anthologia liturgica) accounts for almost half of all the codex and contains sermons and homilies concerning Saint James, two descriptions of his martyrdom and official liturgies for his veneration. Its relative size and the information it contains on the spiritual aspects of the pilgrimage make it the heart of the codex. The Veneranda Dies sermon is the longest work in Book One and seems to have been part of the feast day celebrations for St. James (July 25). It commemorates the life, death and moving the remains of St. James to the church in Compostela; discusses the route to Compostela in both physical and spiritual terms; and celebrates the blessings of the saint bestowed on the pilgrims of the route, on Spain and on Galicia.

=== Book II: Book of the Miracles ===
The hagiographic Book II (De miraculis sancti Jacobi) is an account of twenty-two miracles across Europe attributed to Saint James, both during his life and after his death. The recipients and witnesses to these miracles are often pilgrims.

=== Book III: Transfer of the body to Santiago ===
Book III (Liber de translatione corporis sancti Jacobi ad Compostellam) is the briefest of the five books and describes moving Saint James' body from Jerusalem to his tomb at Libredón in Galicia. Book III also describes the journey of Theodore and Athanasius, the disciples of Saint James, as they moved his body from Padrón in a cart pulled by oxen to the Libredón forest (previously Liberum Donum), where he was buried. The journey is also described in stories involving Queen Lupa.

It also tells of the custom started by the first pilgrims of gathering souvenir sea shells from the Galician coast. The scallop shell is a symbol for Saint James.

=== Book IV: The History of Charlemagne and Roland ===
Book IV (Historia Caroli Magni et Rotholandi) is attributed to Archbishop Turpin of Reims and commonly referred to as Pseudo-Turpin, although it is the work of an anonymous writer of the 12th century. It describes the coming of Charlemagne to Spain, his defeat at the Battle of Roncevaux Pass and the death of the knight Roland. It relates how Saint James then appeared in a dream to Charlemagne, urging him to liberate his tomb from the Moors and showing him the direction to follow by the route of the Milky Way. This association has given the Milky Way an alternate name in Spain of Camino de Santiago. The chapter also includes an account of Roland's defeat of the giant Saracen Ferragut.

This widely publicized and multi-copied book describing the legend of Santiago Matamoros or 'St. James the Moorslayer' is considered by scholars to be an early example of propaganda by the Catholic Church to drum up recruits for the military Order of Santiago. The Order was formed in order to help protect church interests in northern Spain from Moorish invaders. The Military Orders of the Middle Ages were closely associated with the Crusades. In later years the legend became somewhat of an embarrassment in its depiction of Saint James as a bloodthirsty avenger 800 years after his death. King Philip III ordered that Book IV be removed from the codex and for a while it circulated as a separate volume.

Throughout northern Spain along the Way of St. James known as the Camino Francés, most churches and cathedrals still have statuary and chapels applauding 'Saint James the Moorslayer'. Today this legend in northern Spain has cultural and historical significance that is completely separate from any of the original intentions by the Catholic Church.

=== Book V: A Guide for the Traveller ===
Book V (Iter pro peregrinis ad Compostellam) is a wealth of practical advice for pilgrims, informing them where they should stop, relics they should venerate, sanctuaries they should visit, bad food they should be wary of and commercial scams, including in the author's opinion, other churches who claimed to hold relics of St. James. The book provides a valuable insight into the life of the 12th-century pilgrim. It also describes the city of Santiago de Compostela and its cathedral. The popular appeal of Book V led to it achieving the greatest fame, and it has been described as the first tourist's guide book. Among Basque scholars, this account is considered as highly important because it contains some of the earliest Basque words and phrases of the post-Roman period.

In 1993, UNESCO placed the Spanish section of the pilgrimage on the World Heritage List, describing it as "a testimony to the power of the Christian faith among people of all social classes". The French section joined the list in 1998 when UNESCO declared the cultural and historical importance of the World Heritage Sites of the Routes of Santiago de Compostela in France.

== Music ==
Three parts of the Codex Calixtinus include music: Book I, Appendix I, and Appendix II. These passages are of great interest to musicologists as they include early examples of polyphony. The codex contains the first known composition for three voices, the conductus Congaudeant catholici (Let all Catholics rejoice together); however, the extreme dissonance encountered when all three voices perform together has led some scholars to suggest that this was not the original intention.

The conductus Jacobe sancte tuum repetito appears in both monophonic and polyphonic settings with the codex. The codex attributes this work to an unnamed Beneventan bishop known as "antiquus episcopus Beneventinus"; however, the attribution has been questioned by scholars as the Beneventan was an archbishopric from the tenth century. The interest in the music has continued to the present day with modern recordings commercially available.

== See also ==
- List of codices

== Edition ==
- Karp, Theodore, ed. (1992). The Polyphony of Saint Martial and Santiago de Compostela. Vol. 1–2. Oxford: Clarendon. ISBN 978-0-19-816185-1.
- Wagner, Peter, ed. (1931). Die Gesänge der Jakobusliturgie zu Santiago de Compostela aus dem sog. Codex Calixtinus hrsg. und komm. von Peter Wagner. Collectanea Friburgensia N.F. Vol. 20. Fribourg: Unversitätsbuchhandlung Hess.

== Bibliography ==
- Coffey, Thomas F.; Dunn, Maryjane (2019) The Miracles and Translatio of St James. Italica Pr. ISBN 978-1-59910-325-9
- Coffey, Thomas F.; Dunn, Maryjane (2021) The Sermons and Liturgy of St James. Italica Pr. ISBN 978-1-59910-326-6
- Grell, Ole Peter (2012). "1". In Ole Peter Grell (ed.). Contexts - Making sense of things:an introduction to material culture. Piers Baker-Bates. The Open University. ISBN 978-1-8487-3951-2.
- Melczer, William (1993). The Pilgrim's Guide to Santiago De Compostela (English translation). Italica Pr. ISBN 0-934977-25-9.
- Murphy, Denis (2011). The Pilgrim's Guide: Online English Translation.
- Stones, Alison (1998). Pilgrim's Guide to Santiago de Compostela: A Critical Edition. Harvey Miller. ISBN 978-0-905203-52-2.
- Webb, Diana (2002). Medieval European Pilgrimage, c.700-c.1500. Macmillan. ISBN 0-333-76260-6.
- Van Herwaarden, J.; Shaffer, Wendie (2003). "Chapter 10". Between Saint James and Erasmus. Gunter Narr Verlag. ISBN 90-04-12984-7.
- Williams, John; Stones, Alison, eds. (1992). The Codex Calixtinus and the Shrine of St. James. Gunter Narr Verlag. ISBN 3-8233-4004-2.
- Coffey, Thomas F.; Davidson, Linda Kay; Dunn, Maryjane (2008). The Miracles of Saint James (English translation). Italica Press. ISBN 978-0934977388.
- Poole, Kevin R. (2014). The Chronicle of Pseudo-Turpin (English translation). Italica Press. ISBN 978-1-59910-289-4.
- Kaydeda, ed. (1992). Iacobus Codex Calixtinus facsimile deluxe edition. Kaydeda. ISBN 978-84-86879-33-4.
