= Llazar Bozo =

Albania freedom fighter (1882–1956)

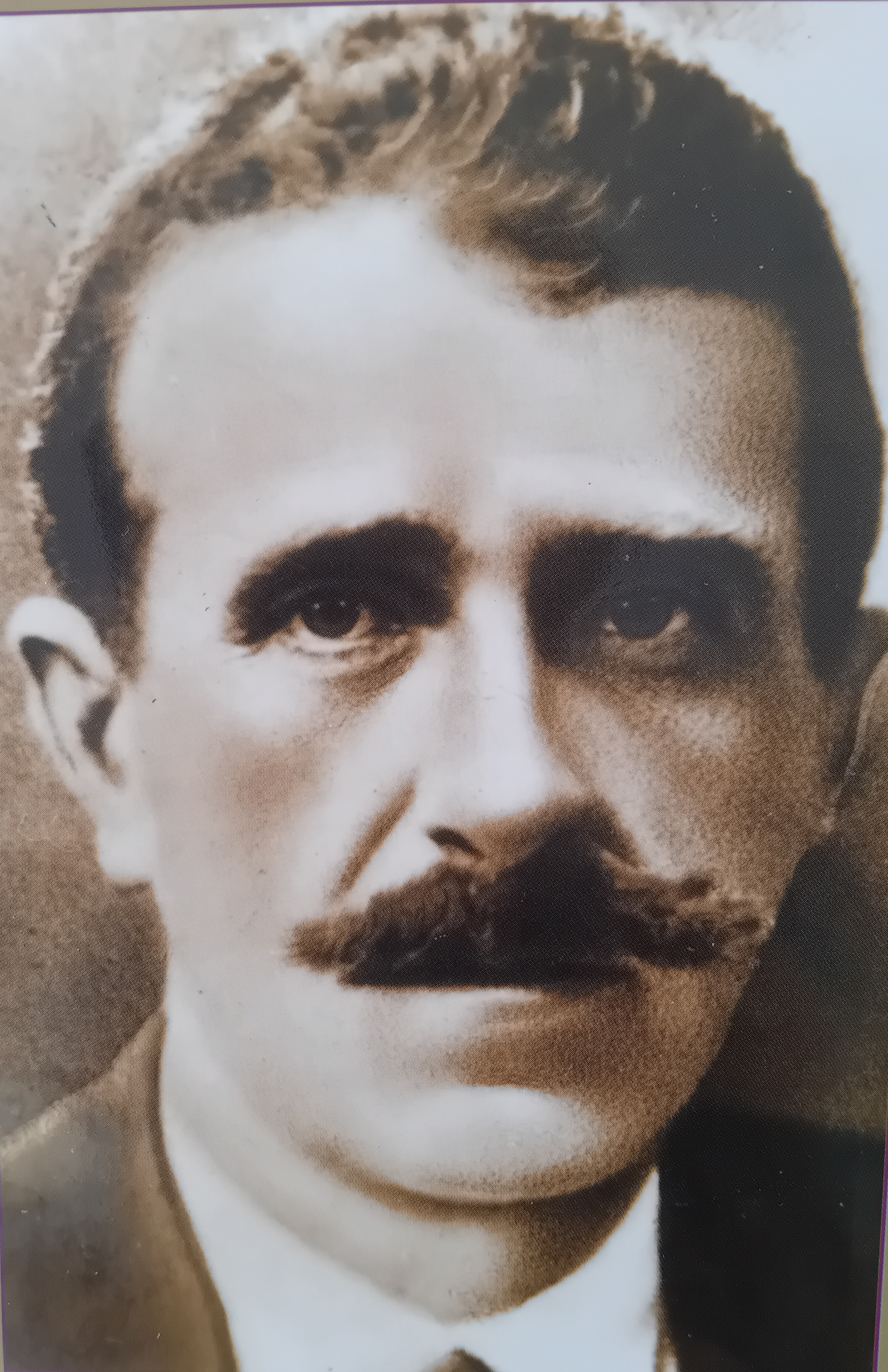
- Born: January 1882; Kolonjë, Fier, Ottoman Empire (now Albania)
- Died: 18 April 1956 (aged 74); Albania
- Monuments: Park and monument in Lushnjë; Street in Fier city Street in Kolonjë, Fier
- Other names: Kapedan Llazar Bozo
- Occupations: Revolutionary; freedom-fighter; commander; philanthropist; administrator
- Known for: Anti-Ottoman independentist activities Liberation of Lushnja; 1914–1915 Muslim revolts in Albania; Congress of Lushnjë; Vlora War; Atdheu Federation; June Revolution; 1935 Uprisings of Fier; WWII National Liberation Movement (Albania); Peza Conference; Conference of Labinot; 1943-1944 Winter Operation (Albania); LANÇ counter-offensive in Albania (1944); Congress of Përmet; Autocephaly of the Orthodox Church; Congress of Berat; Ecclesiastical Congress of Korça
- Notable work: Caretaker of Holy Trinity Chapel, Bell tower, Church of Saint Mary and Ardenica Monastery; Co-founder and donor of the Myzeqe boarding school in Ardenica Monastery
- Movement: Albanian National Awakening; 1914–1915 Muslim revolts in Albania; Congress of Lushnjë; Vlora War; Atdheu Federation; June Revolution; 1935 Uprisings of Fier; WWII National Liberation Movement (Albania); Autocephaly of the Albanian Orthodox Church
- Spouse: Kaliopi Bozo (née: Goxhomani)
- Honours: Citizen of Honor Lushnjë; Order of the Flag; Order of Bravery; Medal of Remembrance

Llazar Bozo (January 1882 – 18 April 1956) was an Albanian activist, freedom-fighter, commander, benefactor and delegate representing Myzeqe region. Llazar Bozo was active in the political and liberation events of the Albanian National Awakening, as well as in the national liberation movements of the two World Wars, events that shaped the statehood of modern Albania.

== Early life ==
Llazar Bozo was born in January 1882 in Kolonjë, Fier, in Ottoman Albania (now, modern Albania) of Aromanian origin with early roots from Grabovë, Albania.

During the depopulation wave of the Aromanian settlements of Grabovë and Moscopole in the late 17th and 18th century, his family had to flee and move to Kolonjë in Myzeqe region in Albania.

Llazar studied in the school of the Ardenica Monastery.

Llazar Bozo's wealth had its source from his activities in producing and international trading of manufacture, jewelry, tobacco, wine, olive oil, food and clothing.

== Independence movement ==
=== Komitadji ===
Llazar Bozo began his activity as a Komitadji (Albanian: Komit) in 1906 and gets involved in anti-Ottoman activities with other komitas and freedom-fighters with whom he had friendship such as Çerçiz Topulli, Mihal Grameno, Themistokli Gërmenji etc.

His activities during this period were mainly in the regions of Berat, Korcë, Gjirokastër.

The victory of the Battle of Mashkullorë (Albanian: Beteja e Mashkullorës) after the Ottoman binbashi of Gjirokastër was assassinated on February 25, 1908, by the cheta of Albanian rebels led by Çerçiz Topulli, triggered the premises for a general anti-Ottoman uprising.

In 1910 Llazar Bozo with other komitadjis, created a first cheta of armed rebel fighters and performed attacks against the authorities of the Ottoman garrisons in Lushnjë.

In 1911, the organised chetas were circulating in the Karbunare forests, Lushnjë.

In May 1911, the “Freedom or Death” uprising Committee (Albanian: Komiteti kryengritës “Liri o vdekje”) in Vlorë, planned the armed uprising program against the Ottoman regime, and Albanians were preparing for general armed revolts in Mirditë, Shkodër, Kosovë and Toskëri in south Albania.

In the Myzeqe region was decided to attack the Ottoman military garrisons of Lushnjë.

Three chetas of armed fighters led respectively by Llazar Bozo, Taulla Sinani and Besim Nuri attacked the Ottoman military garrisons and administration, liberated Lushnja and raised the Albanian flag.

=== Declaration of independence ===
==== Context ====
On November 19, 1912, after a diplomatic campaign in Europe, patriots led by Ismail Qemal Bey Vlora set off from Trieste, Italy to Durrës, Albania.

The city of Vlora was blockaded by the Greek military fleet.

On November 11, 1912, Ismail Qemali set off with delegates from central Albania from Durrës towards Vlora to declare the independence of Albania on November 28, 1912.

The Ottoman Wali of Ioannina, in a secret telegram ordered that Ismail Qemali be arrested dead or alive as soon as he entered Lushnja. For this, a detachment of Ottoman gendarmes was sent to the village of Gramsh, Lushnja.

==== Mission ====
Ismail Qemali's arrest was prevented thanks to the patriots and the Myzeqe.

Ismail Qemali was able to pass safely through the villages of Cermë Bicak, Cermë Boshk, Cermë Pasha, Cermë Ciflik, Sulzotaj, Divjakë, Xeng, Mizë, Kryekuq, Babunjë, Libofshë.

Until the village of Petovë, Ismail Qemali was accompanied by the Libofshë patriots Ikonom Dhima, Tuni Gjergji, Zoi Marini, Zoi Ndreko, etc.

Llazar Bozo and his cheta of armed fighters ensured Ismail Qemali a safe passage through the Myzeqe region, from Cerma, the Ardenica monastery and Libofshë to Vlora, where was held the act of declaring the independence of Albania in the Assembly of Vlorë on November 28, 1912.

Llazar Bozo communicated to Ismail Qemali the joyful news of the liberation of Lushnja, with Myzeqe region and of the raising of the Albanian flag in Lushnja, on November 27, 1912 that took place a few days before the declaration of Albanian independence in Vlora on November 28, 1912.

== World War I ==
In 1913, all southern Albania, except for Vlora and Berat, was under Greek occupation.

Northern Albania was under Serbo-Montenegrin occupation.

In central Albania, after the withdrawal of Serbian forces, Essad Pasha Toptani established his power, who on October 12, 1913 gathered an "Elderly" in Durrës and proclaimed a separate government. The ties with the Vlora government were severed.

Two centers of power were created in Albania. The Vlora Government and the Essad Pasha Toptani Government that was mainly supported by the great landlords and the great Ottoman era beys.

Llazar Bozo sided with the principles of the declaration of Albanian independence by Ismail Qemali of the Vlora government.

=== Peasant Revolts 1913-1915 ===
In Myzeqe region, the oppression of the peasantry was severe.

Llazar Bozo with his armed groups, fought against the power and the forces of Essad Pasha Toptani Government in the years 1913-1914 during the 1914–1915 Peasant revolts in Albania.

On January 24, 1913, the Lushnja platoons commanded by Llazar Bozo and Taullah Sinani destroyed the Essadist forces led by Dervish Bey Bicaku.

In May–June 1914, the rebel forces of Myzeqe region clashed in Krutje with the forces of the Kavaja feudal lords in fierce fighting for five days in a row. About 500-800 Essadist forces burned the villages of Myzeqe and reached Lushnja.

The Peasant Uprising of Central Albania led by Haxhi Qamili also spread to Myzeqe region.

All of Myzeqe region was involved in the uprising, and defeated the forces of Azis Pasha etc.

Llazar Bozo, who had initially gathered about 500 fighters, met Haxhi Qamili in Et'hem Bey Mosque in Tirana in June 1914 with the aim of coordinating the peasant uprising forces against the government forces of the Essad Pasha Toptani and the occupying Serbian-Montenegrin armies.

On July 11, 1914 in Maliq, an armistice was signed with the Greek forces.

On July 13, 1914, the rebel forces entered Berat, and the government forces left Fier, which was under pressure from the insurgent forces led by Llazar Bozo. The fighting spread to the banks of the Vjosa River.

Haxhi Qamili, led 3300 peasant rebel forces towards Berat.

The forces led by Llazar Bozo also set off towards Berat, joined by the exploited farmers of the province.

On August 8–9, 1914, the rebel forces defeated the government forces led by the prefect of Berat.

On August 11, 1914, the government forces were badly defeated by the rebel forces in Fier.

==== Aftermath of the uprising ====
Essad Pasha Toptani, after emerging from the 200-day isolation imposed by Haxhi Qamili's rebels, returns, and with the help of Serbian forces that attack Albania on June 2, 1915, as well as mercenary forces, undertakes a campaign of terror against the villages that had participated in the peasant uprising.

The rebellion was crushed.

==== Death sentences ====
The leaders of the Peasant Uprising, Haxhi Qamili and Musa Qazimi, are sentenced to death by the court headed by Xhelal Bey Zogu.

Llazar Bozo was also sentenced to death, in absentia, by the Essadist court headed by Xhelal Zogu.

The court also sentenced his friend Nebi Bali, the commander of the rebel forces in the Peqin and Darsia areas, to death by hanging.

Llazar Bozo was forced to temporarily take refuge in Italy, while his house in Kolonjë, Lushnje, was burned down and his family was forced to hide in the houses of the Myzeqe people to escape reprisals.

==== Growing reputation ====
The participation and contribution of Commander Llazar Bozo in the Albanian Peasant Uprising for the rights of the oppressed peasantry, further increased his authority in the Myzeqe region as a brave commander and patriot.

The newspaper “Zëri i Shqipërisë”, which was run by a committee headed by Themistokli Gërmenji, in the article entitled “The Cause of the First Uprising in Myzeqe” dated March 29, 1915, describes him as “…the tireless and famous Llazar Bozo…”.

==== Pacification commissions ====
Llazar Bozo played a role in the creation of peace commissions, to unite the people against the tactics promoted by Essad Pasha Toptani forces to divide the people of Myzeqe on religious grounds in 1914.

In a peace commission were Mihal Grameno, Cilka Coruni from Vlora, Llazar Bozo from Kolonja of Myzeqe, etc.

== Congress of Lushnjë 1920 ==
=== The necessity of a national congress ===
The Treaty of London of April 26, 1915 that planned the division of Albania.

After the agreement of August 20, 1919 of the provisional government of Durrës with Italy that recognised, among others, the sovereignty of Italy over Vlora;

In the Albanian National Movement began to spread the idea of calling a national assembly, which would save the country from dissolution. The first initiatives, but without result, were undertaken by patriots in Tirana, then in Elbasan, Berat, Krujë and Shijak.

This important task was then taken over by an initiative committee created in the city of Lushnja by patriotic activists such as Llazar Bozo, Besim Nuri, Taullah Sinani, Jakov Bozo, Eshref Frashëri, Zija Mullai, Andre Pepa, etc.

=== Contribution to the congress ===
Llazar Bozo was a member of the Initiating Committee of the Congress of Lushnjë.

Llazar Bozo was a delegate, representative of Myzeqe and signatory in the proceedings of the Congress of Lushnjë.

Llazar Bozo was charged also with the task of organising all the work for the smooth running of the Congress of Lushnjë, responsible for the subcommittees for preparing the conditions for organising the Congress of Lushnjë, receiving of the delegates, their accommodation and food, etc.

Llazar Bozo was appointed Commander of the armed forces for the protection of the Congress of Lushnjë.

The Italian army, and the Government of Durrës demonstrated military force in order to prevent the Congress of Lushnja.

Two military battalions led by Mufid Bey Libohova, with the support of the commander of the Italian occupation Settimio Piacentini in Vlora, set out to prevent the organisation of the Congress of Lushnjë, but they did not succeed.

On January 15, 1920 everything was ready for the Congress of Lushnjë.

=== Congress of Lushnja outcomes ===
The Congress of Lushnjë concluded its work on January 21–31, 1920.

The decisions of the Congress of Lushnja were fundamental for preserving the integrity and the future of the sovereign Albanian state. Its decisions preceded the War of Vlora a few months later in 1920.

At this congress it was decided that Tirana would be declared the capital of Albania and that a new modern democratic government would be created.

== Vlora war 1920 ==
A consequence of the decisions of the Congress of Lushnja was the expulsion of foreign occupying armies from the territory of independent Albania.

=== Creation of the National Defence Committee of Lushnja ===
With the formation of the “National Defense Committee” in Vlora, the “National Defense Committee” in Lushnja was also created by Llazar Bozo, Taullah Sinani, teacher Rrapi Mërtiri, Zoi Ndreko, Naun Prifti and Sil Keqi.

=== Elected Member of the Operational Headquarters ===
Captain (Albanian: Kapedan) Llazar Bozo was elected a member of the Operational Headquarters (Albanian: Shtabi Operativ Luftarak) that was located in Novoselë, Vlora, to coordinate combat operations in the War of Vlora.

=== Participation in battles ===
The fighters from Myzeqe region participated in the fierce liberation battles in the War of Vlora in 1920, mainly in Novoselë, Babicë, and the surroundings of the city of Vlora.

In July 1920, Captain (Albanian: Kapedan) Llazar Bozo personally led one of the night combat operations to capture the 800m high, well-fortified concrete hill where the Italian military bases, barracks and artillery were located, directing the freedom fighters to attack from the steep cliff of the hill.

After midnight, the fierce combat operation ended successfully for the Albanian side.

Among the brave fighters who fell on this front were Shaban Mullahu, Tafil Shabani, Misir Cela, etc.

When some Albanian fighters continued to kill Italian soldiers even after the latter surrendered, Captain Llazar Bozo gave the order: “Brothers, stop! Captives are not killed. We are not barbarians!”.

The Italian captive soldiers were lined up and sent to Llaktund, Vlora.

== Atdheu federation ==
Representatives of 25 democratic societies from all over Albania decided to unite in a single society that was called “Atdheu”.

The “Atdheu” Federation led by Avni Rustemi played an important role in the unification of the democratic patriotic forces of the country.

Llazar Bozo and Zija Mullai were elected delegates from Lushnja to the Congress for the formation of the great Federation “Atdheu” in the cinema “Përparimi” in Vlora, on April 25–28, 1921.

The Congress had 47 delegates, 110 listeners, 5 representatives of the press.

Llazar Bozo led the centre of the "Atdheu" Federation for Lushnja for a year, dealing with national issues, including meetings with his collaborators and friends Avni Rustemi and Halim Xhelo.

== June Revolution 1924 ==
=== Delegate of assembly and member of the headquarters ===
On May 23, 1924 the assembly of the Vlora region, in the “Përparimi” theater in Vlora, decided to join the uprising of the Democratic Anti-Bourgeois Revolution of June.

Llazar Bozo was a participant in this assembly, as a delegate representing the Myzeqe region.

Llazar Bozo was a member of the headquarters of the insurgent forces of the June Revolution 1924.

=== Revolution rebellion ===
On May 31, 1924 the two operational forces of the South depart, one from Vlora towards Fier, the other from Përmet towards Berat. The fighting was concentrated in two directions: Vlora-Fier-Lushnjë, Përmet-Berat-Lushnjë.

Fierce fighting took place in Libofshë, Ardenicë and Divjakë, where government forces left over 43 people killed, including a captain and an aspirant.

The revolutionary forces advanced in three directions: Peqin-Pezë-Tirana, Kavajë-Ndroq-Tirana, Kavajë-Shijak-Tirana. The rebel forces took Tirana on June 10, 1924.

On June 16, 1924 the new government is created with Fan Noli as prime minister.

== Uprisings of Fier 1935 ==
=== Preparations for the uprising ===
In 1934, Llazar Bozo and Taullah Sinani founded and led the branch of the organisation "Secret Organisation” (Albanian: “Organizata e Fshehtë”) for Lushnja.

On May 4, 1985 Llazar Bozo and Riza Cerova meet in Karbunarë to cooperate in the area of and Skrapar.

Llazar Bozo and Taullah Sinani managed to gather 200 armed forces for the anti-monarchy Zog I uprising, and together with the armed forces from Fier, the number went to over 300 forces.

=== The uprising of Fier 1935 ===
On August 14, 1935 at 15h00' in front of the municipality in Fier, the uprising began for the overthrow of the monarchy of King Zog I, and the proclamation of the Republic.

The insurgent forces of Lushnja began the first actions.

The uprising was compromised by the leakage of information, before the action.

After the attack of the government forces, and the clash with them, on August 15, 1935, being outnumbered, Llazar Bozo gives the order for his forces to withdraw and disperse.

The uprising forces disperse in the hills of Lushnja, Durrës, Divjakë, Fier and Mallakastër.

=== Aftermath of the uprising ===
The uprising was suppressed by the government og king Zog I taking repressive measures.

On August 15, 1935 a curfew is declared in the cities of Berat, Lushnja, Skrapar and Vlorë.

=== Death sentences ===
The government created a special political court to punish the insurgents.

Llazar Bozo was sentenced to death, in absentia, by the special political court.

Thanks to the reaction of public opinion, the death sentence of Llazar Bozo and 41 others is commuted to prison sentences.

Llazar Bozo temporarily takes refuge in Rome, Italy, and was never arrested.

== World War II ==
=== National Conference of Pezë 1942 ===
On September 16, 1942, Llazar Bozo participated as a delegate representing Lushnja in the National Conference of Peza.

Llazar Bozo was a member of the leadership of the Antifascist National Liberation Council of the Berat District.

In the proceedings of the Peza Conference, Llazar Bozo was elected a member of the General National Liberation Council (Albanian: “Këshillit të Pergjithshëm Nacional Clirimtar”) of the National Liberation Movement (Albania).

=== Creation of the first Partisan group of Myzeqe ===
On December 26, 1942 was founded, in the Robo house in Kolonjë, the first partisan group of Myzeqe having the first 21 partisan fighters.

On April 20, 1943, all the partisans of Myzeqe gathered in the Sene forest near the village of Këmishtaj, where they formed the First Partisan Battalion. Rahman Uruçi was elected commander of the battalion, with commissar Muharrem Shabani, deputy commander Irakli Llazar Bozo and deputy commissar Loni Dhamo. Spiro Moisiu was also appointed military advisor and played an important role in the military organisation of the battalion.

The leaders of the Anti-Fascist National Liberation Movement of Myzeqe made every effort to reach an agreement with the leaders of the National Front for a joint fight against fascism and to avoid divisive actions for a fratricidal war. Several meetings were held, such as the one in the village of Lumth at the house of Tonç Velo, where Spiro Moisiu and Llazar Bozo represented the National Front, while Xhaferr Bali and Hamit Matjani represented the National Front.

Myzeqe region supported mainly the National Liberation War, in which 3,450 partisans from Myzeqe region only, were engaged and 197 martyrs fall on the battlefield against the nazi-fascist occupation of Albania during World War II.

=== National Conference of Labinot 1943 ===
Llazar Bozo was one of the 50 delegates at the Labinot Conference held on September 4–9, 1943 in Labinot-Mal, Elbasan.

=== Winter Operation 1943-1944 ===
On August 2, 1943, in Karkanjoz, Berat, Llazar Bozo was elected member of Partisan Forces Headquarters for the Berat region (Albanian: Shtabi Forcave Partizane për qarkun e Beratit).^{[1]}

Llazar Bozo participated in the LANÇ counter-offensive in Albania (1944).

Llazar Bozo participated in the battles in Sulovë, Tomorricë, Skrapar, and in Gorë-Opar, Korça.^{[22]}

=== National Congress of Përmet 1944 ===
Llazar attended as a member, the meeting of the Presidency of the Antifascist National Liberation Council (Albanian: Kryesisa e Këshillit Antifashist Nacionalclirimtar) in Helmës, Skrapar on 15 April 1944.

Llazar Bozo participatd as a delegate of the Berat district in the Congress of Përmet, which held its proceedings on May 24, 1944.

Llazar Bozo was elected member of the General Anti-Fascist National Liberation Council (Albanian: Këshilli i Përgjithshëm Antifashist Nacionalclirimtar), with a mandate of May 24, 1944 – December 16, 1945.

=== Aftermath ===
The Antifascist National Liberation Army of Albanian partisans entirely liberated Albania from the nazi-fascist occupation on November 29, 1944, putting Albania on the side of the winners of World War II.

== Benefactor ==
=== Administrator of Ardenica Monatery ===
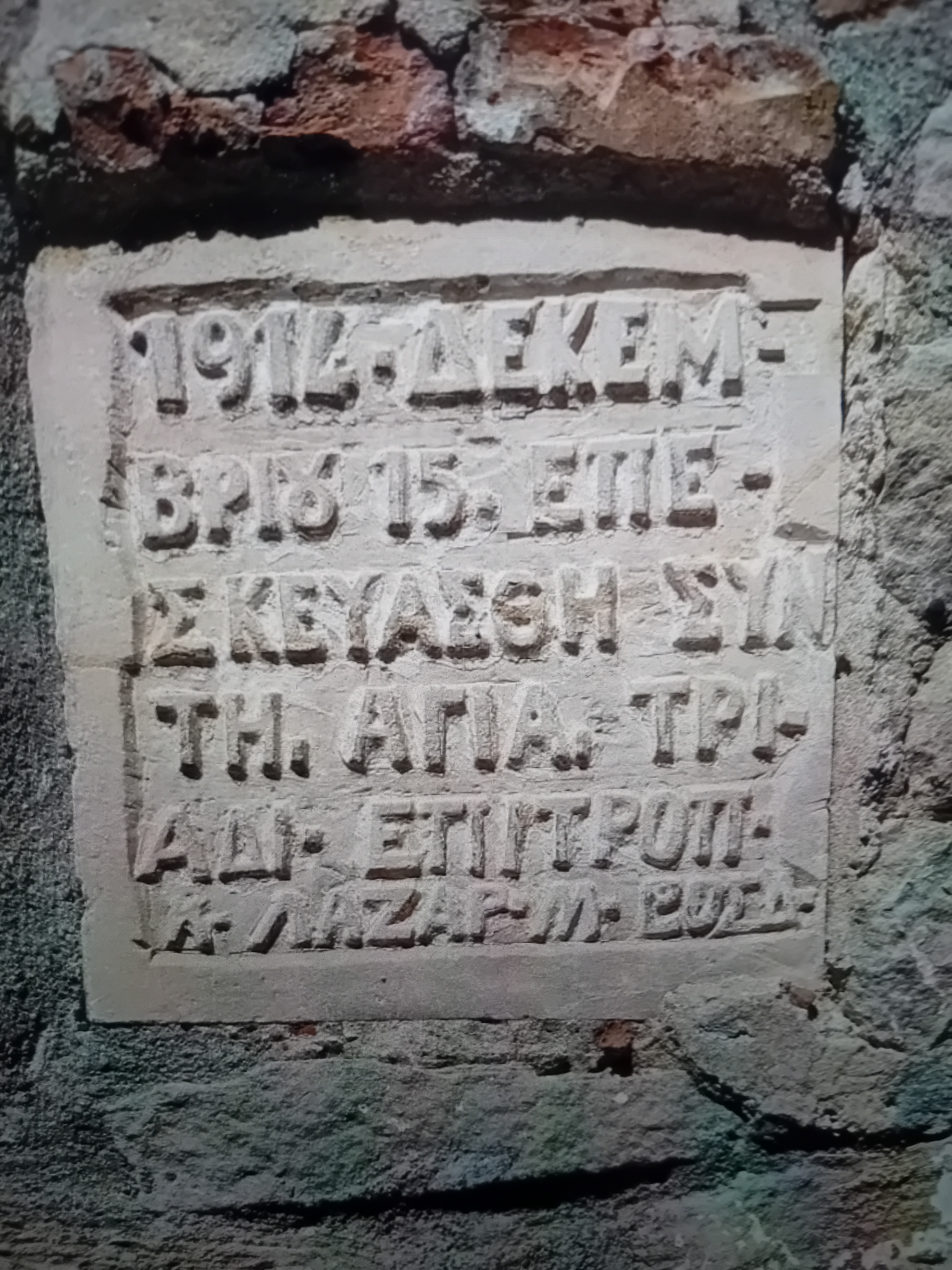
Wall inscription about the constructions done by the administrator Llazar Bozo in the Ardenica Monastery in 1914.

Llazar Bozo, like his father Mihal, was administrator, caretaker and protector of the Ardenica Monastery.

Llazar Bozo financed, maintained, rebuilt and built some of the objects of the monastery, as is also witnessed on the various tablets with carved mural inscriptions of December 15, 1914, 1922, 1925, May 29, 1925, etc.

==== Holy Trinity Chapel ====
The Holy Trinity Chapel was built ceinturies before the Ardenica Monastery that was established in 1282.

In 1914 and 1922, the Holy Trinity Chapel (Albanian: Kisha e Shën Triadhës) and the four northern chambers were financed and fundamentally rebuilt by the administrator (Albanian: kujdestar, epitrop) of the Ardenica Monastery, Mr. Llazar M. Bozo.

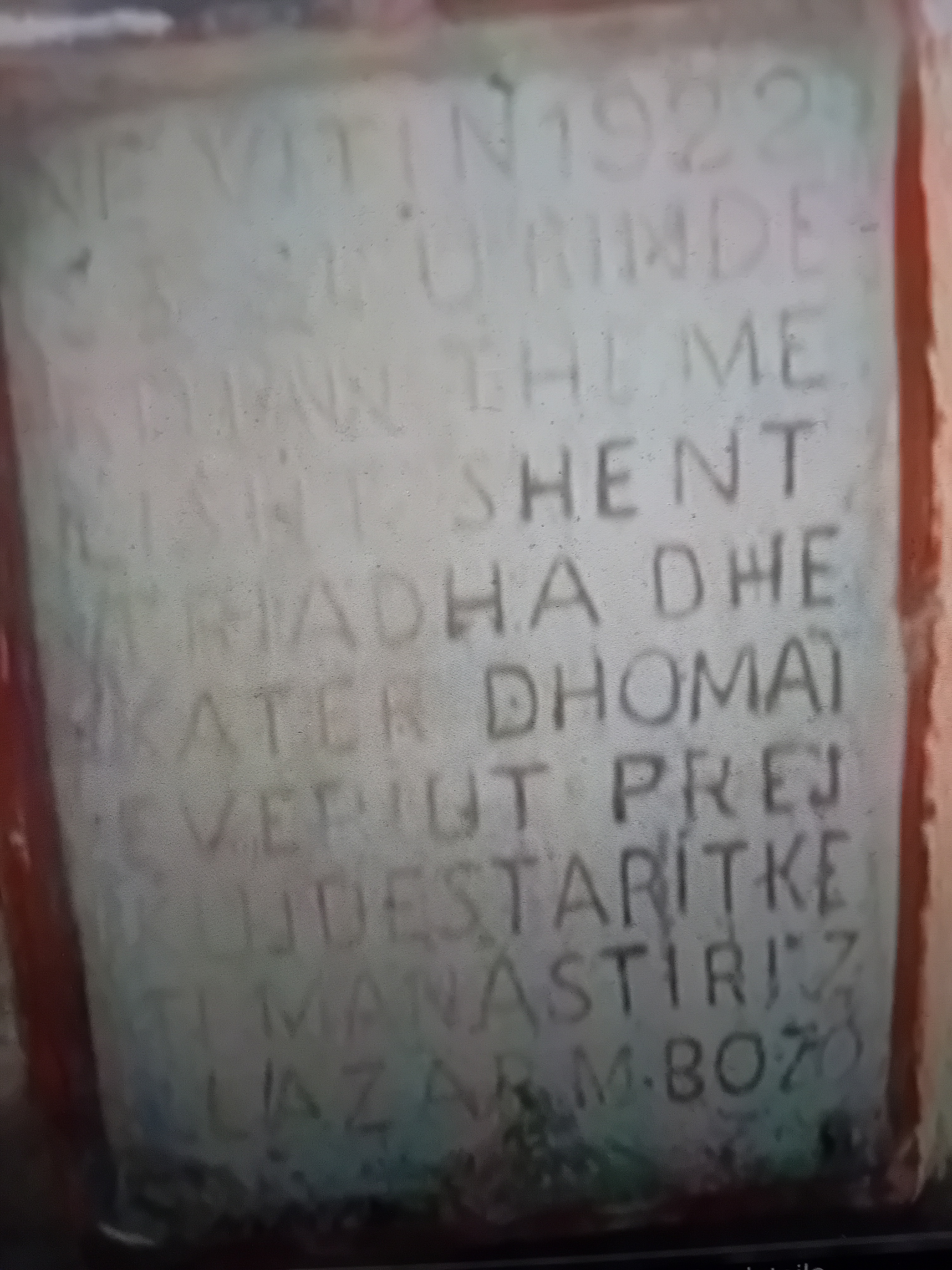
Wall inscription about the constructions done by the administrator Llazar Bozo in the Ardenica Monastery in 1922.

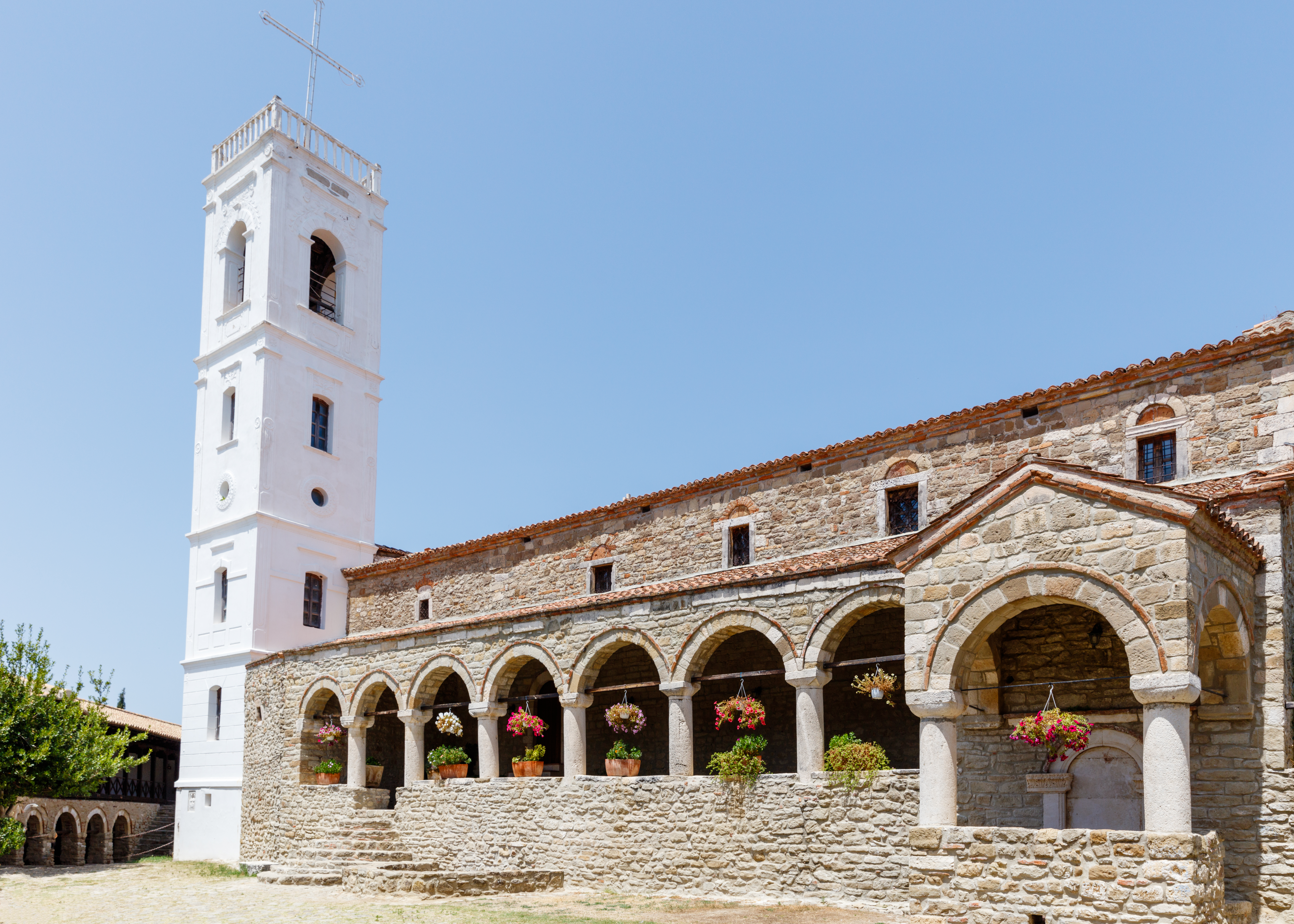
Church of Saint Mary and the Bell tower in the Ardenica Monastery

==== Bell Tower ====
In 1925, the 4x4 and 30m high, Bell Tower was financed and built by the administrator of the Monastery, Mr. Llazar Bozo. To climb its five floors, one had to climb 64 wooden steps.

In the bell tower there are two bells purchased in Trieste, Italy by Konstandina Kostaq Xoxa in 1937, Berat and Theodhor A. Xhumurteka in Berat in 1937.

==== Church of Saint Mary ====
In 1925 Llazar Bozo as the administrator of the monastery rebuilt the Church of Saint Mary.

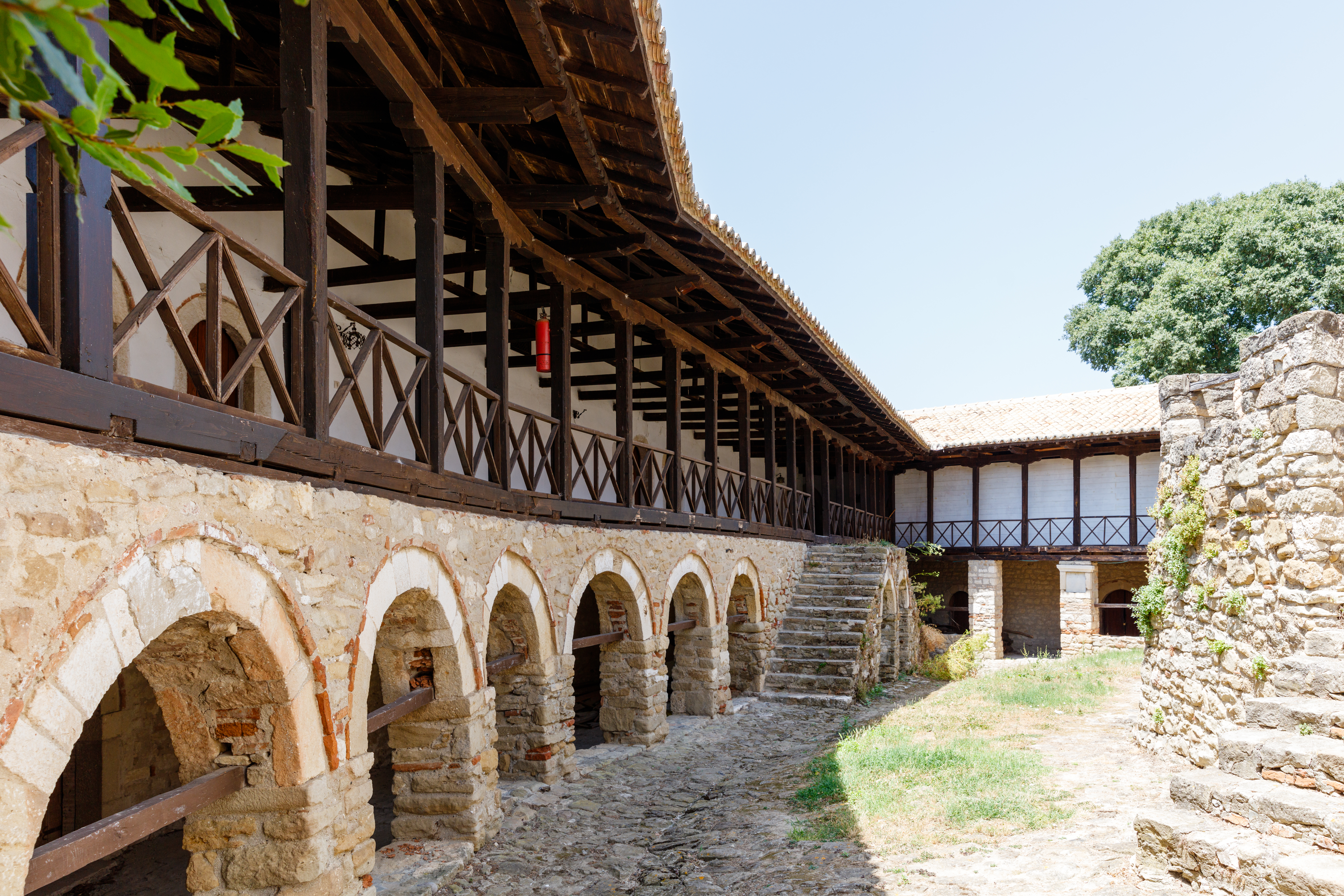
Ardenica Monastery

=== Philanthropy ===
The administrator of the Ardenica Monastery Llazar Bozo, and the teachers Jani Minga, Naun Prifti in 1922 proposed to the central government the organisation of a boarding school for the youth of Myzeqe, which became functional during the 1920s, the example of which would be followed in other areas of Albania.

In 1922, the Minister of Education Rexhep Mitrovica allowed the opening of the institution. The teachers who taught at the monastery were: Jani Minga, Anastas Ikonomi, Rrapi Mërtiri and Naun Prifti. Throughout the years of the functioning of this boarding school, Llazar Bozo financed the food as a donation for 50 students regardless of religion, on the condition that the students come from poorer classes of Myzeqe.

This generosity is also appreciated in government and church documents.

== Autocephaly of Orthodox church ==
=== Congress of Berat 1922 ===
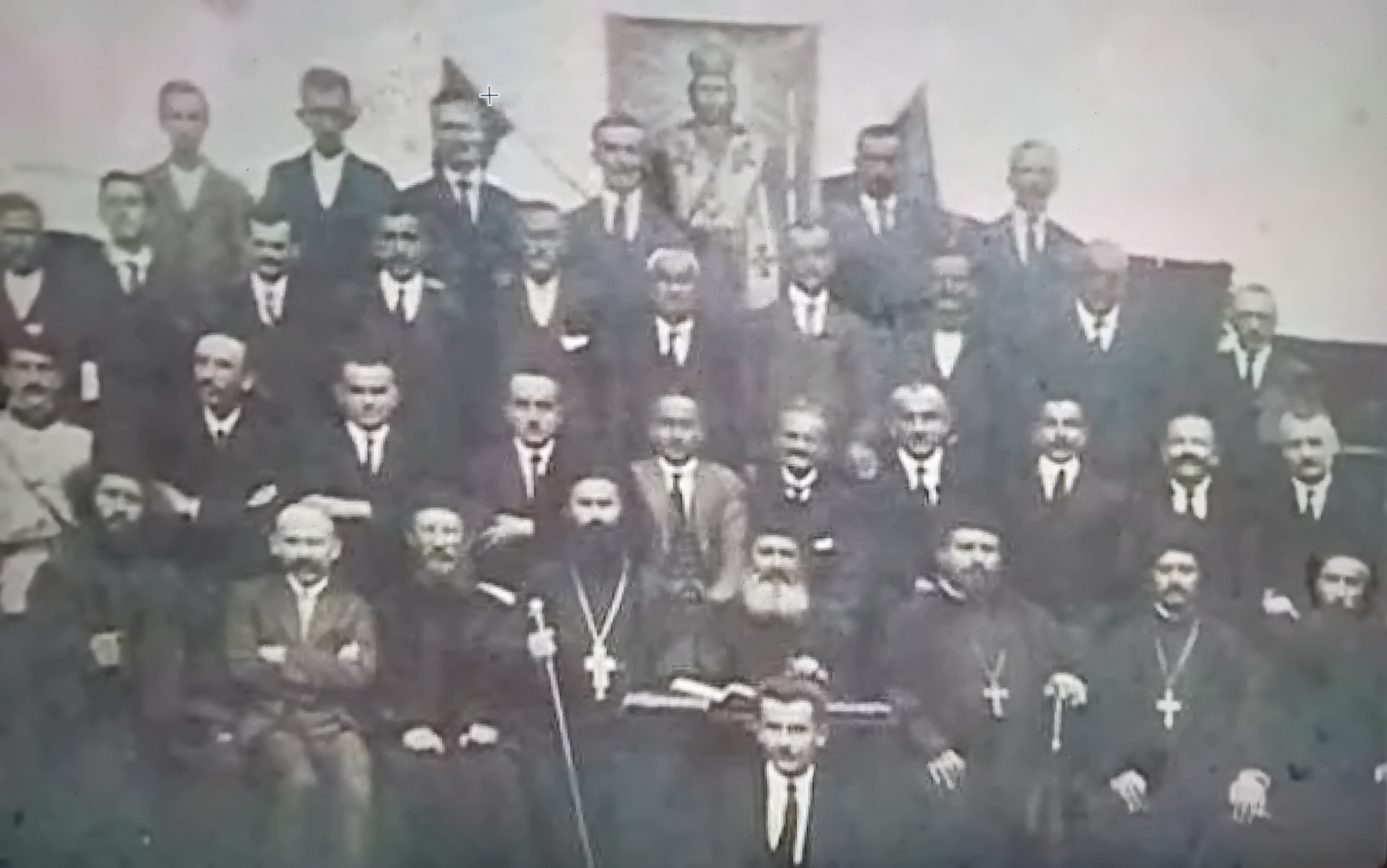
Delegates of the Albanian Orthodox Autocephaly Congress Berat, 1922.

The Congress of Berat was held in September 11–13, 1922.

Llazar Bozo and Tun Gjergji were the delegates representing Lushnje in the Congress of Berat that declared the autocephaly of the Orthodox Church of Albania in September 1922.

Llazar Bozo was a signatory of the declaration of the autocephaly and of the first statute of the church composed of 14 articles.

=== Congress of Korça 1929 ===
The Congress of Korça (Albanian: Kongresi i dytë Kleriko-laik në qytetin e Korçës) was held on June 16–29, 1929 in Korçë, Albania.

Llazar Bozo was participant, signatory and the delegate representing Lushnja region in the Congress of Korça.

Llazar Bozo was member of the Special Commission (Albanian: Komisioni i Posaçëm) that gave the statute its final form. After 15 days of discussions at 7:30 on June 29, 1929, all delegates signed the documents to be approved as the final statute placing the Albanian Autocephalous Orthodox Church on a solid foundation.

Subsequently, the second ecclesiastical Congress of Korça reviewed the Regulations of the church.

The Autocephaly of the Orthodox Church of Albania was finally recognised in 1937 by the Ecumenical Patriarchate of Constantinople.

== Legacy ==
=== Places named in his honor ===
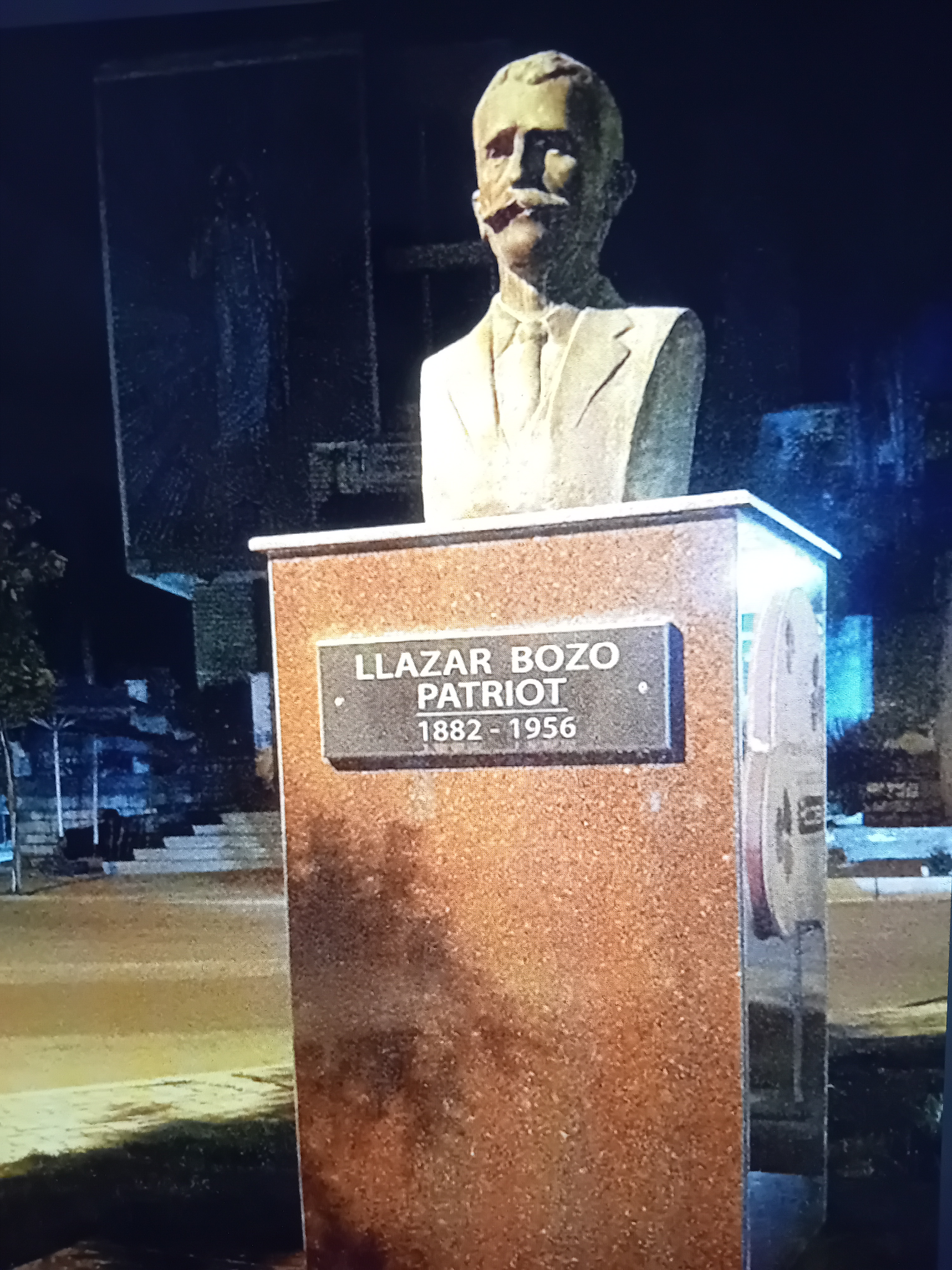

Llazar Bozo Promenade, (Albanian: Shetitorja Llazar Bozo), Kolonjë, Fier, Albania.

Llazar Bozo street, (Albanian: Rruga Llazar Bozo) Fier, Albania.

Llazar Bozo park and monument, Lushnjë, Albania.

=== Medals and orders ===
Citizen of Honor (Albanian: Qytetar nderi) of the city of Lushnje, Albania.

Order of the Flag (Albanian: Urdhëri i Flamurit)

Order of Bravery (Albanian: Urdhëri i Trimërisë)

Medal of Remembrance (Albanian: Medalja e Kujtimit)

=== Books - monographies ===
The author, writer and journalist Hilli Liko has written a monography “Kapedan Llazar Bozo”
