= Medal of Civil Merit =

Civil decoration of the Republic of Albania

- Native name: Medalja e Meritës Civile
- Type: State medal
- Awarded for: Acts of bravery, courage, sacrifice and selflessness performed within the territory of Albania.
- Country: Albania
- Presented by: President of Albania
- Eligibility: Albanian and foreign citizens
- Status: Currently constituted
- Established: 28 March 2024
- Ribbon bar

The Medal of Civil Merit (Albanian: Medalja e Meritës Civile; MMC) is a state decoration of Albania. It is awarded to Albanian and foreign citizens for acts of bravery, courage, sacrifice and selflessness performed within the territory of the Republic.

== History ==
The Medal of Civil Merit has no direct equivalent among the decorations historically awarded by the Albanian state. It is also unrelated to the "Decoration for Special Civil Merits", a separate award conferred under the system of state honors, in force from 2013 to 2025.

It is, however, closely related in structure to the Medal of Military Merit. The two decorations follow a similar phaleristic format, organization and system of grades, but differ mainly in the categories and professional backgrounds of the persons for whom they are intended.

== Award criteria ==
The Medal of Civil Merit may be awarded to both Albanian and foreign citizens for acts of bravery, courage, sacrifice and selflessness carried out within the territory of the Republic of Albania.

The medal may be conferred more than once upon the same person and in the same grade.

== Grades ==
The Medal of Civil Merit consists of three grades, arranged in descending order of precedence:

- Gold (Albanian: Medalja e Artë e Meritës Civile)
- Silver (Albanian: Medalja e Argjendtë e Meritës Civile)
- Bronze (Albanian: Medalja e Bronztë e Meritës Civile)

Holders of the Gold medal are included in the order of precedence at ceremonial events, in accordance with the rules governing the state ceremonial of the Republic of Albania.

== See also ==
- Orders, decorations, and medals of Albania
- Medal of Military Merit (Albania)
