= Order "40 Years of the Albanian Party of Labour" =

Order "40 Years of the Albanian Party of Labour" Urdhri "40 Vjetori i PPSH"

Awarded by Political Bureau of the Central Committee
- Type: State decoration
- Established: 4 May 1981
- Country: People's Socialist Republic of Albania
- Eligibility: Members of the Party of Labour of Albania
- Criteria: Long-standing service and contribution to the PPSH
- Status: Discontinued
- Classes: I
- Ribbon bar

The Order "40 Years of the Albanian Party of Labour" (Albanian: Urdhri "40 Vjetori i PPSH") was an Albanian state decoration instituted in 1981 to commemorate the 40th anniversary of the founding of the Party of Labour of Albania (PPSH).

Awarded to veteran party members associated with the National Liberation Movement during World War II, the order was regarded as a prestigious decoration since eligibility was restricted to a small number of politicians, with Enver Hoxha himself becoming a recipient on 16 September 1981.

The order was accompanied with a booklet from the Central Committee of the Party of Labour, which identified the recipient and documented the decision authorizing the award.

== Insignia ==
The badge consists of a five-pointed, gold-colored star centered on a red flag inscribed PPSH, the abbreviation for Partia e Punës e Shqipërisë ("Party of Labour of Albania"). Beneath the flag is a hammer and sickle set against the rays of a rising sun.

The design is framed by a silver-colored laurel wreath, with a small plaque at its base inscribed "40 VJETORI" (40th anniversary). The reverse is plain and smooth. The badge is suspended by a ring and connecting element from a rectangular suspension bar covered with a red ribbon.

Earlier examples featured a partially open wreath whose upper branches extended only as far as the horizontal points of the star. They displayed twelve sun rays beneath the flag rather than the eight found on later versions, bearing the abbreviated inscription 40 VJET on the lower plaque. Both silver-colored and gilt versions were produced, with at least four variants of the insignia documented.

== See also ==
- Orders, decorations, and medals of Albania
- Party of Labour of Albania
