= Order of the Red Star (disambiguation) =

The Order of the Red Star is a national award of many former communist states during the Cold War. They get their name from the original Soviet award of the same name:

- Order of the Red Star (Soviet Union)
- Order of the Red Star (Albania)
- Order of the Red Star (Czechoslovakia)
- Order of the Red Star (Bukharan People's Soviet Republic)

== See also ==
- Order of the Red Banner
