= National Flag Decoration =

Albanian civil decoration

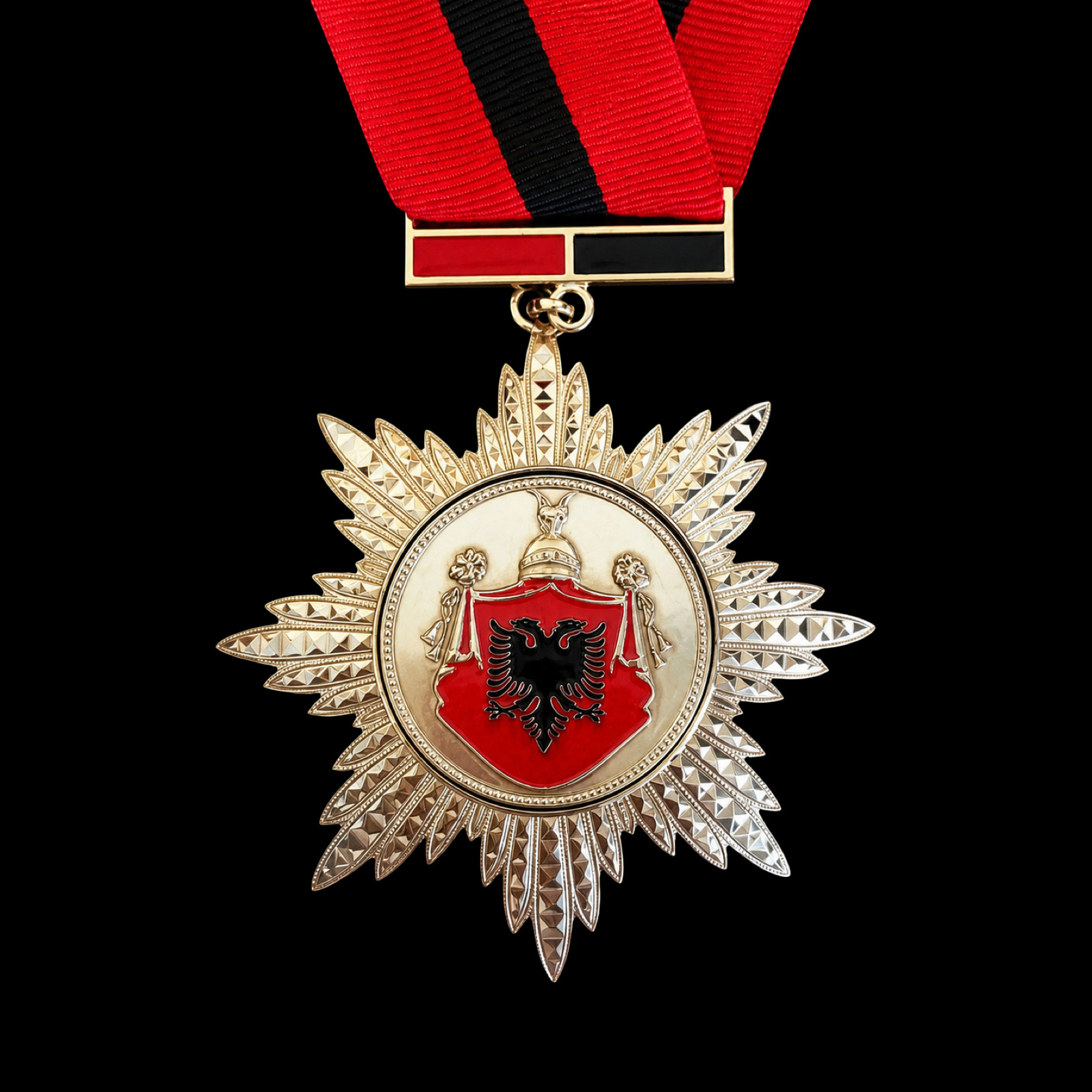

Awarded by the President of Albania
- Type: State decoration
- Eligibility: Albanians, Foreign nationals
- Awarded for: "As a token of gratitude and recognition for those who by their acts and good name contribute to honoring the Albanian nation."
- Status: Currently awarded
- His Excellency the President of Albania
- Chancellor: His Excellency the Minister of Foreign Affairs
- Ribbon bar

The National Flag Decoration (Albanian: Dekorata e Flamurit Kombëtar) is one of the highest decorations to be given in Albania, among the Civil awards and decorations of Albania, and was instituted by special law Nr.8113, of 28 March 1996.

This award is granted to Albanians or foreigners for extraordinary contributions for the sublimation of the Albanian nation and Albania.

Mostly the proposer of this Order is the President of the Republic through his own initiative. It could also be the Speaker of Assembly or the Prime Minister.

== Famous recipients of National Flag Order ==
Recipients:

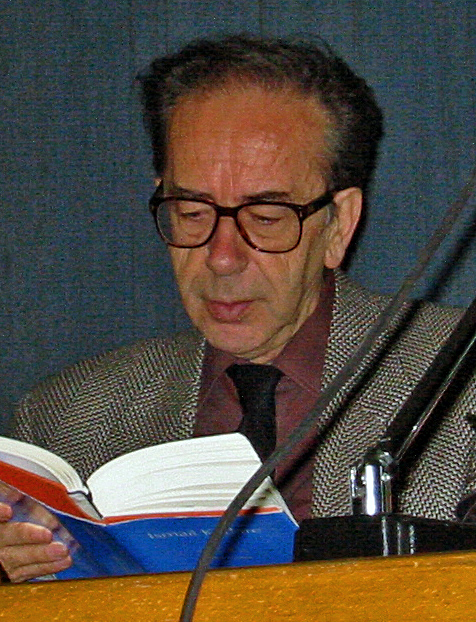
Ismail Kadare

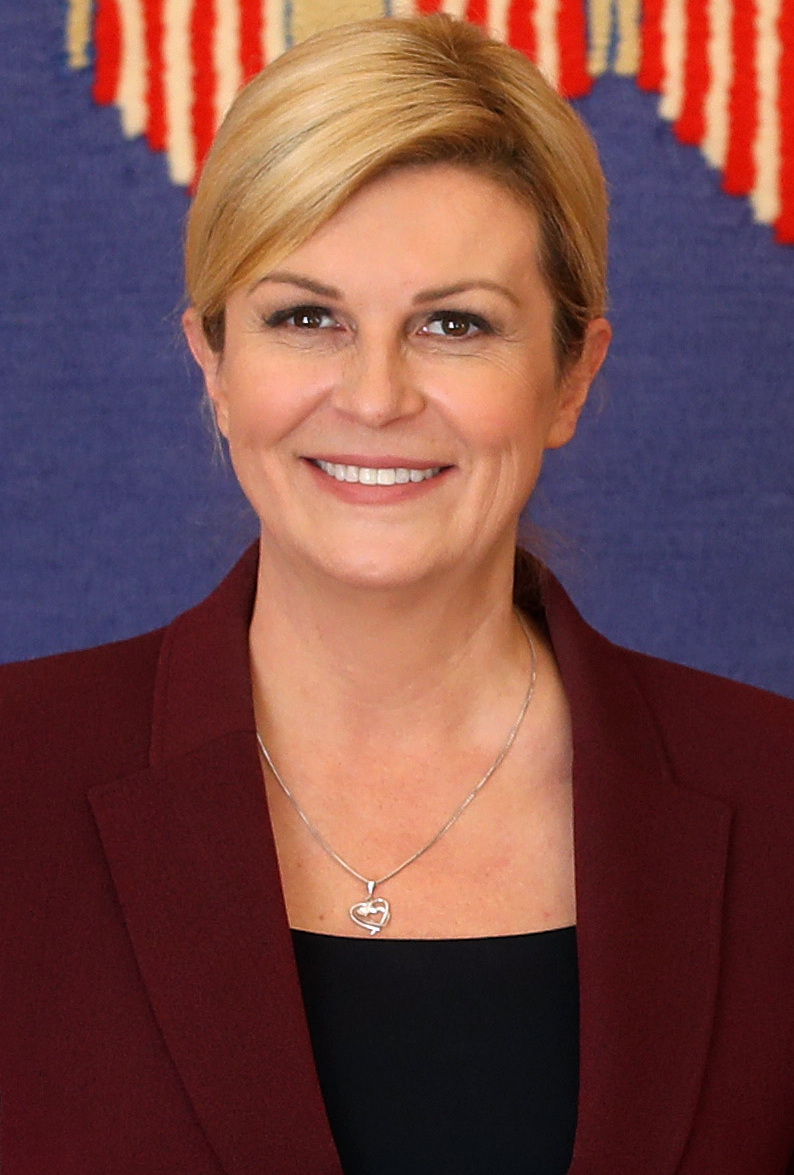
Kolinda Grabar-Kitarović

  - 2006 - Kosovo - First President of the partially recognised Republic of Kosova Ibrahim Rugova
  - 2007 - United States - 43rd President of the United States George W. Bush
  - 2012 - Kosovo - Founders of the Kosovo Liberation Army, National Hero of Kosovo Adem Jashari
  - 2012 - Kosovo - Kosovo Albanian activist Adem Demaçi
  - 2012 - United States - 67th United States Secretary of State Hillary Clinton
  - 2012 - Albania - Leader of Albania from 1925 to 1939 Zog I of Albania (posthumous)
  - 2013 - Kosovo - Kosovo Albanian freedom fighter Adem Jashari (posthumous)
  - 2014 - Austria - Austrian politician Heinz Fischer
  - 2014 - UK - 4th Baron of the Rothschild family Jacob Rothschild
  - 2015 - Portugal - Portuguese politician who was the 11th President of the European Commission José Manuel Barroso
  - 2015 - Sovereign Military Order of Malta - 79th Prince and Grand Master of the Sovereign Military Order of Malta Matthew Festing
  - 2015 - Qatar - Former ruling Emir of the State of Qatar Hamad bin Khalifa Al Thani
  - 2015 - Turkey - Former Prime Minister of the Republic of Turkey Recep Tayyip Erdoğan
  - 2015 - Albania - Former President and Prime Minister of Albania Sali Berisha
  - 2016 - Albania - Albanian novelist and poet Ismail Kadare
  - 2016 - Montenegro - Milo Đukanović
  - 2016 - Finland - Martti Ahtisaari
  - 2017 - United States - former United States senator Bob Dole
  - 2017 - Albania - Shaban Polluzha
  - 2017 - Germany - Franz Josef Strauss
  - 2018 - Croatia - Kolinda Grabar-Kitarović
  - 2018 - Monaco - Albert II, Prince of Monaco
  - 2018 - Croatia - Stjepan Mesić
  - 2019 - Albania - Mujo Ulqinaku (post mortem)

== See also ==
- Orders, decorations and medals of Albania
