= Order of the Partisan Star =

The Order of the Partisan Star is a national award of former socialist nations, which was awarded to military and civilian personnel during wartime and peacetime operations.

- Order of the Partisan Star (Albania)
- Order of the Partisan Star (Yugoslavia)
