= Medal of Public Gratitude =

Honorary decoration of the Republic of Albania

- Grand Cordon with the Star
- Native name: Medalja për Mirënjohje Publike
- Type: Medal
- Awarded for: Distinguished contributions in service to the Albanian state and the strengthening of democratic society domestically and abroad.
- Country: Albania
- Presented by: the Prime Minister of Albania
- Eligibility: Albanians, foreign citizens.
- Status: Currently constituted
- Established: 29 May 2019
- Ribbon bar

The Medal of Public Gratitude (Albanian: Medalja për Mirënjohje Publike; MMP) is an Albanian state decoration awarded by the Prime Minister of Albania for outstanding contributions in service to the Albanian state and the strengthening of democratic society domestically and abroad. The medal is divided into three classes, distinguished by the insignia awarded to the recipient.

== History ==
The Medal of Public Gratitude predates the current system of classes and insignia. In 2019, the Council of Ministers adopted Decision No. 355 of 29 May 2019, establishing specifications for medals of public recognition and professional merit.

Pursuant to Law No. 112/2013 "On decorations, honorary titles, medals and local honorary titles in the Republic of Albania", the new decoration was organized into three classes, each with their own insignia.

Influenced by Western European traditions of state honors, its design featured as a central motiff a 36-pointed star, derived from the official emblem used to celebrate the Year of Skanderbeg, a nationwide commemorative event which coincided with the 550th anniversary of the death of Albanian national hero, Skanderbeg.

== Grades ==
The Medal of Public Gratitude consists of three grades, arranged in descending order of precedence:

- Gold Medal (Albanian: Kordoni i Madh me Yll)
- Silver Medal (Albanian: Ylli i Madh)
- Bronze Medal (Albanian: Ylli)

== Insignia ==
Insignia	Description
	Grand Cordon with Star of Public Gratitude; The Grand Cordon with Star of Public Gratitude consists of a Grand Cordon with a badge and a breast star. The cordon is 100 mm wide and black with a 12 mm central red stripe. The cordon badge features a 36-pointed star measuring 70 × 59 × 2.5 mm, centered with a relief double-headed eagle of Gjergj Kastrioti Skanderbeg. It is suspended from a hinged oak-and-laurel wreath measuring 28 × 28 mm. The accompanying breast star measures 90 × 76 × 2.7 mm and bears a larger version of the same eagle. Both insignia are made of gold-plated bronze with an intermediate palladium layer, with red enamel on the central field and green enamel on the wreath. The reverse bears the inscription "Benemerenti" and may include the manufacturer's logo.
	Grand Star of Public Gratitude; The Grand Star of Public Gratitude consists of a neck badge and breast star. The 36-pointed neck badge, measuring 60 × 51 × 2 mm, bears a relief double-headed eagle of Gjergj Kastrioti Skanderbeg and is suspended from a 26 mm oak-and-laurel wreath. It is worn from an adjustable 50 mm-wide black ribbon with a central 8 mm red stripe. The accompanying breast star measures 80 × 68 × 2.6 mm and bears a larger relief double-headed eagle at its center. Both insignia are made of gold-plated bronze with enameled details and a protective lacquer coating.
	Star of Public Gratitude; The Star of Public Gratitude consists of a 36-pointed star measuring 50 × 43 × 2 mm, with a relief double-headed eagle of Gjergj Kastrioti Skanderbeg measuring 22 × 20.5 × 2 mm at its center. The star is hinged to a 25 × 25 mm oak-and-laurel wreath, which is attached to an ornamental clasp. The badge is worn from an adjustable 30 mm-wide, 85 cm-long black silk ribbon with a central 4 mm red stripe. It is made of bronze plated with 1000/1000 gold over a palladium layer, with red enamel on the star and green enamel on the wreath. A protective lacquer coating prevents oxidation.

== Revocation and suspension ==
The medal is withdrawn from a recipient when they have received a final judicial conviction for a serious criminal offence, or have been issued a final sentence of one year or more of unconditional imprisonment.

It may also be revoked or suspended indefinitely when the recipient has been convicted of an offence considered to compromise their reputation, integrity and moral standing, or to undermine their credibility in relation to others.

When a medal is revoked, the former recipient is required to return its insignia to the relevant authorities.

== Notable recipients ==
=== Grand Cordon with Star of Public Gratitude ===
- Donald Tusk – President of the European Council (2019)
- Angela Merkel – Chancellor of Germany (2021)
- Rexhep Qosja – Albanian writer and academic (2021)
- Pietro Parolin – Cardinal Secretary of State of the Holy See (2021)
- Luiza Gega – Albanian athlete (2022)
- Florian Marku – Albanian boxer (2022)
- Bill Clinton – 42nd President of the United States (2023)
- Mohamed bin Zayed Al Nahyan – President of the United Arab Emirates (2025)
- François Hollande – former President of France (2026)

=== Grand Star of Public Gratitude ===
- Charles John Brown – Apostolic Nuncio to Albania (2020)
- Abbas Ibrahim – Lebanese major general (2021)
- Tod D. Wolters – United States Air Force general and Supreme Allied Commander Europe (2022)
- Giuseppe Zafarana – Commander General of the Italian Guardia di Finanza (2022)
- Briken Calja – Albanian weightlifter (2023)
- Erkand Qerimaj – Albanian weightlifter (2023)
- Zelimkhan Abakarov – Albanian freestyle wrestler (2023)
- Frédéric Jousset – French businessman and founder of Art Explora (2025)
- Minoru Kiuchi – Japanese politician (2026)

=== Star of Public Gratitude ===
- Eklent Kaçi – Albanian pool player (2023)
- Lara Colturi – Albanian alpine skier (2023)
- Alban Beqiri – Albanian boxer (2023)
- Gentiana Beqa – Albanian bodybuilder (2023)
- Alvin Karaqi – Albanian karateka (2023)
- Agim Troci – Albanian police commissioner (2025)
- Gëzim Marku – Albanian Army colonel (2025)
- Ervin Buzi – Albanian Army lieutenant colonel (2025)
- Hubert Hasenauer – Austrian academic and rector of BOKU University (2025)

== See also ==
- Orders, decorations, and medals of Albania
- Prime Minister of Albania
