= Medal of Gratitude =

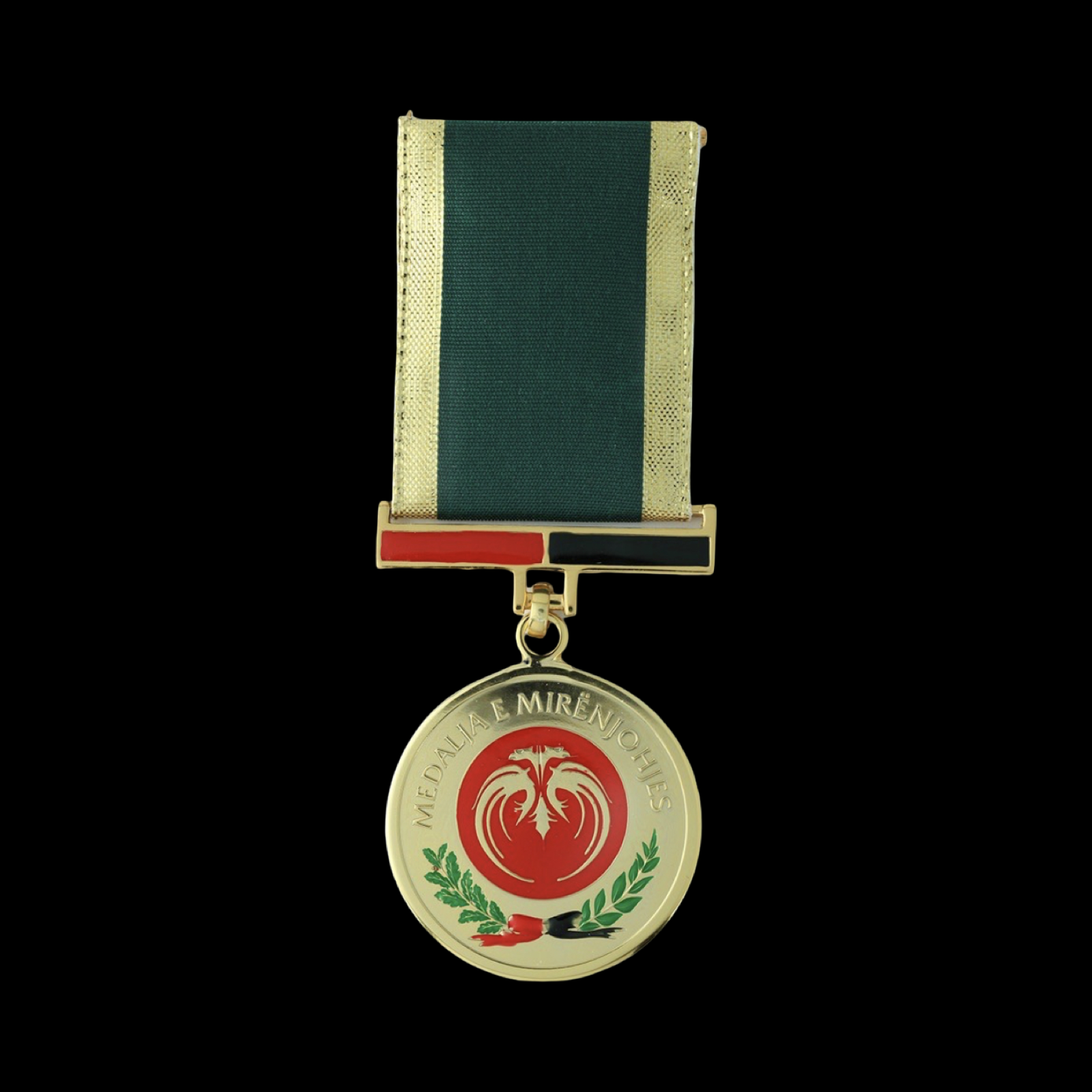
- Native name: Medalja e Mirënjohjes
- Type: State decoration
- Awarded for: As a token of gratitude and recognition to Albanians or foreigners during official celebrations or historical events.
- Country: Albania
- Presented by: the President of Albania
- Eligibility: Albanian and foreign citizens
- Status: Discontinued
- Established: 19 November 2002
- Ribbon bar

The Medal of Gratitude (Albanian: Medalja e Mirënjohjes) was an Albanian state decoration awarded to Albanian and foreign citizens on the occasion of official celebrations and historical events.

The decoration was discontinued on 4 April 2013, when Law No. 112/2013 reorganised Albania’s system of state honors and repealed the legislation under which it had been established.

A separate military medal bearing the same name would subsequently be awarded by the Minister of Defence.

== History ==
The Medal of Gratitude was instituted in 2002 through an amendment to Law No. 8113 of 28 March 1996, "On Decorations in the Republic of Albania". The amendment added the medal to the decorations recognised under Article 3 and introduced a new Article 14/2 defining its purpose and eligibility.

The law was promulgated by President Alfred Moisiu under Decree No. 3566 of 19 November 2002 and took effect 15 days after its publication in Fletorja Zyrtare.

== Insignia ==
The decoration takes the form of a circular gold badge with a red central medallion bearing a stylized gold double-headed eagle. An ornamental scroll above the medallion is inscribed "Medalja e Mirënjohjes", while two laurel branches decorate the lower part. The badge is suspended from a green-and-gold ribbon.

== Notable recipients ==
- Maria De Filippi (2005)
- Klubi i Shkrimtarëve Shqiptarë në Botë "Drita" (2005)
- Evelina Qirjako (2006)
- Agim Nesho (2006)
- Arben Cici (2006)
- Skënder Breca (2008)
- Carlo Bollino (2009)
- Nikollë Lesi (2009)
- Evanthi Ciko (2010)
- Ahmed Shaheed (2010)
- City of Bari (2011)
- Gëzim Peshkëpia (2011)
- Pietro Mennea
- Warren L. Miller
- Deborah Wagner
- Ramón Sánchez Lizarralde
- Karsten Ankjær Jensen
- Florian Raunig
- Nine United States servicemen killed in a C-130 aircraft crash
- Richard Gere (2012)
- Dom Prekë Ndrevashaj (2012)
- Ruggero Valentini (2012)
- Peter Bartl (2012)
- Cynthia Aldridge (2012)
- Artan Lame (2012)
- Italian Civil Aviation Authority (2013)
- James G. Stavridis (2013)
- Recai Akyel (2013)
- Robert Austin (2013)
- Robert Elsie (2013)
- Igor Šoltes (2013)

== See also ==
- Orders, decorations, and medals of Albania
