= Golden Decoration of the Eagle =

Albanian honorary decoration

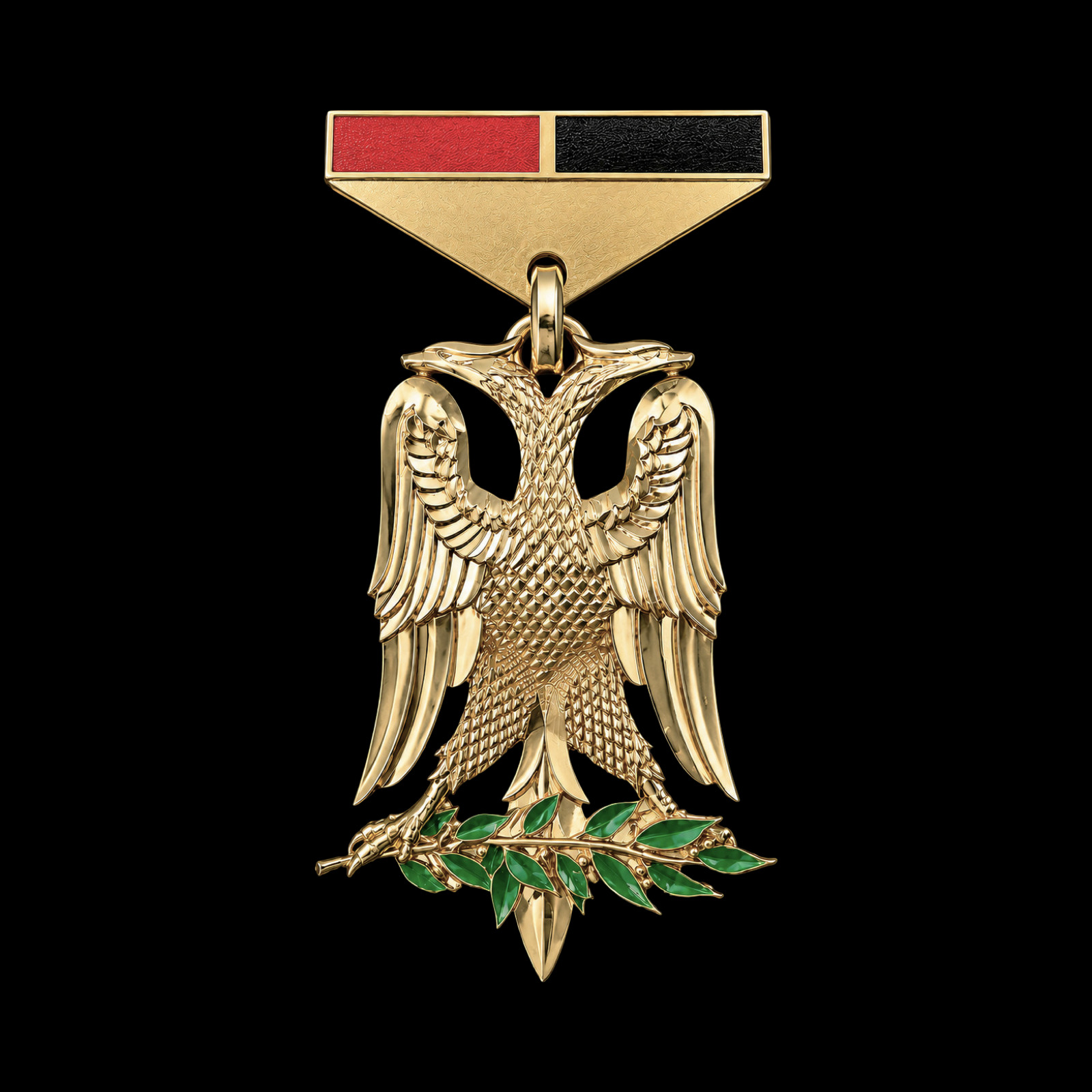

Awarded by President of Albania
- Type: State decoration
- Established: 28 March 1996
- Country: Republic of Albania
- Criteria: Awarded to Albanian and foreign citizens for bravery in armed war and for activities or acts of civic courage in peacetime.
- Classes: Golden

The Golden Decoration of the Eagle (Albanian: Dekorata e Artë e Shqiponjës) (formerly known as the Golden Medal of the Eagle) is an honorary decoration of the Republic of Albania given to Albanian and foreign citizens for bravery in armed war and for activities or acts of civic courage in peacetime. The decoration is awarded by decree of the President of the Republic. This order is golden.

== Recipients ==
- Sylvinho, Brazilian manager of Albania national football team (2023)

== See also ==
- Orders, decorations and medals of Albania
