= Torchbearer of Democracy Medal =

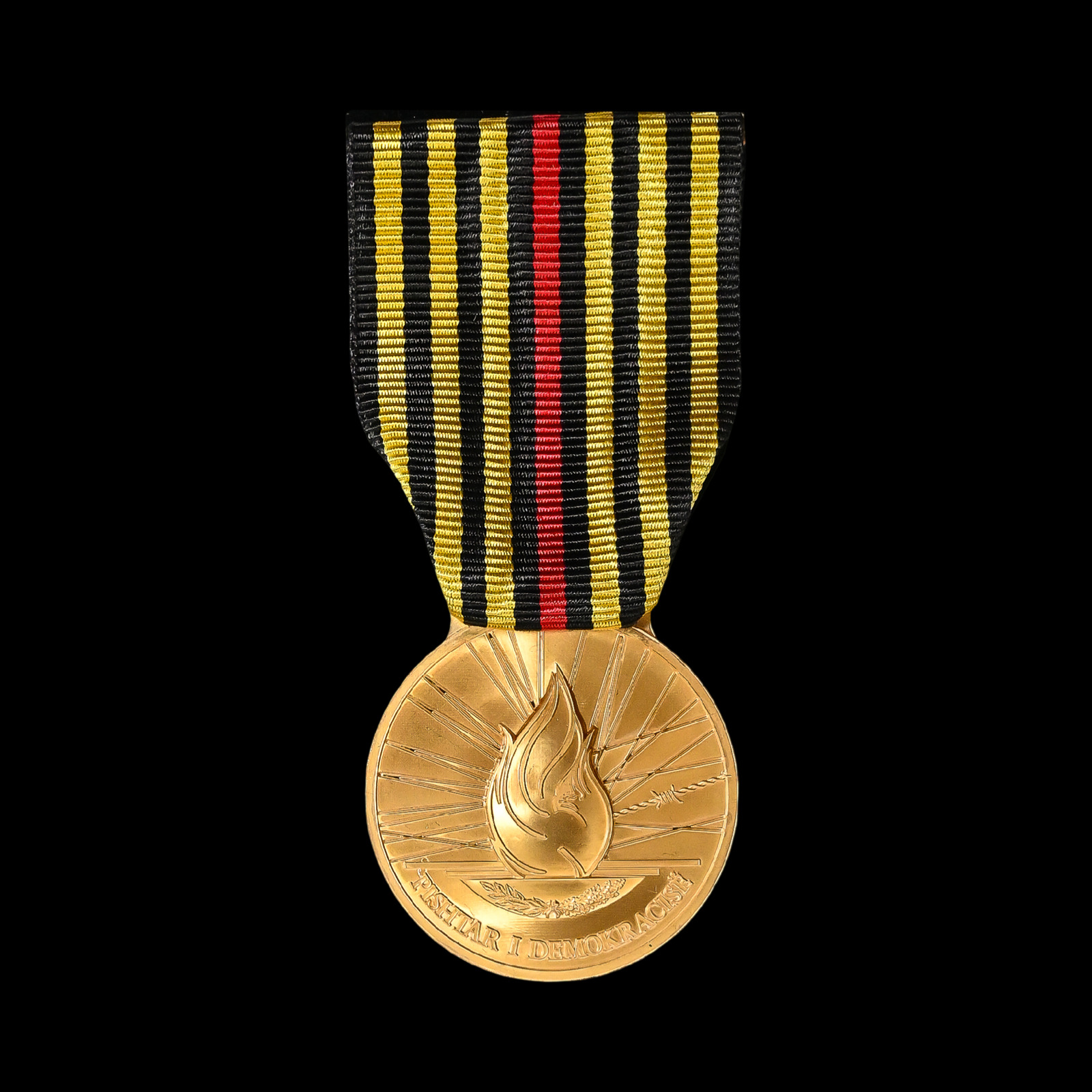
- Native name: Medalja "Pishtar i Demokracisë"
- Type: Service medal
- Awarded for: Individuals who experienced political or religious persecution
- Country: Albania
- Presented by: President of the Republic
- Status: Currently constituted
- Established: 7 July 1992
- Ribbon bar

The Torchbearer of Democracy Medal (Albanian: Medalja "Pishtar i Demokracisë"; MPD) is an Albanian state medal awarded to individuals who experienced political or religious persecution under the country's communist regime. The medal derives from an earlier decoration bearing the same name and purpose, but was later reintroduced with a revised design.

== History ==
The decoration was established by Law No. 7580 of 7 July 1992 as the Gold Medal “Torchbearer of Democracy”. It was intended for Albanian citizens, individuals of Albanian descent and patriotic organisations for their distinguished service and for having made patriotic sacrifices in advancing the ideals of the Albanian nation and democracy.

The law took immediate effect and was subsequently promulgated by President Sali Berisha through Decree No. 247 of 11 July 1992.

== Award criteria ==
The medal may be conferred on Albanian and foreign citizens who were directly subjected to political or religious persecution under the communist regime between 29 November 1944 and 31 April 1991.

It is issued as a single class and is the only Albanian state decoration that may be awarded posthumously without restriction.

== Insignia ==
The decoration consists of a circular gold-colored medal featuring an eternal flame at its center, rising from an ornamental base of laurel leaves. The background combines radiating rays with strands of barbed wire, symbolizing the repression and persecution by communist authorities.

The medal, 35 mm in diameter, hangs from a black ribbon marked by groups of three gold stripes and a central red stripe. Its colors represent the suffering and mourning caused by the dictatorship, while the red stripe symbolizes the blood shed by those persecuted between 1945 and 1991.

On the reverse, a blank space is provided for engraving the recipient's name and the date on which the medal was awarded.

== Notable recipients ==
- Pjetër Arbnori
- Azem Hajdari
- Pandeli Majko
- Adem Gjurra
- Arben Sulo
- Rexhep Rrugëja
- Kolec Ndoja
- Dritan Kanapari
- Astrit Hatellari
- Ardian Elezi
- Dedë Kasneci
- Gjergj Beka
- Rini Monajka (posthumously)
- Tonin Dema
- Nikolin Thana
- Gjovalin Rrolba
- Ndoc Lëqëjza (posthumously)
- Flamur Begu (posthumously)
- Kolë Margjini
- Klaudo Daka
- Aldo Perizi
- Kolec Hublina
- Viktor Martini
- Pjerin Veli
- Gjovalin Zefi (posthumously)
- Pranvera Bodinaku
- Hatixhe Boriçi
- Nevruz Kaptelli
- Koço Jani
- Myftar Ismalaja
- Pal Deda
- The 49 participants in the Valias miners' hunger strike of May 1991
- Grupimi Dhjetori '90

== See also ==
- Chancellery of Orders and Medals of the Republic
- Orders, decorations, and medals of Albania
