= Order of the Flag =

Albanian state decoration

Order of the Flag Urdhri i Flamurit
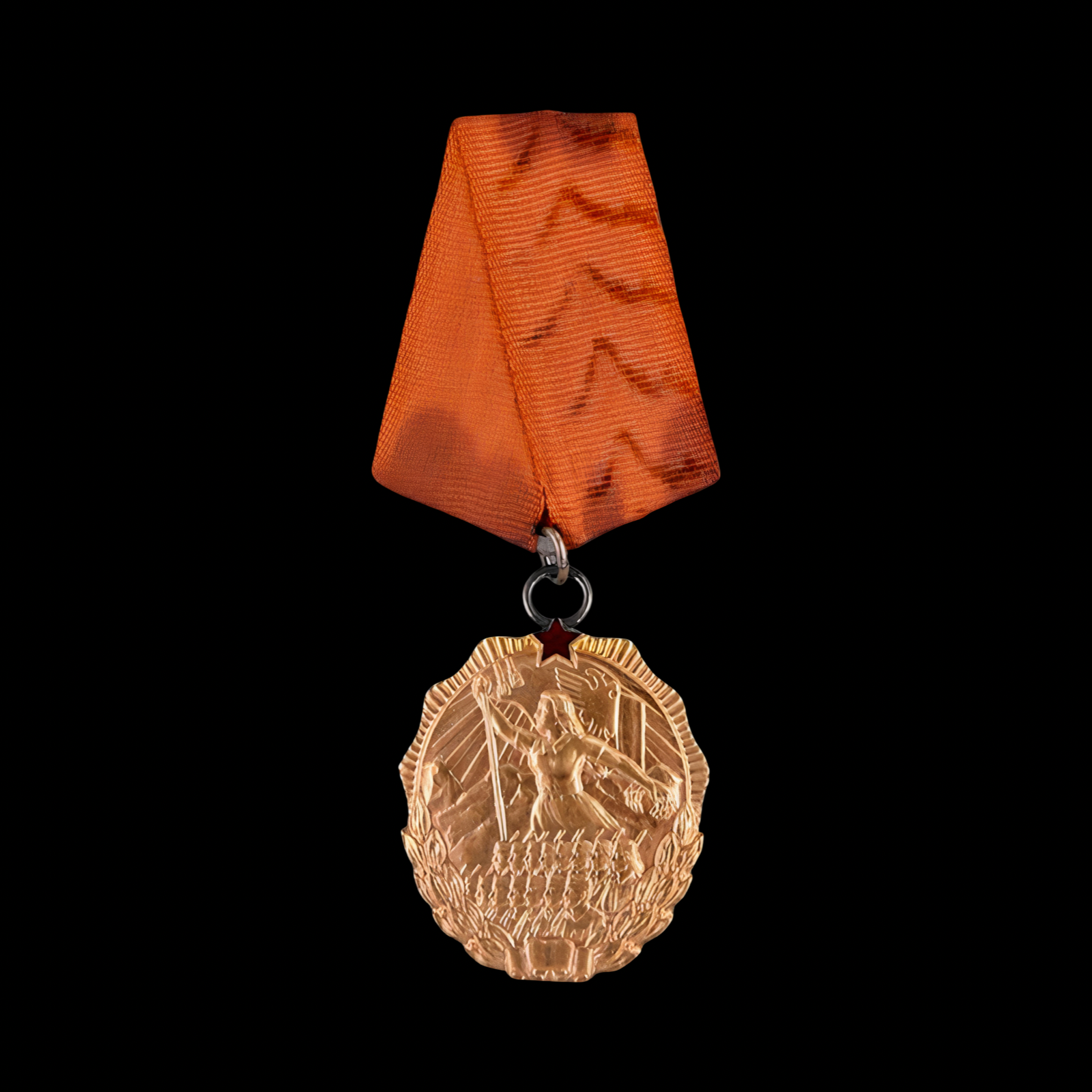

Awarded by The Presidium of the People's Assembly
- Type: State decoration
- Established: 9 July 1945
- Country: People's Socialist Republic of Albania
- Criteria: Awarded to citizens, collectives, factories, administrative divisions, institutions and organizations that performed outstanding achievements in production, agriculture, science, and inventions.
- Status: Abolished
- Classes: Class I
- Ribbon bar

The Order of the Flag (Albanian: Urdhri i Flamurit) was an honorary award given to citizens, collectives, factories, administrative divisions, institutions and organizations in the People's Socialist Republic of Albania.

== Definition ==
The order was given to citizens, districts, cities, villages, social organizations, institutions, enterprises, agricultural cooperatives, sectors, brigades, military units and groups of employees for activities and great merits in the socialist construction of the country and in strengthening the capacity to defend the Fatherland, for high quantitative and qualitative achievements in industry, mining, agriculture, construction, transport, etc.. and for high merits in the field of science, education, art and culture.

== See also ==
- Orders, decorations and medals of Albania
