= Robert Elsie =

Canadian/German linguist and Albanologist (1950–2017)

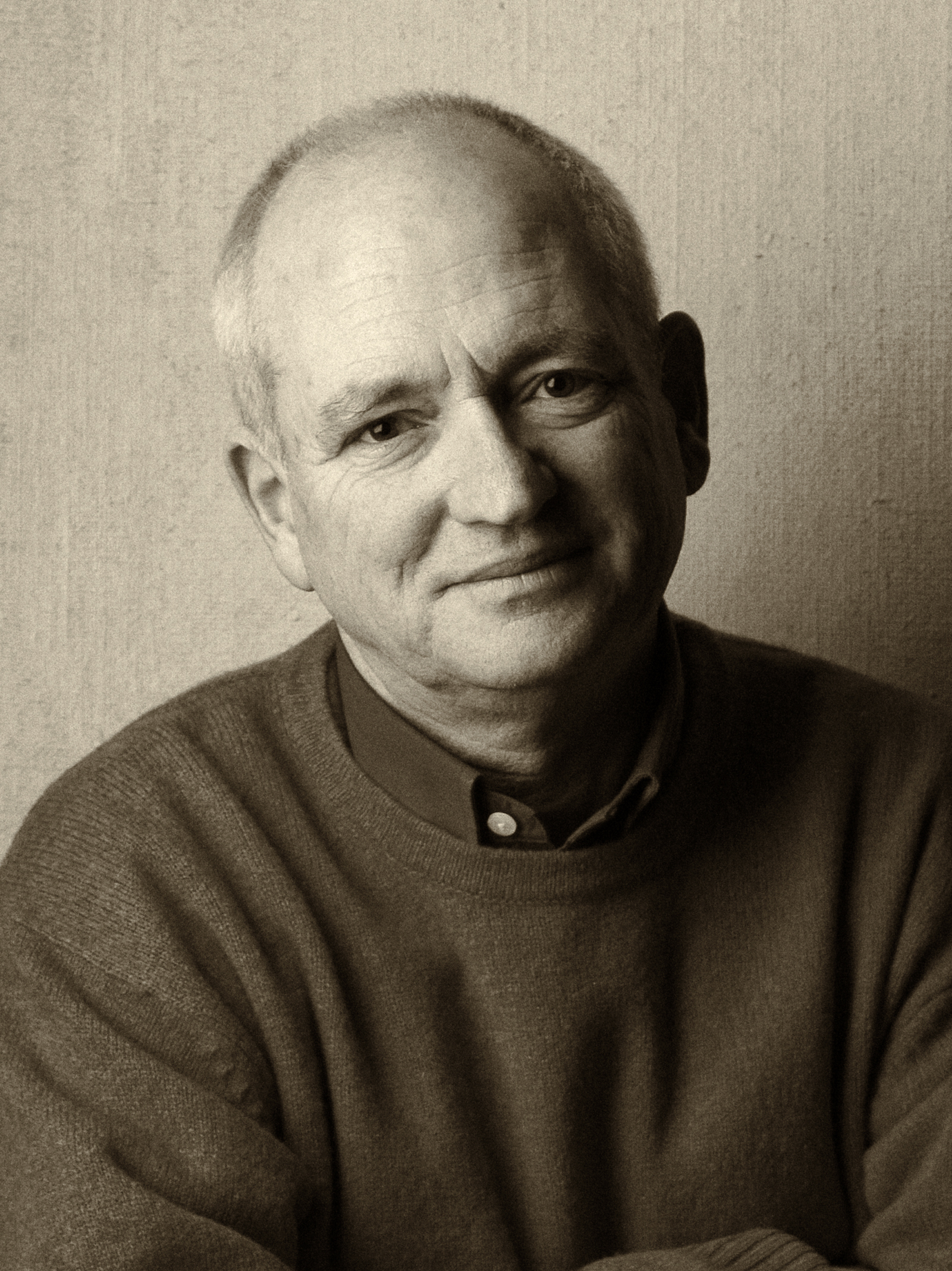
- Born: June 29, 1950; Vancouver, British Columbia, Canada
- Died: October 2, 2017 (aged 67); Berlin, Germany
- Resting place: Theth, Albania
- Awards: Albanian Medal of Gratitude

Academic work
- Main interests: Albanian history, culture
- Notable works: Albanian Literature : A Short History; The Highland Lute (Lahuta e Malcís): The Albanian National Epic.

Robert Elsie (June 29, 1950 – October 2, 2017) was a Canadian-born German scholar who specialized in Albanian literature and folklore.

Elsie was a writer, translator, interpreter, and specialist in Albanian studies, being the author of numerous books and articles that focused on various aspects of Albanian culture and affairs.

== Life ==
Elsie was born on June 29, 1950, in Vancouver, British Columbia, Canada. He studied at the University of British Columbia, graduating in 1972 with a diploma in Classical Studies and Linguistics. In the following years, he continued his post-graduate studies at the Free University of Berlin, at the École Pratique des Hautes Études and at the University of Paris IV: Paris-Sorbonne, at the Dublin Institute for Advanced Studies, and at the University of Bonn, where he finished his doctorate on Linguistics and Celtic Studies in 1978 at the Linguistics Institute.

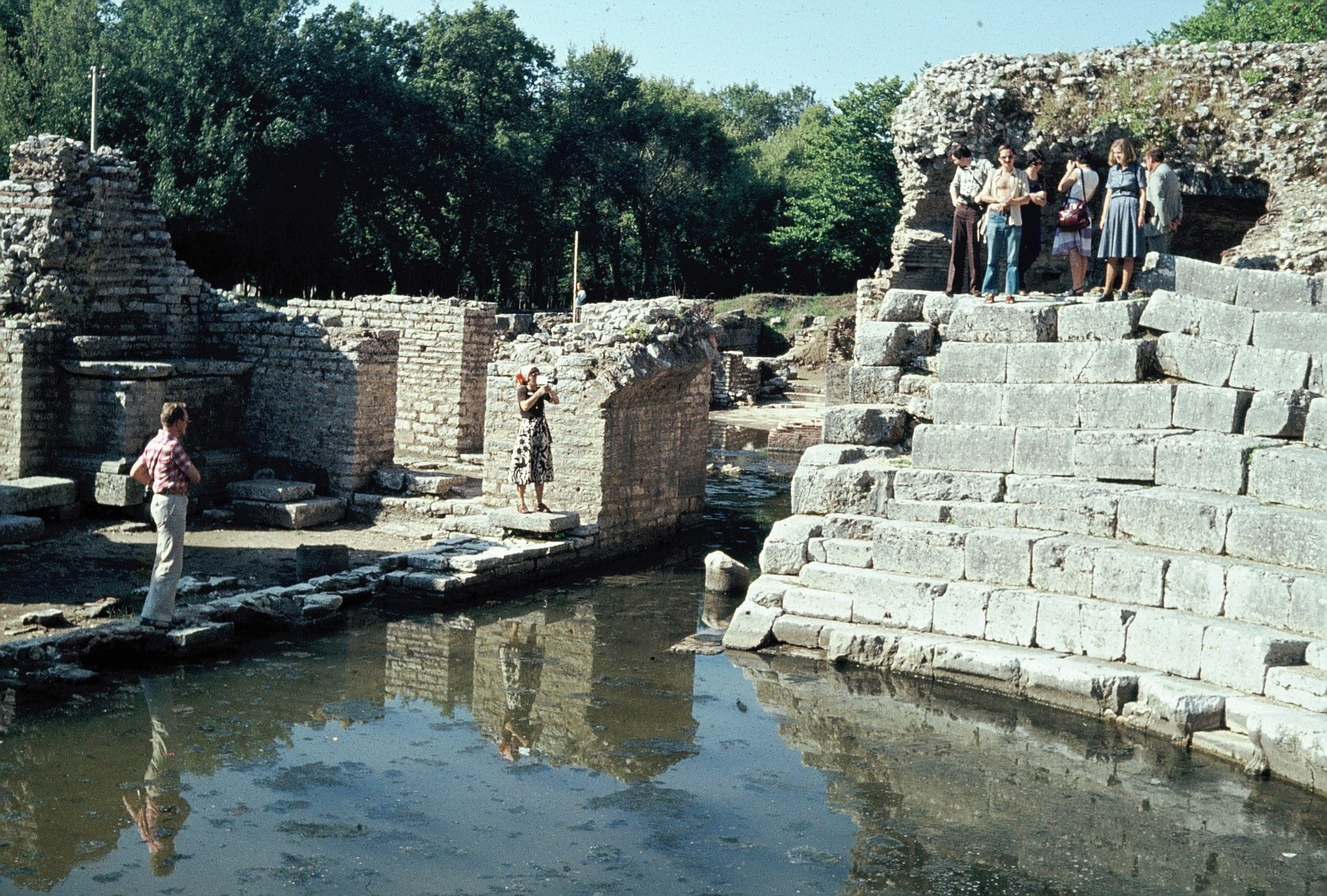
Robert Elsie (top right in blue pants and with mustache) in Butrint, 1978

From 1978 on, Elsie visited Albania several times with a group of students and professors from the University of Bonn. For several years, he also attended the International Seminar on Albanian Language, Literature and Culture (Seminari Ndërkombëtar për Gjuhën, Letërsinë dhe Kulturën Shqiptare), held in Pristina, Kosovo. From 1982 to 1987, he worked for the German Ministry of Foreign Affairs in Bonn, and from 2002 to 2013 for the International Criminal Tribunal for the former Yugoslavia in The Hague, in particular as an interpreter for several noted cases including the trial of Slobodan Milošević.

Elsie's scholarly travels and interest in Albanian dialects brought him into contact with Albanians from Albania, Kosovo, Greece, Montenegro, Italy, Croatia, Bulgaria, Ukraine, Macedonia, and Turkey and made dozens of recordings of the Albanian language.

As a translator Robert Elsie offered the reader "a selection of songs from the best known cycle of Albanian epic verse".

Elsie during his lifetime authored many works of scholarship and had no major unpublished work left for completion prior to his death.

== Death ==
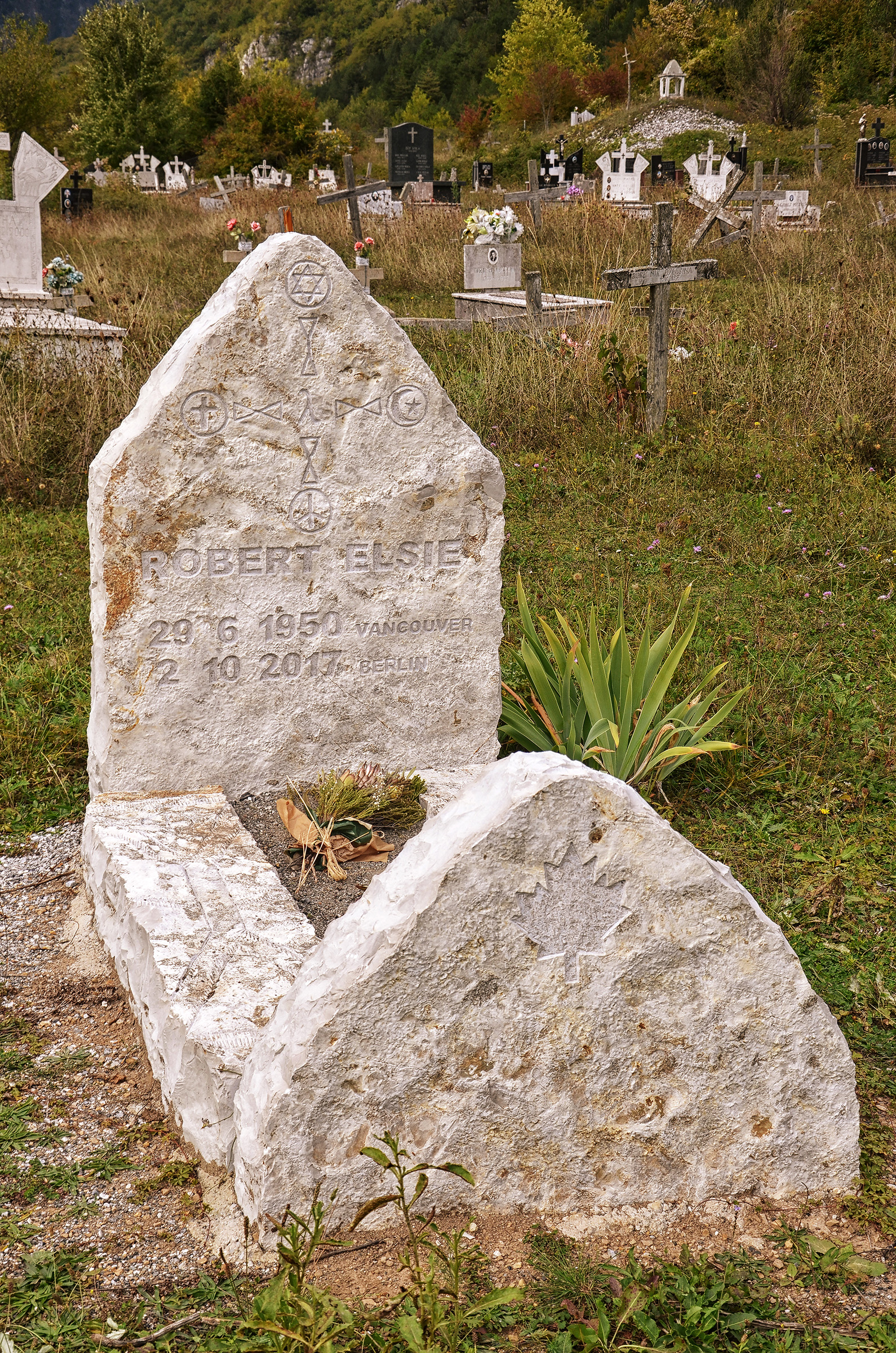
Grave site of Robert Elsie in Theth cemetery

On October 2, 2017, Elsie died of motor neuron disease in Berlin, Germany. His last words before dying were, "Death is so boring. So slow. One only waits for it". At the time of Elsie's death, it was initially reported in the media that he had requested in his will to be buried in Albania, although it emerged two weeks after those events that Elsie did not specify in his will where to be buried. Instead it was the decision of his life partner, Stephan Trierweiler, that he should be buried in Albania due to the deep love Elsie had for the country.

Elsie's coffin was brought to Albania to lay in repose at the National Library in Tirana for people to come and pay their respects. A farewell ceremony paying tribute to Elsie was held in Tirana, bringing together friends, academics and politicians from Albania, Kosovo and North Macedonia. During his lifetime, Elsie developed a fondness for Theth, seeing it as an Albanian "Shangri-La". On October 18, he was buried in that northern village located in the Albanian Alps. A prolific author of scholarly works, Elsie's untimely death within the context of Albanian studies has been seen as a "big blow" for its international promotion.

== Publications ==
Below are a selection of his publications of which he was an author, editor or translator. Elsie published around 60 books in English, Albanian or German.

- Robert Elsie, Baron Franz Nopcsa and his contribution to Albanian studies.
- Robert Elsie (2001). The Dictionary of Albanian Religion, Mythology and Folk Culture. Hurst & Co Ltd. ISBN 978-1850655701.
- Robert Elsie, ed. (2006). Balkan Beauty, Balkan Blood : Modern Albanian Short Stories (Writings from an Unbound Europe). Northwestern University Press. ISBN 0-8101-2336-3.
- Robert Elsie (2006). Albanian Literature: A Short History. I. B. Tauris. ISBN 1-84511-031-5.
- Robert Elsie and Janice Mathie-Heck, ed. (2004). Songs of the Frontier Warriors: Kenge Kreshnikesh--Albanian Epic Verse in a Bilingual English-Albanian Edition. Bolchazy-Carducci Publishers; Bilingual edition. ISBN 0-86516-412-6.
- Visar Zhiti [in Albanian] (2004). The Condemned Apple : Selected Poetry. Translated by Robert Elsie. Green Integer; Bilingual edition. ISBN 1-931243-72-7.
- Robert Elsie (2011). Historical Dictionary of Kosovo. Historical Dictionaries of Europe. Vol. 79. Scarecrow Press. ISBN 978-0-8108-7231-8.
- Robert Elsie (2010). Historical Dictionary of Albania. Historical Dictionaries of Europe. Vol. 75. Scarecrow Press. ISBN 978-0-8108-6188-6.
- Robert Elsie (2013). Leo Freundlich: Die Albanische Korrespondenz, Agenturmeldungen aus Krisenzeiten. Oldenburg Verlag. ISBN 978-3-486-70716-8.
- Robert Elsie (2013). Biographical Dictionary of Albanian History. I. B. Tauris. ISBN 978-1-78076-431-3.
- Robert Elsie (2013). The Cham Albanians of Greece: A Documentary History. I. B. Tauris. ISBN 978-1-780760-00-1.
- Robert Elsie (2013). The Balkans Wars: British Consular reports from Macedonia in the Final Years of the Ottoman Empire. I. B. Tauris. ISBN 978-1-780760-76-6.
- Robert Elsie (2015). Gathering Clouds: The Roots of Ethnic Cleansing in Kosovo and Macedonia - Early Twentieth-Century Documents. CreateSpace Independent Publishing Platform. ISBN 978-1507882085.
- Robert Elsie (2015). The Tribes of Albania: History, Society and Culture. I.B.Tauris. ISBN 9780857739322.
- Robert Elsie (2016). Early Albanian Bible Translations in Todhri Script. CreateSpace Independent Publishing Platform. ISBN 978-1539703334.
- Robert Elsie and Bejtullah D. Destani, ed. (2018). Kosovo, A Documentary History: From the Balkan Wars to World War II. I. B. Tauris. ISBN 9781786733542.
- Robert Elsie (2019). The Albanian Bektashi: History and Culture of a Dervish Order in the Balkans. Bloomsbury Publishing. ISBN 9781788315715.

== Honours ==
- Medal of Gratitude (Albania, 15 May 2013) – decorated by President of Albania Bujar Nishani. Robert Elsie received the honor for his contributions as a scholar for over 35 years focusing and internationally promoting the "culture, language, literature and history of Albanians" alongside the "positive image of Albania in the world". Offering his gratitude, President Nishani referred to Elsie as "a good Albanian".
