= Order of the Red Star (Albania) =

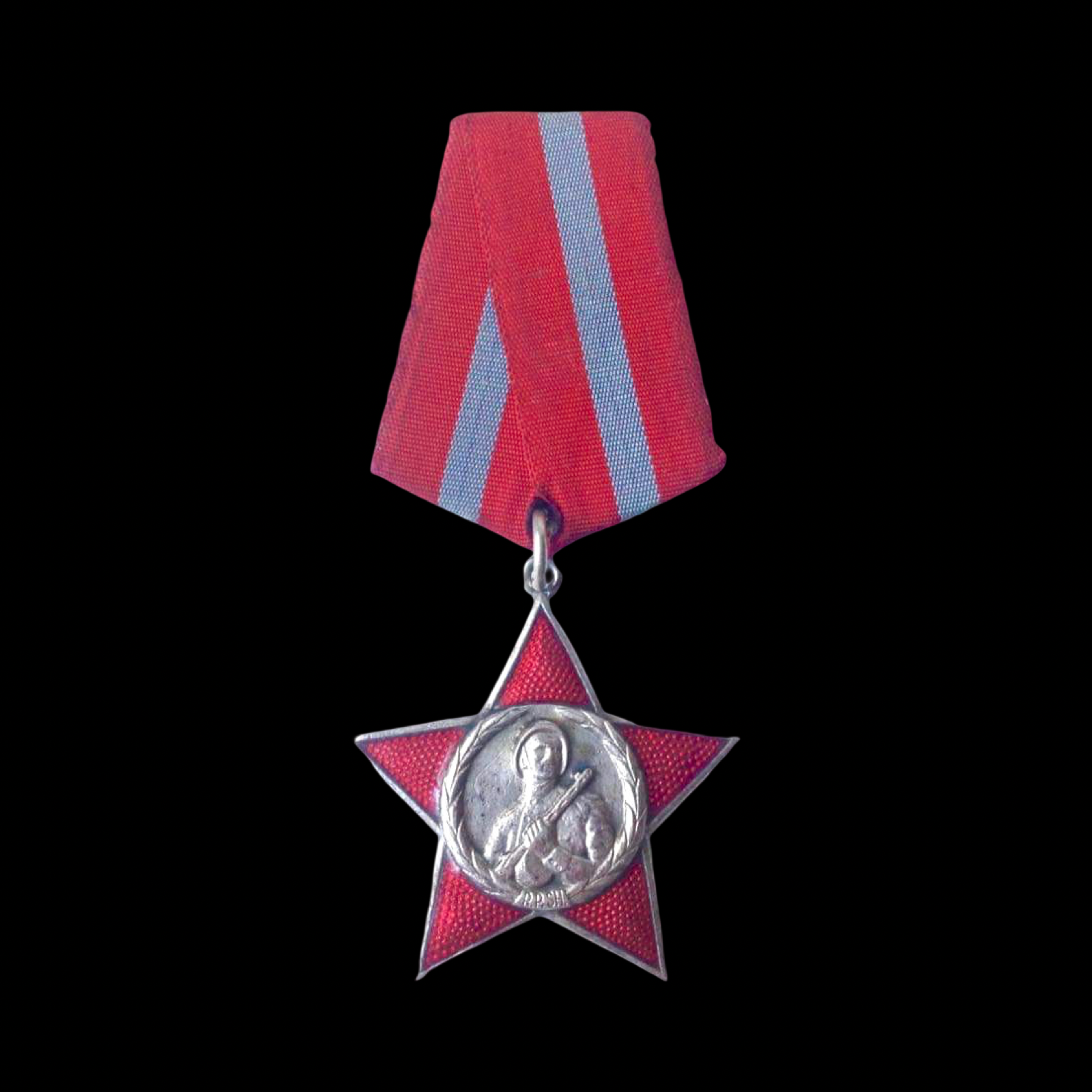
Order of the Red Star (second class)

The Order of the Red Star (Albanian: Urdhri "Ylli i Kuq") was an award of the People's Socialist Republic of Albania. It was awarded to officers, non-commissioned officers, pupils and students of military schools, soldiers, and reservists of the Albanian People's Army, as well as police officers, the Voluntary Forces of Popular Self-Defense, and armed school youth. It was awarded for good leadership in time of war and for very good achievements in the war against enemies of the people in peacetime.

Many recipients took part in the Liberation of Albania and the founding of the National Liberation Movement. It was established on November 20, 1952. On January 18, 1965, it was divided into three degrees.

In total there are three classes. The first class has a golden finish, second class a silver and the third a bronze. There was also a Medal of the Red Star.

== Recipients ==
- Enver Hoxha, First Secretary of the Party of Labour of Albania
- Alfred Moisiu, President of Albania

== See also ==
- Orders, decorations and medals of Albania
- Order of the Partisan Star (Albania)
