= Medal of Military Merit (Albania) =

Military decoration of the Republic of Albania

- Native name: Medalja e Meritës Ushtarake
- Type: Military medal
- Awarded for: Acts of selflessness, sacrifice, bravery and courage in connection with military duty.
- Country: Albania
- Presented by: President of Albania
- Eligibility: Members of the Albanian Armed Forces and, in exceptional cases, other persons.
- Status: Currently constituted
- Established: 28 March 2024
- Ribbon bar

The Medal of Military Merit (Albanian: Medalja e Meritës Ushtarake; MMU) is a military decoration of Albania. It is awarded primarily to members of the Albanian Armed Forces for acts of selflessness, sacrifice, bravery and courage performed in the course of, or as a consequence of, their duties in either peacetime or wartime.

In exceptional circumstances, it may also be conferred on other persons for acts carried out in defence of the country's territorial integrity.

== History ==
The Medal of Military Merit can trace its origins in Albania's earlier system of military decorations. During the reign of Zog I, acts of bravery and military merit were recognised through the Trim (Brave) grade of the Military Order of Bravery and its associated Medal, which was separated into three classes.

The present medal retains elements of the pre-war design while adapting defining features related to the modern Albanian state. The portrait of King Zog appearing on the earlier insignia was replaced by the double-headed eagle in relief. The medal also drew inspiration from comparable European decorations for military valor, most notably Italy's Medaglia al valor militare, France's Médaille militaire and the British Victoria Cross.

== Award criteria ==
The medal is awarded to members of the Armed Forces of the Republic of Albania for acts of selflessness, sacrifice, bravery and courage performed during the execution of their duties or because of them, in time of peace or war.

In certain cases, the decoration may also be awarded to persons outside the Armed Forces for actions undertaken in defence of the territorial integrity of the Republic.

The medal may be received by foreign military personnel and is awarded more than once in the same grade.

== Grades ==
The Medal of Military Merit consists of three grades, arranged in descending order of precedence:

- Gold (Albanian: Medalja e Artë e Meritës Ushtarake)
- Silver (Albanian: Medalja e Argjendtë e Meritës Ushtarake)
- Bronze (Albanian: Medalja e Bronztë e Meritës Ushtarake)

The Gold medal constitutes the highest grade. Holders of the medal have precedence in state ceremonial activities in accordance with the rules of the Albanian state ceremonial and after death are accorded military honors.

== See also ==
- Orders, decorations, and medals of Albania
- Albanian Armed Forces
