= Medal for the 10th Anniversary of the Army =

Honorary decoration of the Republic of Albania

- Native name: Medalja e 10-vjetorit të Ushtrisë
- Type: Military medal
- Awarded for: Commemoration of the 10th anniversary of the foundation of the General Staff of the National Liberation Army
- Country: People's Socialist Republic of Albania
- Eligibility: Members of the Albanian armed forces and internal security forces
- Status: Discontinued
- Established: 30 May 1953
- First award: 10 July 1953
- Ribbon bar

The Medal for the 10th Anniversary of the Army (Albanian: Medalja e 10-vjetorit të Ushtrisë) was a commemorative military decoration of the People's Socialist Republic of Albania. It was established to mark the tenth anniversary of the creation of the General Staff of the National Liberation Army, which unified the communist partisan forces operating in the country during the Second World War.

== History ==
The medal was instituted on 30 May 1953 to mark the tenth anniversary of the foundation of the General Staff of the National Liberation Army. Ten years prior, the General Staff had brought the communist partisan formations operating against the Italian and German occupation forces under a unified military command.

The decoration was intended for members of the Albanian armed forces and internal security services who were on active duty in 1953. Recipients included generals, officers, warrant officers, soldiers and sailors serving in the People's Army or the Ministry of Internal Affairs. The medal was awarded for the first time on 10 July 1953.

== Insignia ==
The medal is a circular brass disc measuring 33 mm in diameter. Its obverse features two crossed rifles enclosed by an open wreath, surmounted by a small five-pointed star. Beneath the rifles are the number 10 and the word VJET ("years").

The reverse is inscribed with the tenth-anniversary dates and the legend 10 VJETORI I USHTRISË POPULLORE TË SHQIPËRISË ("10th Anniversary of the People's Army of Albania").

The medal was worn from a 20 mm-wide red ribbon with an 8 mm-wide green stripe running through the center. The ribbon bar followed the same orange-and-green pattern.

== Notable recipients ==
- Spiro Moisiu – major general and Chief of the General Staff of the National Liberation Army
- Alfred Moisiu – military officer and later President of Albania
- Haxhi Lleshi – military officer and Chairman of the Presidium of the People's Assembly
- Rustem Peçi – major general and commander of the United Officers' School
- Josif Zegali – military officer
- Hajdar Aranitasi – military officer
- Moisi Elezi – military officer
- Filip Tushi – military officer, editor and researcher
- Kasëm Kaçi – general of the Albanian State Police
- Sami Sulejman Kamberi – military officer
- Ali Kastrati – athlete, coach and sports administrator
- Rasim Imami – military officer and communications specialist

== See also ==
- Orders, decorations, and medals of Albania
- Albanian People's Army
