= Peza Conference =

Political history of Albania

The Peza Conference was held in Pezë, a village near Tirana in Albania, on September 16, 1942. The conference's goal and objective was to organize different political forces in the resistance against Italian rule. Later, this organization was named the National Liberation Movement.

== The History ==
The protagonists of this assembly were twenty representative delegates of different provinces, religious beliefs, classes and political convictions of Albania.

The participants came from different political currents. We can mention Abaz Kupi, Aziz Çami, Halim Begeja, Haxhi Lleshi, Ismail Petrela, Mustafa Xhani, Myslim Peza, Ndoc Çoba, Ramazan Jarani, Skënder Jegeni and Skënder Muço. Participants from the Communist Party of Albania were: Ymer Dishnica, Mustafa Gjinishi, Koço Tashko, Enver Hoxha, Nako Spiru and Nexhmije Xhuglini (më vonë Hoxha).

The chairman of the conference was chosen Ndoc Çoba and as a secretary Mustafa Gjinishi.

In the conference was discussed the organization of forces in a common war against the occupant, an organization later was named "The National Liberation Movement" (Albania).

Those that were present had a debate related to communist symbols, such as the red star, which was not accepted by the non-communists.

In the conference was approved a resolution, in which was told that the representatives of all national tendencies, The National Liberation Movement, The Communist Youth, the Nationalist Youth and The Popular Feminist Youth, approved the relevant statement, where it was supported the coalition against the opponents.
