= Year of Skanderbeg =

- Official logo
- Date: 17 January 2018
- Location: Albania
- Participants: Albanians worldwide

The Year of Skanderbeg (Albanian: Viti i Skënderbeut) was a nationwide commemorative year in Albania which coincided with the 550th anniversary of the death of the Albanian national hero, Skanderbeg. Announced on 17 September 2017, it was the first decision undertaken by Albanian prime minister Edi Rama during his second cabinet's first day in office.

A special commission was set up for the organizing and promoting of events leading up to the anniversary. Later in the year, two other anniversaries of fundamental importance in the History of Albania were celebrated: the "140th anniversary of the establishment of the League of Prizren" and the "110th anniversary of the Congress of Manastir".

At the same time, the Bank of Albania's supervisory council approved the issuance of a series of commemorative coins with the theme "550 years in memoriam Gjergj-Kastrioti Skanderbeg (1468-2018)". The series consists of three types of coins: 200 Lek in gold, 100 Lek in silver and 50 Lek in plain metal.

== See also ==
- Order of Skanderbeg
