= Orders, decorations, and medals of Albania =

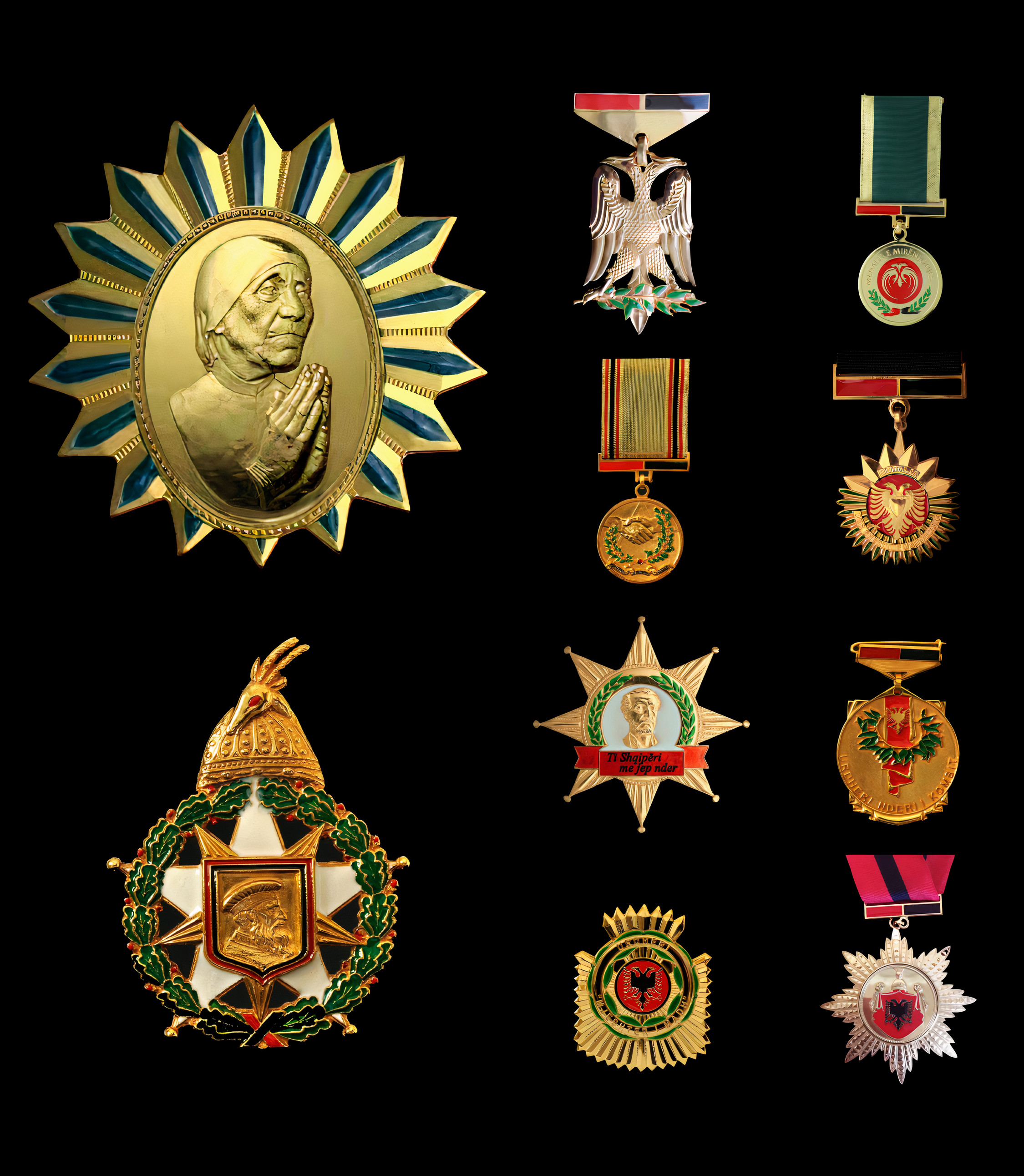
Presidential decorations, titles and medals of Albania: 1) "Mother Teresa" Decoration 2) "Gjergj Kastrioti Skënderbeu" Decoration 3) Golden Decoration of the Eagle 4) Medal of Gratitude 5) "Special Civil Services" Title 6) Medal for "Military Services" 7) "Naim Frashëri" Title 8) "Honor of the Nation" Decoration 9) "Grand Master" Title 10) National Flag Decoration

Orders, decorations and medals of Albania are state decorations regulated and bestowed by the Republic of Albania.

== History ==
The first decoration to be given in modern Albania is considered to be the Order of the Black Eagle, which was granted by the Principality of Albania in 1913.

In 1925, Ahmet Zogu, while President of Albania, instituted the Order of Skanderbeg. In 1926, he established the Order of Fidelity, also known as the Order of Besa.

Several laws were passed during Communist Albania. In 1960, the law On the creation of the honorary titles in the arts sector (Albanian: Mbi krijimin e titujve të nderit në sektorin e arteve) was passed by the Presidium of the People's Assembly.

In 1980, another law, entitled On the honorary titles and decorations in the Socialist People's Republic of Albania (Albanian: Për titujt e nderit dhe dekoratat e Republikës Popullore Socialiste të Shqipërisë), amended the 1960 law.

In 1996, the Parliament of Albania passed the law entitled On the decorations in the Republic of Albania (Albanian: Për dekoratat në Republikën e Shqipërisë). An addition to the 1996 law was made in 2001. A regulation on the awarding of the decorations was issued afterwards by President Alfred Moisiu.

== 1914–1939 ==
- Order of the Black Eagle (discontinued after 1914; retained as a dynastic order by the House of Wied)
- Medal of the Black Eagle
- Medal for the Accession of Prince William of Wied
- Order of Skanderbeg (1925–45) (discontinued after 1945; retained as a dynastic order by the House of Zogu)
- Collar of Honor of Albania
- Medal of Remembrance of the Triumph of Legality
- Order of Fidelity (discontinued after 1939; retained as a dynastic order by the House of Zogu)
- Military Order and Medal of Bravery

== Honors system (1945–1992) ==
Albanian orders and medals from the socialist period are poorly understood and seldom collected, even after three decades since the regime's collapse in 1992. While the awards of many other communist states flooded the market in the mid-1990s (most notably those of the Soviet Union, Bulgaria, and East Germany), Albanian medals continue to remain elusive for many. The manufacturing of Albanian awards has undergone several phases and seems to fall in line with Albania's shifting alliances during Enver Hoxha's regime.

The first decorations established by the new communist government were created on July 9, 1945: Hero of the People, Order of the Flag, Medal of Remembrance, Order of the Partisan Star, Order and Medal of Bravery.

These awards were established for services in the anti-Fascist and partisan campaigns of World War II against both the Italians and Germans and carried a great deal of prestige. Soon after, on October 13, 1945, three more orders and two additional medals were added: Order of Freedom, Order of Skanderbeg, Order and Medal of Labour, Medal of Liberation.

Between the end of 1945 and 1964, several other decorations were established, most notably the titles Hero of Socialist Labour and Mother Heroine, as well as a series of honorary titles for the arts and sciences. On January 18, 1965, the entire honors system was completely revised. In addition to establishing many new orders and medals, some pre-existing decorations were modified as well. The Order of the Red Star was expanded from one to three classes and a new medal was added. The Order for "Military Service" was converted from a breast star to a ribboned badge and expanded from one to three classes. The Order "For Patriotic Achievements" was added in three classes to the pre-existing medal. The Order "For the Defence of State Frontiers of the PRA/PSRA" was added to the pre-existing medal. The Order "For Maintenance of Public Security" was added to the pre-existing medal. The Order "For Civil Bravery" was added to the pre-existing medal, which was renamed from the Medal "For Bravery in Labor".

The 1965 awards structure remained largely intact with several minor additions and modifications up through to the collapse of the communist government. Law No. 6133. passed on February 2, 1980, codified many of the regulations and changes that were enacted since the 1965 restructuring. The 1980 law continued in effect until it was finally revoked by president Sali Berisha when he signed Law No. 8113 on March 28, 1996, which completely swept away the communist era honors system.

=== List of Awards ===
==== Titles ====
- Title of "Hero of the People" (Titulli "Hero i Popullit")
- Title of "Hero of Socialist Labour" ("Hero i Punës Socialiste")
- Title of "Mother Heroine" (Titulli "Nënë Heroinë)
- Title of "The People's Teacher" (Titulli "Mësues i Popullit")
- Title of "The People's Artist" (Titulli "Artist i Popullit")
- Title of "The People's Painter" (Titulli "Piktor i Popullit")
- Title of "The People's Sculptor" (Titulli "Skulptor i Popullit")
- Title of "Distinguished Labourer in Science & Technology" (Titulli "Punonjës i shquar i shkencës dhe i teknikës")
- Title of "Meritorious Teacher" (Titulli "Mësues i merituar")
- Title of "Meritorious Artist" (Titulli "Artist i merituar")
- Title of "Meritorious Painter" (Titulli "Piktor i merituar")
- Title of "Meritorious Sculptor" (Titulli "Skulptor i merituar")
- Title of "Distinguished Master of Profession" (Titulli "Per mjeshtër shquar ne profession")
- Title of "Exemplary Oil Worker and Exemplary Miner" (Titulli "Naftëtar i zgjedhur dhe minitor i zgjedhor")
- Title of "Good Oil Worker and Good Miner" (Titulli "Naftëtar i mirë dhe minitor i mirë")
- Title of "Distinguished Oil Worker and Distinguished Miner" (Titulli "Naftëtar i dalluar dhe minitor i dalluar")

==== Orders ====
- Order of Freedom (Urdhëri i Lirisë), Class I, II, III
- Order of the Flag (Urdhëri i Flamurit)
- Order of the Partisan Star (Urdhëri Ylli partizan), Class I, II, III
- Order of Skanderbeg (Urdhëri i Skënderbeut), Class I, II, III
- Order for Patriotic Achievements (Urdhëri Për veprimtari patriotike), Class I, II, III
- Order for Defence of the Socialist Homeland (Urdhëri Për mbrojtjen e Atdheut Socialist), Class I, II, III
- Order of the Red Banner of Labour (Urdhëri Flamuri Kuq i Punës), Class I, II, III
- Order of Bravery (Urdhëri i Trimërisë)
- Order of Labour (Urdhëri i Punës), Class I, II, III
- Order for Distinguished Labour in Mining & Geology (Urdhëri Për punë të shquar në miniera dhe në gjeologji), Class I, II, III
- Order for Distinguished Labour in Agriculture (Urdhëri Për punë të shquar në ekonominë bujqësore), Class I, II, III
- Order for Distinguished Defence Services (Urdhëri "Për shërbime të shquara në fushën e mbrojtjes"), Class I, II, III
- Order for Distinguished State & Community Service (Urdhëri Per shërbime të shquar shtetërore dhe shoqërore), Class I, II, III
- Order of Naim Frashëri (Urdhëri Naim Frashëri), Class I, II, III
- Order of Military Service (Urdhëri i Shërbimit Ushtarak), I, II, III
- Order of the Red Star (Urdhëri "Ylli i Kuq"), Class I, II, III
- Order for Brave Deeds (Urdhëri Për Vepra Trimërie), Class I, II, III
- Order of Maternal Glory (Urdhëri Lavdi Nënës), Class I, II, III
- Order for the Defence of the State Frontiers of the PRA/PSRA (Urdhëri Per mbrojtjen e kufirit shtetërore të RPSH/RPSSH)
- Order for Maintenance of Public Security (Urdhëri Për Ruajtjen e Rendit Shoqëror)
- Order for Civil Bravery (Urdhëri Per Trimëri Civile)
- Order for Meritorious Service to the People (Urdhëri Per shërbim të mire popullit)

==== Medals ====
- Medal of Remembrance (Medalja e Kujtimit)
- Medal of Bravery (Medalja e Trimërisë)
- Medal of Liberation (Medalja e çlirimit)
- Medal for Patriotic Achievements (Medalja Për veprimtari patriotike)
- Medal of Labour (Medalja e Punës)
- Medal for Distinguished Labour in Mining & Geology (Medalja Për punë të shquar në miniera dhe në gjeologji)
- Medal for Distinguished Labour in Agriculture (Medalja Për punë të shquar në ekonominë bujqësore)
- Medal for Distinguished Defence Service (Medalja Për shërbime të shquara në fushën e mbrojtjes)
- Medal for Distinguished State & Community Service (Medalja Per shërbime të shquar shtetërore dhe shoqërore)
- Medal of Naim Frashëri (Medalja Naim Frashëri)
- Medal for Brave Deeds (Medalja Për vepra trimërie)
- Medal of Military Service (Medalja e Shërbimit Ushtarak)
- Medal for Long Service in the Armed Forces (Medalja Për shërbim shumëvjeçar në forcat e armatosura)
- Medal for the Defence of the State Frontiers of the PRA/PSRA (Medalje Per mbrojtjen e kufirit shtetėrore tė RPSH/RPSSH)
- Medal for Maintenance of Public Security (Medalja Për Ruajtjen e Rendit Shoqëror)
- Medal for Bravery in Labour (Medalja Për trimëri në punë) (1956-1965)

replaced by

- Medal for Civil Bravery (Medalja Per trimëri civile) (1965)
- Medal of the Red Star (Medalja Ylli i Kuq)
- Medal for Meritorious Service to the People (Medalja Per shërbim të mire popullit)
- Medal for Arts (Medalje e artë)
- Medal for Motherhood (Medalja e Nënës), Class I, II
- Medal for the 10th Anniversary of the Army (Medalja e 10-vjetorit të Ushtricë)
- Medal for the 40th Anniversary of the Labour Party of Albania (Medalja e 40-Vjëtorit i Partia Punës e Shqipërisë)

== Titles and Decorations of the President (1996–present) ==
=== Decorations ===
- "Honor of the Nation" Decoration (Dekorata "Nderi i Kombit" )
- National Flag Decoration (Dekorata e Flamurit Kombëtar)
- "Gjergj Kastrioti Skënderbeu" Decoration (Dekorata "Gjergj Kastrioti Skënderbeu")
- "Mother Teresa" Decoration (Dekorata "Nënë Tereza")
- Golden Decoration of the Eagle ("Dekorata e Artë e Shqiponjës")
- Torchbearer of Democracy Medal (Medalja "Pishtar i Demokracisë")
- Order of the Academic Oak (Urdhri i Lisit Akademik)
- Supreme Order of the Eagle

=== Titles ===
- "Knight of Skanderbeg Order" Title (Titulli "Kalorës i Udhërit të Skënderbeut")
- "Knight of the Order of the Flag" Title (Titulli "Kalorës i urdhrit të flamurit")
- "Grand Master" Title (Titulli "Mjeshtër i Madh")
- "Naim Frashëri" Title (Titulli "Naim Frashëri")
- Military Services Medal (Medalja "Për Shërbime Ushtarake")
- Special Civil Merits Medal (Medalja "Për Merita të Veçanta Civile")
- Martyr of Democracy Medal (Medalja "Martir i Demokracisë")
- Medal of Gratitude ("Medalja e Mirënjohjes")

== Medals of the Prime Minister (2019–present) ==
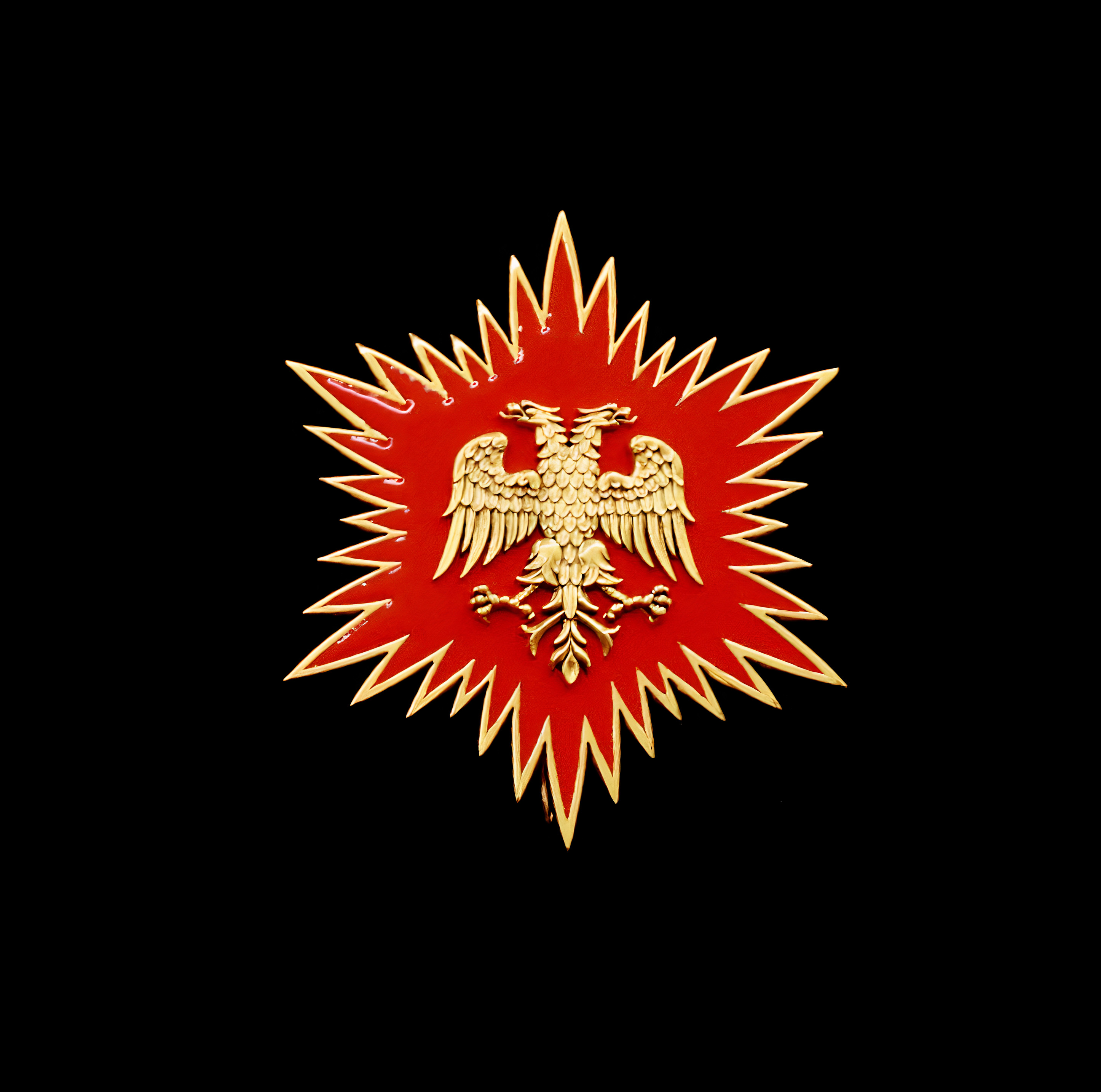
Great Star of Public Gratitude

Medal of Public Gratitude

The medal consists of three classes and is awarded to prominent Albanian and foreign individuals with special contributions in the field of their activities:

1. Big Cordon with a Star for Public Acknowledgment
2. Great Star of Public Gratitude
3. Star of Public Gratitude

Medal of Professional Assessment

The medal consists of three classes (Gold, Silver, Bronze) and is awarded to prominent individuals with contributions in their professional activities.

== See also ==
- Sports titles system in Albania
- Chancellery of Orders and Medals of the Republic
