= Order and Medal of Bravery =

Albanian state decoration

Order and Medal of Bravery Urdhri dhe Medalja e Trimërisë
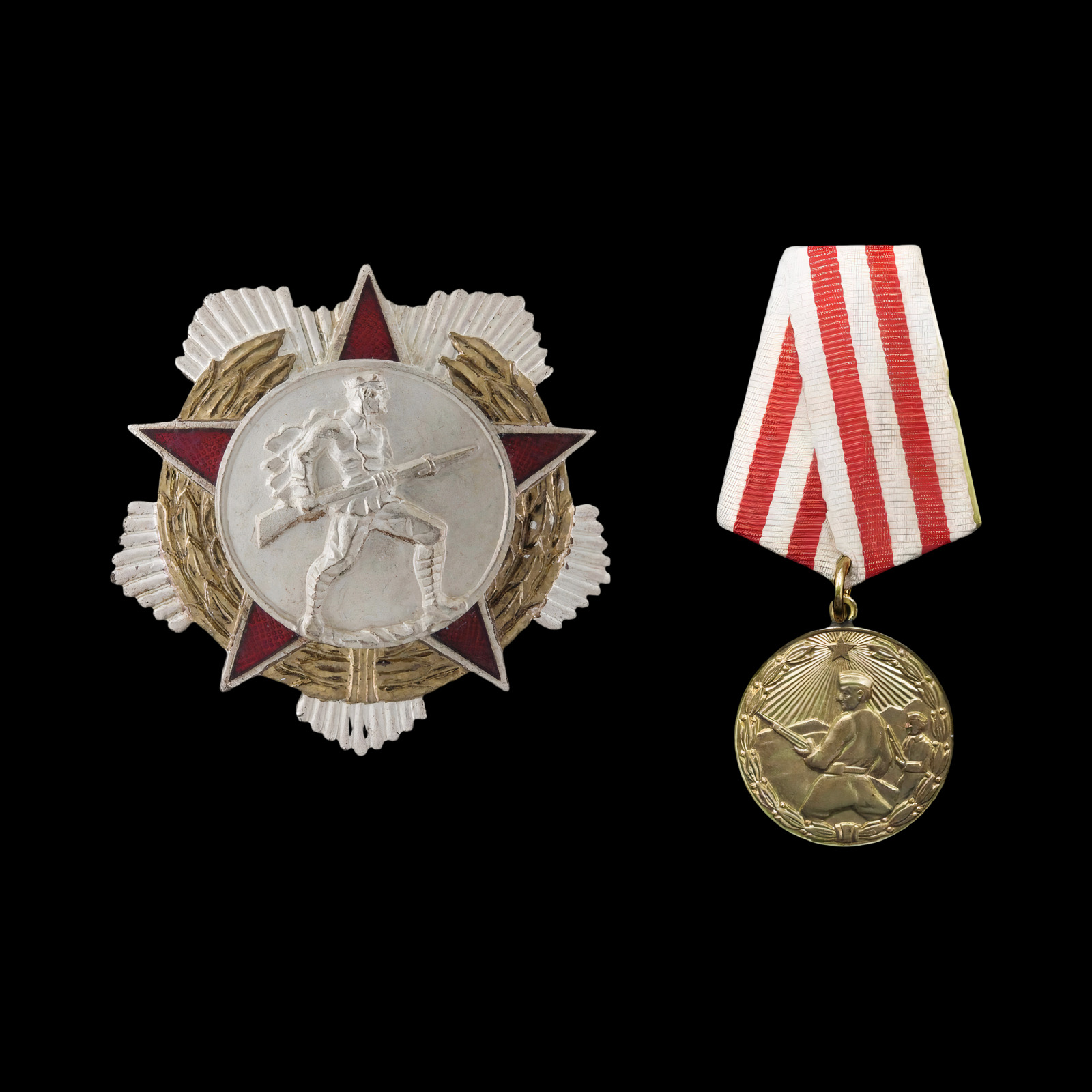

Awarded by The Presidium of the People's Assembly
- Established: 9 July 1945
- Country: People's Socialist Republic of Albania
- Criteria: Awarded to the citizens, families and military units who participated in the national war of liberation
- Status: Abolished
- Classes: I
- Ribbon bar

The Order and Medal of Bravery (Albanian: Urdhëri dhe Medalja e Trimërisë) were honorary awards given to the citizens, families and military units in the People's Socialist Republic of Albania.

== Definition ==
The order and medal were given to citizens, families, units and subdivisions of the military that participated in the National Liberation War and fought with bravery and self-sacrifice against the enemy, as well as for bravery shown in cases of aggression or provocation on a large scale against the People's Socialist Republic of Albania.

== See also ==
- Orders, decorations and medals of Albania
