= Medal of Remembrance =

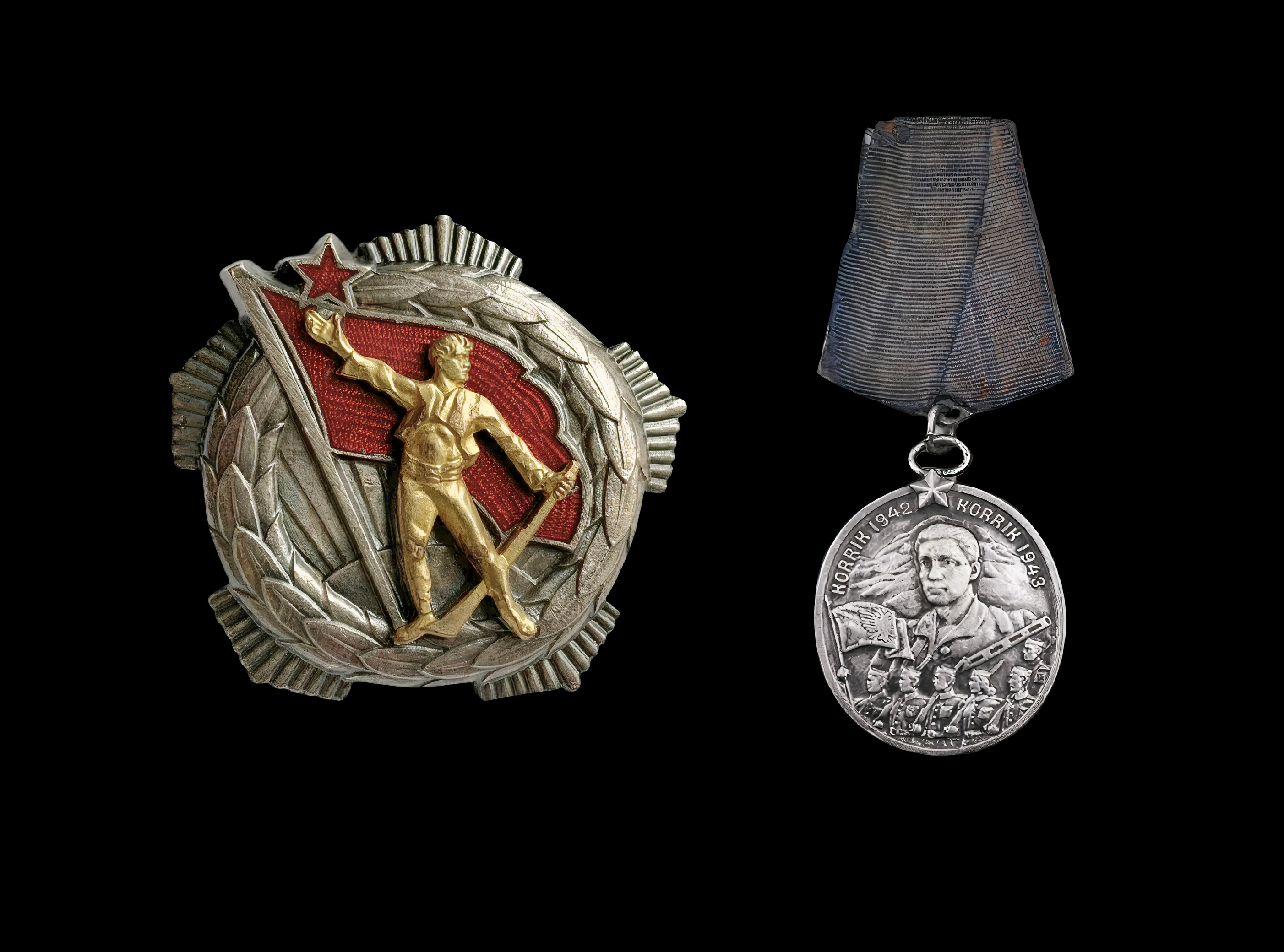
- Native name: Medalja e Kujtimit
- Type: Military medal
- Awarded for: Awarded to the people and army formations who participated in the national war of liberation
- Country: People's Socialist Republic of Albania
- Presented by: The Presidium of the People's Assembly
- Status: Abolished
- Established: 9 July 1945
- Ribbon bar

The Medal of Remembrance (Albanian: Medalja e Kujtimit) was an honorary award given to the people and army formations in the People's Socialist Republic of Albania.

== Definition ==
The medal was given to the people and the army formations who took part in the National Liberation War without interruption, before July 10, 1943 (the date of formation of the General Staff of the Albanian National Liberation Army) until the country's liberation.

== See also ==
- Orders, decorations, and medals of Albania
