= Order of the Partisan Star (Albania) =

Awarded by The Presidium of the People's Assembly
- Established: 9 July 1945
- Country: People's Socialist Republic of Albania
- Criteria: Awarded to officers and military units in time of war
- Classes: Class I, II, III
- 1st Class 2nd Class 3rd Class

The Order of the Partisan Star (Albanian: Urdhëri "Ylli Partizan") was an honorary award given to officers and military units in the People's Socialist Republic of Albania.

== Definition ==
The order was given to active and reservist officers of the People's Army, the Ministry of Internal Affairs, the Volunteer Forces of the People's Self-Defence, military units, and subdivisions for military service in time of war.

The "Partisan Star" order had three classes: I, II, III.

== See also ==
- Orders, decorations and medals of Albania
