= State decoration =

Object awarded by a sovereign state

A state decoration is an object, such as a medal or the insignia of an order, that is awarded by a sovereign state to honor the recipient.

The term includes civil awards and decorations, as well as military awards and decorations.

== See also ==
- List of civil awards and decorations
- List of military decorations
- State order
