= List of compositions by Niccolò Paganini =

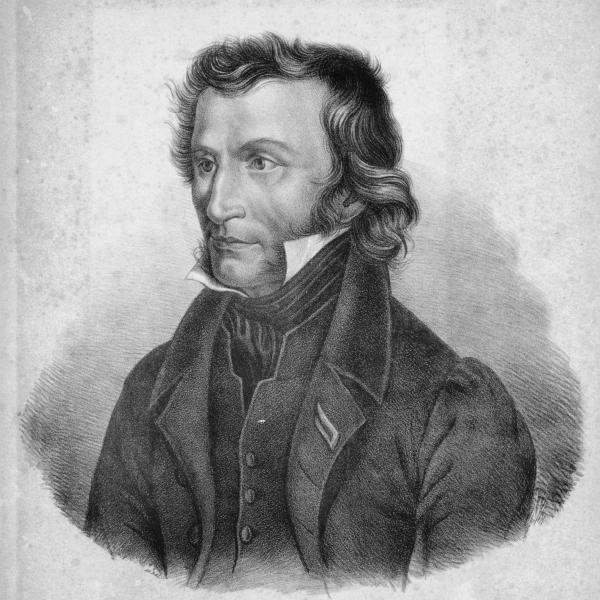
Paganini

This is a list of compositions by Niccolò Paganini (1782–1840).

== With MS number ==
Year	Op.	M.S. catalog	Title	Key	Instruments	Notes
1795 c.		1	Carmagnola con variazioni (Carmagnola variations)	A	Violin / Guitar	14 Variations on the French Hymn "Carmagnole"
1803	61	2	Sonata concertata	A	Violin / Guitar	
1803/04	39	3	Grande Sonata	A	Violin / Guitar	
1804		4	"Divertimenti Carnevaleschi", 21 pieces		Strings	for 2 violins and cello; (aka. Divertimenti Carnascialeschi); sections: Minuetto, Alessandrina 1–6, Perigordino 1–2, Valzer 1–4, Scozzese, Inglese 1–6, Variazioni
1805/09		5	Sonata "Napoleone"	E♭	Violin / Orch.	Sonata with variations for the fourth string
1805/09		6	Duo Merveille (Sonata for solo violin)	C	Violin	(aka. Duet for solo violin, Merveille de Paganini)
1805/09		7	3 "Lucca" Sonatas (Opera III)		Violin / Guitar	
1805/09		8	"Entrata d'Adone nella reggia di Venere"		Violin / Guitar	Entrance of Adonis in the Royal Palace of Venus
1805/09		9	6 "Lucca" Sonatas (Opera I)		Violin / Guitar	
1805/09		10	6 "Lucca" Sonatas (Opera II)		Violin / Guitar	
1805/09		11	6 "Lucca" Sonatas (Opera IV)		Violin / Guitar	
1805/09		12	6 "Lucca" Sonatas (Opera V)		Violin / Guitar	
1805/09		13	6 "Lucca" Sonatas (Opera VI)		Violin / Guitar	
1805/06		14	Serenata per Rovene	e	Mandolin / Guitar	also for violin and guitar
1805/06		15	4 Notturni a Quartetto		Violin / Piano	also for string quartet
1805/06		16	Serenata	g	Mandolin / Guitar	
1808	69	17	Sonata (Serenata)	C	Guitar / Strings	guitar, viola and cello
1810 (before)		18	Polacca con variazioni	A	Violin / Orch.	Polacca with variations
1813	8	19	Le Streghe (aka. Witches Dance)	D	Violin / Orch.	Variations on a theme from the ballet of Salvatore Viganò's Il noce di Benevento, music by Franz Xaver Süssmayr. First performed at a solo concert in La Scala on October 29, 1813. The audience was so impressed that they requested a repeat. Jean Schneitzhoeffer was so inspired by Paganini's performance that he based the scene of Old Madge's witchcraft which opens act 2 of his ballet La Sylphide (1832) on Le Streghe.
1815 c.		20	3 String Quartets	d, E♭, a	String Quartet	2 violins, viola and cello
1816	6	21	Violin Concerto No.1	E♭	Violin / Orch.	Usually transposed to D
1819	12	22	"Non più mesta accanto al fuoco" (Introduzione e variazioni su)	E♭	Violin / Orch.	Introduction and Variations on a Theme from La Cenerentola, Rossini
1818/19	24	23	Sonata "a Preghiera" (aka. Moses Fantasy)	c/C	Violin / Orch.	Variations for the fourth string on the theme "Dal tuo stellato soglio" from Mosè in Egitto, Rossini
1819		24	Pot-Pourri		Violin / Orch.	1831
1818 (before)	1	25	24 Capricci		Violin	in the form of études, dedicated Alli Artisti
1805/09	2	26	6 Sonatas (Sonatine)	A, C, d, A, D, a	Violin / Guitar	dedicated "Al Signor Agostino Dellepiane": No.1 (I. Menuetto. Adagio; II. Polonese. Quasi Allegro) – No.2 (I. Larghetto espressivo; II. Allegro spiritoso) – No.3 (I. Adagio maestoso; II. Andantino. Galantemente) – No.4 (I. "La Sinagoga". Andante Caleando; II. Andantino con brio) – No.5 (I. Andante moderato. Impostatamente; II. Allegro spiritoso) – No.6 (I. Largo. Con precisione; II. Tempo di Valtz).
1805/09	3	27	6 Sonatas (Sonatine)	A, G, D, a, A, e	Violin / Guitar	dedicated "Alla ragazza Eleonora (Quilici)": No.1 (I. Larghetto; II. Presto variato) – No.2 (I. Adagio; II. Andantino scherzoso) – No.3 (I. Andante sostenuto; II. Rondò. Molto allegro) – No.4. (I. Andante. Largo; II. Allegretto motteggiando) – No.5 (I. Adagio amoroso; II. Allegretto energicamente. Minore) – No.6 (I. Andante innocentemente; II. Allegro vivo e spiritoso).
1806/16	4/1	28	Guitar Quartet No.1	a	Guitar / Strings	for guitar, violin, viola and cello / (I. Introduzione. Andante marcato – Vivace: II. Minuetto alla marsigliese. Andantino; III. Tema. Adagetto cantabile – Var.I-III) / 1813–15c, 1806–16
1806/16	4/2	29	Guitar Quartet No.2	C	Guitar / Strings	for guitar, violin, viola and cello / (I. Moderato; II. Minuetto. Andante; III. Larghetto; IV. Rondò. Allegretto) / 1813–15c, 1806–16
1806/16	4/3	30	Guitar Quartet No.3	A	Guitar / Strings	for guitar, violin, viola and cello / (I. Pour-pourri. Allegro; II. Minuetto alla spagnola. Andantino; III. Romanza. Adagio non tanto; IV. Rondò. Allegretto) / 1813–15c, 1806–16
1813/15	5/1	31	Guitar Quartet No.4	D	Guitar / Strings	for guitar, violin, viola and cello / dedicated "Alle amatrici" (I. Presto; II. Canone a tre. Andante sottovoce e staccato – Trio; III. Tema. Cantabile, quasi larghetto – Var.I-III; IV. Finale. Prestissimo)
1813/15	5/2	32	Guitar Quartet No.5	C	Guitar / Strings	for guitar, violin, viola and cello / dedicated "Alle amatrici" (I. Allegro; II. Minuetto. Allegretto; III. Cantabile. Larghetto; IV. Polacca. Quasi presto)
1813/15	5/3	33	Guitar Quartet No.6	d	Guitar / Strings	for guitar, violin, viola and cello / dedicated "Alle amatrici" (I. Allegro; II. Canone a tre. Allegro moderato; III. Tema. Cantabile, quasi larghetto – Var.I-III; IV. Polacchetta. Allegro con brio)
1817/18		34	Guitar Quartet No.7	E	Guitar / Strings	for guitar, violin, viola and cello (I. Allegro moderato; II. Minuetto. Allegretto; III. Adagio cantabile. Sostenuto con passione; IV. Rondò. Vivace)
1817/18		35	Guitar Quartet No.8	A	Guitar / Strings	for guitar, violin, viola and cello (I. Allegro; II. Minuetto. Andantino; III. Cantabile. Molto adagio; IV. Rondò. Allegretto)
1818		36	Guitar Quartet No.9	D	Guitar / Strings	for guitar, violin, viola and cello (I. Allegro moderato; II. Minuetto alla Valtz. Allegretto mosso; III. Adagio. Sostenuto, appassionatamente; IV. Finale. Allegro vivace)
1818		37	Guitar Quartet No.10	A	Guitar / Strings	for guitar, violin, viola and cello (I. Allegro; II. Minuetto Scherzo. Allegretto mosso; III. Adagio cantabile; IV. Rondò. Andantino con brio)
1819		38	Guitar Quartet No.11	B	Guitar / Strings	for guitar, violin, viola and cello (I. Allegretto moderato; II. Minuetto. Allegretto; III. Larghetto, con passione; IV. Polacca. Andantino)
1819		39	Guitar Quartet No.12	a	Guitar / Strings	for guitar, violin, viola and cello (I.Allegro giusto; II. Adagio tenuto, con precisione; III. Minuetto. Allegretto mosso)
1819		40	Guitar Quartet No.13	F	Guitar / Strings	for guitar, violin, viola and cello (I. Allegro con brio; II. Minuetto. Allegretto; III. Larghetto, tenuto con anima; IV. Finale. Prestissimo)
1819		41	Guitar Quartet No.14	A	Guitar / Strings	for guitar, violin, viola and cello (I. Allegro maestoso; II. Minuetto Scherzo. Allegretto; III. Largo con sentimento; IV. Finale. Allegro vivace)
1820		42	Guitar Quartet No.15	a	Guitar / Strings	for guitar, violin, viola and cello (I. Maestoso; II. Minuetto a canone. Andantino; III. Recitativo. Andante sostenuto, con sentimento; IV. Adagio cantabile; V. Rondò. Allegretto)
1820 c.		43	43 Ghiribizzi (phantasies)		Guitar	No.16 "Nel cor più non mi sento" (Violin solo version, 1821) / No. 11 Var II. from Paganini's own "Moses Fantasy" / No.17 "Le Streghe" / No.20 "Là ci darem la mano" (Don Giovanni) / No. 5 Rossini's "Non più mesta"
1827	38	44	Nel cor più non mi sento	G	Violin	Introduction and variations on "Nel cor più non mi sento" from La Molinara (1788) by Giovanni Paisiello
1823/24	19	45	Cantabile e Valtz	E	Violin / Guitar	1823, 1824c
1824		46	Sonata Militare ("Non più andrai")		Violin / Orch.	Variations for the fourth string on the theme "Non piu andrai" from The Marriage of Figaro, Mozart
1818 c.		47	Sonata con variazioni ("Pria ch'io l'impegno")	E	Violin / Orch.	Variations on the theme "Pria ch'io l'impegno" from L'amor marinaro, Joseph Weigl / 1818, 1828
1826	7	48	Violin Concerto No.2	b	Violin / Orch.	3rd movement (Rondo) aka. La Campanella, Rondo a la clochette
1826 c.		49	Adagio	E	Violin / Orch.	Alternative Adagio for Violin Concerto No.2
1826		50	Violin Concerto No.3	E	Violin / Orch.	
1828		51	Maestosa sonata sentimentale		Violin / Orch.	Variations for the fourth string on the theme "Gott erhalte Franz den Kaiser" (Austrian national anthem) by Joseph Haydn
1828		52	La Tempesta ("Grande Sonata drammatica")		Violin / Orch.	While in Vienna, Paganini commissioned Joseph Panny, fellow violinist and composer, to write the "Tempest" on 25 May 1828 (it was completed on 14 June), supervising himself the composition. It is scored in various sections: a) Prelude. Whirlwind – b) Start of the Storm – c) Prayer – d) Alarm at Sea – d) Great Storm – e) General Alert – f) Calm (Andantino cantabile) – g) Finale (Theme, 2 Variations and Coda). Violin and Piano reduction by Daniele Zanettovich – World modern première – video on YouTube
1828		53	E pur amabile		Vocal / Piano	
1828		54	Capriccio	G	Violin	(aka. Preludio)
1831 c.		55	Sonatina e Polacchetta (with variations)	B♭	Violin / Orch.	1829, 1831
1829	9	56	Variations on "God Save the King" (Heil dir im Siegerkranz)		Violin	Variations on the English national anthem (aka. "God Save the Queen")
1829		57	Sonata Varsavia		Violin / Orch.	Variations on a mazurka by J. Elsner / Violin part only, orchestral parts lost
1828/29		58	Sonata Appassionata		Violin / Orch.	1829, 1828
1829	10	59	Il Carnevale di Venezia ("The Carnival of Venice")	A	Violin / Orch.	Variations on the neapolitan song "O mamma, mamma cara"
1829/30		60	Violin Concerto No.4	d	Violin / Orch.	
1830		61	Sonata amorosa Galante		Violin / Orch.	
1830		62	Quel jour heureux ("Chant patriotique")		Vocal / Misc.	for soloist, male choir and piano, on a text by George Harry
1831		63	Rondo	A	Violin / Cello	
1831		64	St Patrick's Day		Violin / Orch.	Variation on the Irish folktune
1831 c.		65	Concertino "to Mr.Henry"	E	Misc. / Orch.	for horn, bassoon and orchestra / dedicated to "Mr. Antoine Nicholas Henry" (I. Larghetto; II. Allegro moderato)
1831/32		66	Perpetuela (Sonata a movimento perpetuo)	C	Violin / Orch.	2 versions (incomplete work): with piano or orchestra (A or B♭)
1828/32		67	Le Couvent du Mont St.Bernard (The Couvent of the Mount Saint Bernard)		Misc. / Orch.	for violin, wordless chorus and orchestra (I. Andante sonnolento; II. Pendule. Lento; III. Minuetto. Moderato; IV. L'aurora. Lento – Maestoso; V. Rondò del campanello)
1831/33		68	Caprice d'adieu (Farewell Caprice)		Violin	Dedicated "A mon ami M. E. Eliason" / 1831c, 1833c
1833	66	69	Terzetto	D	Guitar / Strings	for guitar, violin and cello
1834		70	Sonata per la Grand Viola (Sonata for large viola)	c	Viola / Orch.	
1835	14	71a	Variazioni sul Barucabà (Barucaba variations)		Violin	(original version for solo violin) 60 Variations on the Genoese folksong "Barucabà" (Part I: Tema in A major, with 20 Var. – Part II: Tema in C major, with 20 Var. – Part III: Tema in D major, with 20 Var.)
1835	14	71b	Variazioni sul Barucabà (Barucaba variations)		Violin / Guitar	(2nd version for violin and guitar) 60 Variations on the Genoese folksong "Barucabà"
1835	11	72	Moto Perpetuo (Perpetual Motion)	C	Violin / Guitar	(Allegro vivace a movimento perpetuo) / (Violin and Piano version, ed. by Ferdinand David)
1835	11	72	Moto Perpetuo (Perpetual Motion)	C	Violin / Orch.	(Allegro vivace a movimento perpetuo)
1838 c.		73	La Primavera, Sonata with variations	A	Violin / Orch.	violin part only, Arr. acc. Piano M. Kergl (1952)
1838 c.		74	Balletto Campestre, Variazioni su un tema comico		Violin / Orch.	Variations on a comic theme
1815 (before)		75	Violin Concerto No.6 (aka. No."0")	e	Violin / Orch.	orchestration from the Guitar manuscript by Federico Mompellio and Francesco Fiore, published in 1973
1819/26	33	76	Tarantella	a	Violin / Orch.	
1819	13	77	I palpiti (Heartbeats)	A	Violin / Orch.	Introduction and Variations on the theme "Di tanti palpiti" from Tancredi, Rossini
1830		78	Violin Concerto No.5	a	Violin / Orch.	orchestral parts reconstructed in 1959 by Federico Mompellio
1810/1813		79	Sonata "Maria Luisa"	E	Violin / Orch.	Sonata with variations for the fourth string / Orch. (part lost) / Guitar (arr. version) / 1810, 1813
		80	Valtz		Violin	
		81	Inno patriottico (Patriotic hymn)	A	Violin	Allegro with 6 variations
		82	Tema variato	A	Violin	Theme with 7 variations
		83	Sonata for solo violin	A	Violin	
		84	37 Sonatas (Sonate)		Guitar	
		85	5 Sonatinas (Sonatine)		Guitar	6 Sonatine
		86	Allegretto	A	Guitar	from 12 pieces without number (c or d1)
		87	Sonata	E	Guitar	
		88	Andantino	G	Guitar	
		89	Andantino	C	Guitar	from 12 pieces without number (b or f2)
		90	Allegretto	A	Guitar	from 12 pieces without number (c or d1)
		91	Allegretto	a	Guitar	
		92	Valtz	C	Guitar	from 12 pieces without number (e1 or e2)
		93	Rondo	a	Guitar	
		94	Rondoncino	E	Guitar	
		95	Allegretto	C	Guitar	
		96	Valtz	E	Guitar	from 12 pieces without number (f1)
		97	Andantino	C	Guitar	from 12 pieces without number (b or f2)
1800c		98	Sinfonia della Lodovisia	D	Guitar	
		99	Andantino	G	Guitar	
		100	Valtz	C	Guitar	from 12 pieces without number (e1 or e2)
		101	Trio	F	Guitar	
		102	Andantino	f	Guitar	
		103	Marcia	A	Guitar	
		104	Sonata "Che va chiamando Dida"	A	Guitar	aka. "Minuetto e Perigordino"
		105	Marziale	E	Guitar	
		106	Minuetto	E	Mandolin	
1802 c.		107	3 Duetti (Concertante duets)	E♭, G, A	Strings	violin and cello
		108	Sonata a violino e viola		Strings	violin and viola
1822/24	17	109	Cantabile	D	Violin / Piano	
		110	6 Duetti		Violin / Guitar	Nos.3–6 originally published as "Quattro Sonatine"
1807	63	111	Duetto amoroso	C	Violin / Guitar	I. Principio (Beginning): Allegretto; II. Preghiera (Prayer): Andante; III. Acconsentito (Acconsented): Allegretto; IV. Timidezza (Shyness): Allegro; V. Contentezza (Happiness): Andantino; VI. Lite (Argument): Allegro assai; VII. Pace (Peace): Comodo; VIII. Segnale d'amore (Love Sign): Allegretto; IX. Notizia della partenza (News of departure): Allegretto moderato; X. Distacco (Separation): Allegro molto.
1828 (after)	64	112 A	Centone di sonate, (18) Sonatas – Lettera A (Nos.1–6)	a, D, C, A, E, A	Violin / Guitar	1. No.1 (I. Introduzione. Larghetto; II. Allegro maestoso. Tempo di marcia, Maggiore; III. Rondoncino. Allegro, Trio. Minore) – 2. No.2 (I. Adagio cantabile; II. Rondoncino. Andantino, Tempo di Polacca, Minore) – 3. No.3 (I. Introduzione. Prestissimo; II. Larghetto cantabile) – 4. No.4 (I. Adagio cantabile: II. Rondò. Andantino, Allegretto, Minore) – 5. No.5 (I. Allegro assai; II. Andantino vivace, Var.I, Var.II: Minore, Var.III: Maggiore) – 6. No.6 (I. Larghetto cantabile; II. Rondò. Allegro assai, Trio).
1828 (after)	64	112 B	Centone di sonate, (18) Sonatas – Lettera B (Nos.7–12)	F, G, A, C, a, D	Violin / Guitar	7. No.1 (I. Allegro giusto. Buonamente; II. Polacca. Andantino, Allegretto, Trio) – 8. No.2 (I. Andante cantabile; II. Rondò. Allegretto, Trio) – 9- No.3 (I. Allegro maestoso. Tempo di marcia; II. Tema e variazioni. Andante placido, Var.I: Terzine, Var.II, Var.III: Più mosso) – 10. No.4 (I. Allegro risoluto; II. Rondò. Andantino vivace – Tempo di Pastorale, Trio) – 11. No.5 (I. Cantabile. Andante appassionata, con flessibilità; II. Tema e variazioni. Allegro moderato, Var.I, Var.II, Minore; III. Finale. Tempo di Valtz) – 12. No.6 (I. Andante cantabile; II. Rondò. Allegretto, Trio).
1828 (after)	64	112 C	Centone di sonate, (18) Sonatas – Lettera C (Nos.13–18)	E, G, A, E, A, C	Violin / Guitar	13. No.1 (I. Introduzione. Maestoso, Larghetto. Cantabile; II. Rondò. Allegretto con brio, Trio) – 14. No.2 (I. Andante Adagetto; II. Rondò. Allegro molto vivace, Trio) – 15. No.3 (I. Introduzione. Maestoso; II. Tema e variazioni. Andante moderato, Terzine, Minore, Maggiore; III. Rondò. Allegretto, Trio, Maggiore) – 16. No.4 (I. Allegro vivace; II. Minuetto a Valtz. Allegro vivo, Trio) – 17. No.5 (I. Introduzione. Andante, Corrente, Andante cantabile; II. Rondò. Allegro vivo, Trio) – 18. No.6 (I. Allegro. Presto; II. Rondò a Balletto. Allegro vivissimo, Trio).
1800 (before)		113	3 Ritornelli		Strings	for 2 violins and cello
1833	68	114	Terzetto concertante	D	Guitar / Strings	for guitar, viola and cello
		115	Serenata	F	Guitar / Strings	for guitar and 2 violins
	67	116	Terzetto	a	Guitar / Strings	for guitar and 2 violins
1820c		117	Nel cor più non mi sento	A	Violin / Strings	for violin, 2nd violin and cello
1802 c.		118	Sonata a violino scordato		Violin / Strings	for solo violin "detuned" and 2 violins
		119	Sul margine d'un rio		Vocal / Piano	
		120	Ghiribizzo vocale		Vocal / Misc.	for soprano, violin and guitar
		121	Canzonetta	C	Vocal / Guitar	vocal part lost
		122	Duetto	G	Violin / Guitar	
		123	Concerto		Violin / Orch.	
		124	Sonatina No.1		Violin / Guitar	
		125	Sonatina No.2		Violin / Guitar	
		126	Sonatina No.3		Violin / Guitar	"Cantabile a Minuetto e Valtz"
		127	Sonatina No.4		Violin / Guitar	"Cantabile e Valtz"
		128	Sonatina No.5		Violin / Guitar	"Cantabile e Valtz"
		129	Sonatina No.6		Violin / Guitar	"Cantabile e Valtz"
1800 c.		130	3 Duetti (Three Concertante Duets)		Violin / Bassoon	Heirs of Ernesto Camillo Sivori, private collection, Genoa / ed. I. Vescovo & F.M. Noguera (Milan, 1997)
		131	Sei nuovissime Alessandrine		Misc.	for 2 violins, clarinet, 2 horns and cello
		132	Sonata and Variations		Guitar / Strings	for guitar, violin, viola and cello
1805/09	3	133	6 "Lucca" Sonatas, Nos.1–6		Violin / Guitar	No.1 (I. Amoroso; II. Andantino) – No.2 (I. Larghetto compassionevolmente; II. Allegretto scherzando) – No.3 (I. Lento e con grazia; II. Andantino brillante) – No.4 (I. Quasi andante con sentimento; II. Allegro) – No.5 (I. Con anima e trasporto; II. Andantino con brio) – No.6 (I. Quasi larghetto e con enfasi; II. Andantino motteggiando).
1805/09	8	134	6 "Lucca" Sonatas, Nos.7–12		Violin / Guitar	No.1 (I. Allegro; II. Adagio con espressione; III. Allegro con brio) – No.2 (I. Introduzione: Largo – Andante con grazia; II. Andantino scherzando – Variazione 1 – Minore – Variazione 2) – No.3 (I. Larghetto sentimentalmente; II. Polonese, andantino brillante) – No.4 (I. Adagio, non tanto; II. Grazioso, allegretto) – No.5 (I. Adagio affettuoso; II. Andantino corrente – Variazione 1 – Minore – Variazione 2) – No.6 (I. Adagio con amore; II. Polonese, allegro con energia).

== Without MS number ==
=== Violin solo ===
- Quattro Studi per violino solo (orig. name Studj No.4) Quattro studi per violino solo – Società Editrice di Musicologia :
  - No. 1 in C major [Allegretto]
  - No. 2 in A major (Moderato)
  - No. 3 in C major (Moderato assai)
  - No. 4 in G major (Sostenuto)

=== Guitar solo ===
- 5 pieces for Guitar (1800)
- 12 pieces for Guitar without number:
  - a1) Minuetto (E)
  - a2) Rondo Allegro (E)
  - b) Andantino (C) ??(MS.89 or 97)
  - c) Allegretto (A) ??(MS.86 or 90)
  - d1) Allegretto (A) ??(MS.86 or 90)
  - d2) Minuetto (a)
  - e1) Valtz (C) ??(MS.92 or 100)
  - e2) Valtz (C) ??(MS.92 or 100)
  - e3) Rondocino(C)
  - f1) Valtz (E) ??(MS.96)
  - f2) Andantino (C) ??(MS.89 or 97)
- 5 pieces for Guitar (First edition : Milan, Ricordi, 1975):
  - Scherzo (C)
  - Sonatine (C)
  - Rondo (C)
  - Allegretto (E)
  - Menuet (E)

=== Chamber music ===
- "6 Duettini" for violin and guitar
- "Variazioni di bravura" (on Caprice No.24) for violin and guitar
- "6 Duetti Fiorentini" for violin and piano (Ed. Max Kergl)
- "Sonata a violino principale" (for solo violin, violin and cello)
- "Introduzione e tema con variazioni" (for solo violin and string quartet)
- "6 Preludi" (for 2 violins and bass)
- "4 Studies" for solo violin
- "6 Preludes" for solo violin

=== Vocal ===
- "Vocal Fantasy" (aria for soprano and orchestra)
- La Farfalletta (for voice and piano)

== Doubtful works ==
- "Divertimenti concertanti" for violin and piano (?MS.viN4)
- "3 airs variés pour être exécutés sur la quatrième corde seul pour violon avec accompagnement de pianoforte" (3 Varied Airs to be executed on the fourth string alone for violin with piano accompaniment)^{(G. Carulli)} (?MS.vN3)
- "Les charmes de Padoue" (Padua attractions) for violin and piano (First public exhibition: London, 1831) (?MS.vN5)
- "Tema Napolitana" (Padua attractions) for violin and piano^{(part lost)} (?MS.vN11)

== Lost ==
- Capriccio on "Là ci darem la mano" (1828) for violin and orchestra _{(from Mozart's Don Giovanni, perf. Vienna, 11 May 1828)}
- "Fandango Spagnolo" (1800) for violin
