= Sonata Napoleone =

- by Niccolò Paganini
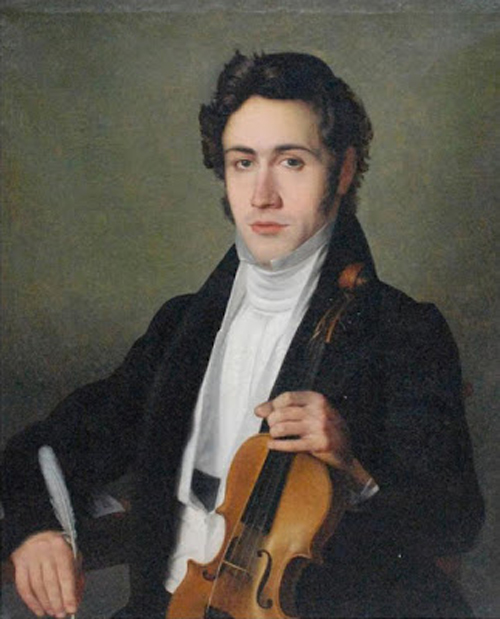
- Niccolò Paganini in his youth
- Key: E♭ major
- Catalogue: MS 5
- Opus: Op. 31 (Posthumous)
- Year: 1807
- Form: Variations
- Duration: 10 minutes approximately
- Scoring: Violin and orchestra

The Sonata Napoleone, Op. 31, MS 5, sometimes also entitled Napoléon or Sonata sulla IV corda, is a composition for violin and orchestra by Italian composer Niccolò Paganini. It is one of the earliest compositions by Paganini and the earliest to be composed only for the fourth string.

== Background ==
Paganini's first work for the G string, the Sonata Napoleone, was composed while he was appointed as a musician for the Court in Lucca between 1805 and 1808. It was written in 1807 on the occasion of the name day of Napoleon Bonaparte. At the time, Paganini served as maestro di musica to Princess Elisa Baciocchi, Napoleon Bonaparte's sister, who was very fond of music but mildly disliked the violin. The composition was dedicated to her, as she later had a romantic relationship with the composer. This was the basis for Franz Lehár's Paganini (1925).

The Sonata Napoleone was the first of several works that Niccolò Paganini composed for the G string, a practice he continued in subsequent years to show his technical command by making frequent shifts up and down the fingerboard. In fact, in performance, he is reported to have removed the other three strings of the violin when playing such pieces, as violinist Louis Spohr criticized, “in order to drive the point home.”

The composition was not published in his lifetime. The original violin and guitar arrangement was meant to be orchestrated. It was only published many years later, in 1940, by Casa Ricordi in Milan, in a reduction for violin and piano by Michelangelo Abbado. It was reprinted again in 1968, 1984 and 1997. It was assigned Op. 31 posthumously by publishers, though not in a rigorous or authoritative way. As a result, most catalogues and recordings do not list it with an opus number.

== Structure ==
The piece is in E♭ major and is conceived as a concertante work for violin and orchestra, with the solo part written entirely on the fourth string. As with several other works by Niccolò Paganini, including the Maestosa sonata sentimentale and the Sonata with Variations on “Pria ch’io l’impegno”, the designation “sonata” does not correspond to a formal sonata structure, but rather to a generic, historically-sound “piece to be played” meaning. Paganini’s focuses on the exploration of the violin’s technical possibilities, which corresponds with his activity principally as a virtuoso performer rather than as a composer concerned with formal development. Accordingly, the variations do not present a significant melodic departure from the original material and are designed primarily to display instrumental technique.

It is structured as follows:

- Introduction. Adagio - Larghetto
- Theme. Andantino variato
- Variation I
- Variation II
- Variation III
- Finale

A common practice for Niccolò Paganini was the use of scordatura to facilitate technical execution. In this work, the G string is retuned upward by three semitones to B♭ for the introduction, and by four semitones to B♮ for the remainder of the piece.

== Recordings ==
The following is a list of recordings of the composition:

Recordings of Niccolò Paganini's Sonata Napoleone
Violin	Conductor (or instrumentalist)	Orchestra	Date of recording	Place of recording	Label	Notes
Salvatore Accardo	Charles Dutoit	London Philharmonic Orchestra	January 1976	Barking Town Hall, London, UK	Deutsche Grammophon	
Massimo Quarta	Stefania Redaelli (piano)	—	September 1998	Dynamic's, Genoa, Italy	Dynamic	Recording of the 1968 reduction for violin and piano by Michelangelo Abbado.
Mario Hossen	Alexander Swete (guitar)	—	March 2017	Casino Baumgarten, Vienna, Austria	Dynamic	

== Reception ==
Accounts of his performances are largely lost nowadays. However, it is known that at a concert held on August 16, 1911, Paganini created "a furor in Parma."
