= Duo merveille =

Sonata in C major
- Duo merveille Merveille de Paganini
- by Niccolò Paganini
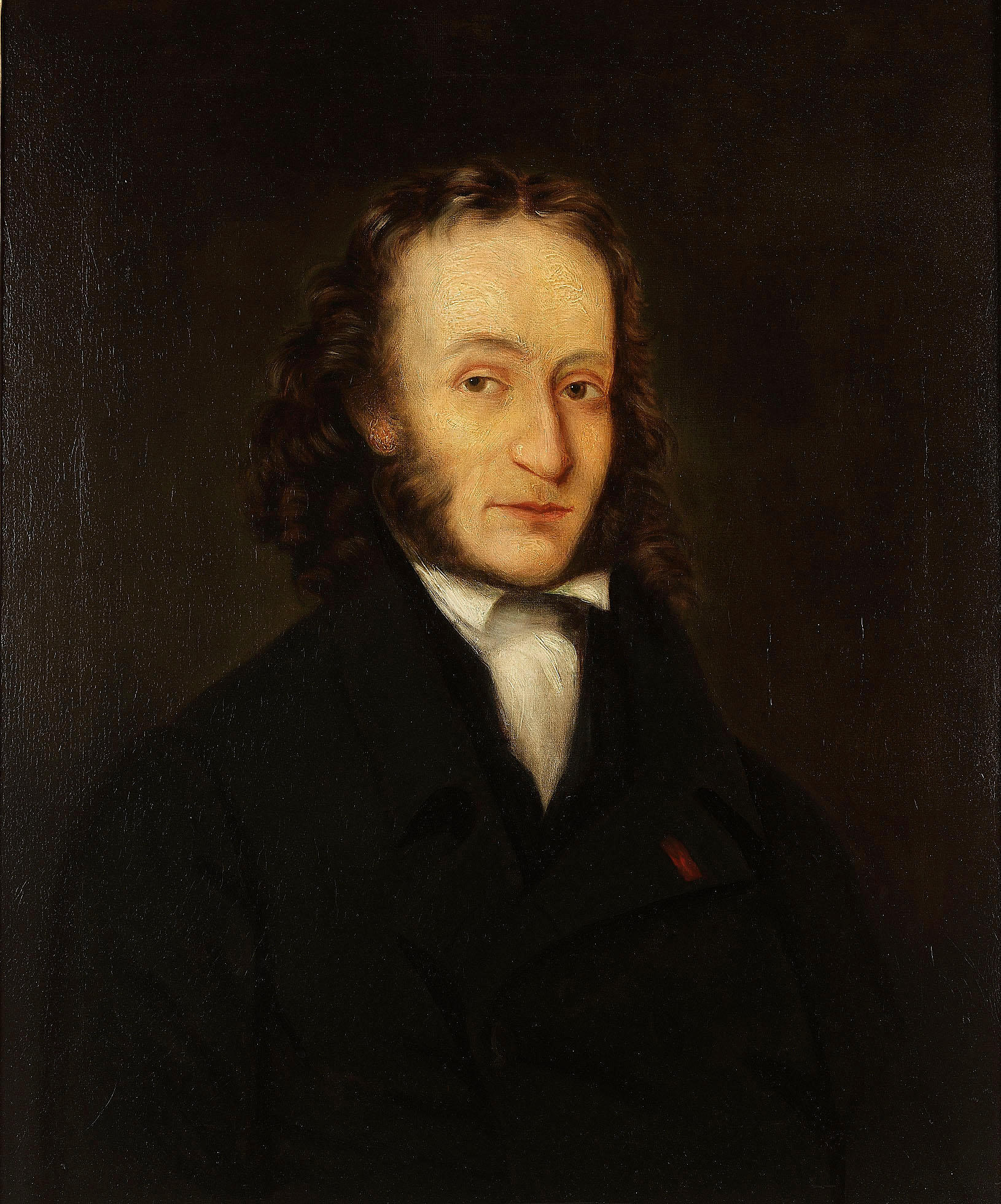
- The composer
- Catalogue: MS 6
- Year: Between 1805 and 1808
- Dedication: Elisa Baciocchi
- Duration: 3 minutes approximately
- Scoring: Solo violin

The Sonata in C major, MS 6, also commonly referred to as Duo merveille or Merveille de Paganini, (Note: Other commonly used titles include Sonata No. 1 for Solo Violin, Duo de Paganini, and Duetto di Paganini.) is a composition for solo violin by violin virtuoso Niccolò Paganini. Notable for being written on two staves, like a true duo, it is one of the composer’s earliest works.

== Background ==
The Duo merveille was composed at an undetermined point between 1805 and 1808 and is considered one of the earliest works by Paganini. It was written as a gift for Elisa Baciocchi, née Maria Anna Bonaparte and sister of Napoleon Bonaparte, with whom Paganini is believed to have had a brief romantic affair. During this period, Paganini enjoyed the favor of the Bonaparte family and served as first court violinist at Baciocchi’s court in the Republic of Lucca. The work was effectively dedicated to her, at a time when she was Princess of Lucca and Piombino. She later became Grand Duchess of Tuscany in 1808.

After its composition, the piece fell into relative obscurity. Although conceived as a gift, it was not published by Paganini himself and was therefore not circulated widely. As a matter of fact, it was considered spurious for a long time, and Paganini denied the authorship of Duo merveille and other pieces published without his consent in his lifetime. The manuscript eventually came into the possession of Antonio Pacini, an Italian music publisher who played an important role in promoting Paganini’s works. Pacini, who actively wanted to disseminate Paganini’s music, approached publishers with the intent of printing his pieces.

The work was finally published in 1829, when Carl Guhr included it in his treatise Über Paganini’s Kunst die Violine zu spielen (1829). This publication, which contains works by various composers, also includes the Variations on “Nel cor più non mi sento” (1819), and presents the sonata under the title Merveille de Paganini. The original manuscript is now preserved at the Biblioteca Casanatense. It consists of two pages of notated music. Following its first publication, the work has been reissued numerous times by different publishers, often in limited or local editions rather than through widespread international circulation.

== Structure ==
The sonata is in the key of C major and is scored for solo violin, but it is written in such a way that it simultaneously combines a bowed melody with left-hand pizzicato accompaniment, all performed on a single instrument. For this reason, it is referred to as a “duo,” despite requiring only one performer. To reinforce this concept, Niccolò Paganini notated the work on two separate staves: one for the arco (bowed line) and the other for the pizzicato accompaniment. The composition lasts approximately three minutes, spans 46 bars, and is divided into two contrasting sections, outlined below:

- Adagio
- Allegro molto

== Recordings ==
The following is a list of recordings of Paganini's Duo merveille:

Recordings of Duo Merveille, by NIccolò Paganini
Violin	Date of recording	Place of recording	Record label	Notes
Salvatore Accardo	January 1978	Residenz, Herkulessaal, Munich, Germany	Deutsche Grammophon	
Stefan Milenkovich	October 2002	Dynamic's, Genoa, Italy	Dynamic	
