= Gasparo Ghiretti =

Italian composer and violinist (1747–1797)

Gasparo Ghiretti (1747 in Naples – 1797 in Parma) was an Italian composer, counterpointist and violinist who served as chamber musician to Ferdinand, Duke of Parma in the last part of the 1700s. In his position, he was master teacher to a number of talented musicians, including composer and Duke's chapelmaster Ferdinando Paer; Ferdinando Orlandi (1774–1848); Angelo Maria Benincori; and most famously, a young Niccolò Paganini, who studied with Ghiretti for several months and possibly as long as two years. In addition to violin technique, Ghiretti's teaching focused on harmony, counterpoint, theory and composition.
