= Variations on "Nel cor più non mi sento" =

Introduction and Variations on "Nel cor più non mi sento"
- by Niccolò Paganini
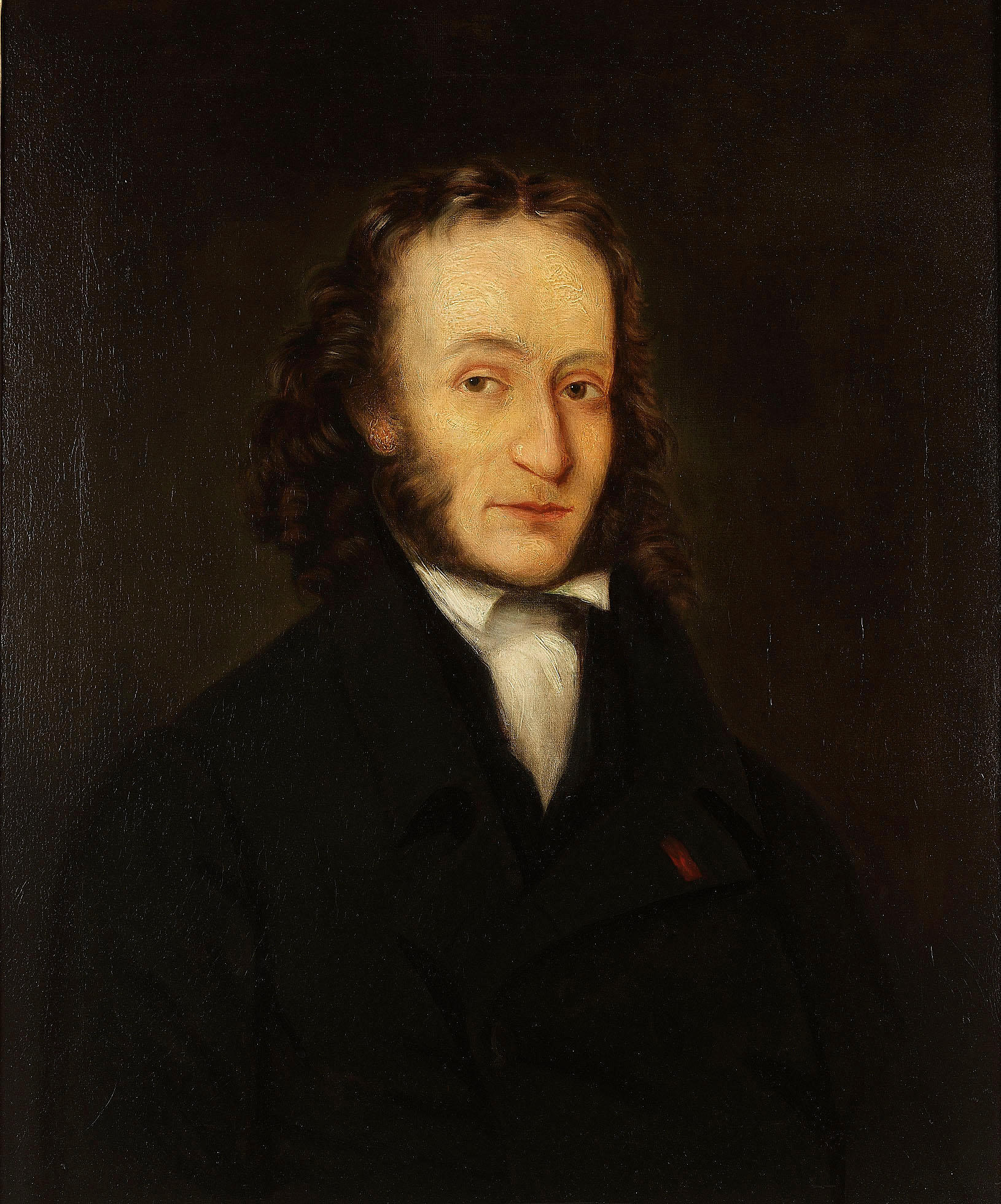
- The composer
- Key: G major
- Catalogue: MS 44
- Opus: Op. 38
- Year: ca. 1821
- Form: Theme and variations
- Duration: 13 minutes approximately
- Scoring: Solo violin

The Introduction and Variations on "Nel cor più non mi sento", (Note: The work never had a proper title, as it was not meant for publication. Paganini himself used variations of the current title, as Nel cor più non mi sento or Capriccio a violino solo / In cor più non mi sento. Publishers and recordings use slightly different versions of a longer descriptive title, usually referring to it as an Introduction [or Capriccio], Theme and Variations on the Aria "Nel cor più non mi sento", from the opera "La molinara" by Giovanni Paisiello.) Op. 38, MS 44, is a composition for solo violin by Genoan virtuoso Niccolò Paganini. Finished around 1821, it was a popular feature in the composer's concerts around Europe.

== Background ==
According to the date recorded in the autograph manuscript, “Nel cor più non mi sento” was completed in Naples on November 23, 1821. The theme used in the composition is drawn from the popular aria “Nel cor più non mi sento”, from the opera La molinara by Giovanni Paisiello. The opera was first performed in Naples in 1788 under the title L’amor contrastato, and later revived in Venice in 1798 under its more familiar title. It was also met with considerable success in German-speaking regions, where it was known as Die schöne Müllerin. In that version, the aria appeared under the title “Mich fliehen alle Freuden.”

Very little is known about the precise origins of the composition, but like much of Niccolò Paganini’s oeuvre, it was not published during his lifetime. It is still not clear whether he performed it publicly before 1828. However, in a letter dated December 19, 1827, written in Milan to L. G. Germi, Paganini mentions that he would perform “the Variations without orchestra, in which [he] alone produce[s] the complete harmony.” The work subsequently became a regular feature of his concert repertoire between 1828 and 1834. The earliest documented performance took place in Vienna on April 15, 1828, after which Paganini performed it widely across the German states, France, the United Kingdom, and the Italian peninsula. Following the composer’s death in 1840, various manuscript sources came to light. The only known autograph manuscript in Paganini’s hand is preserved at the Deutsche Staatsbibliothek in Berlin. This source contains only the opening capriccio, two variations (Andante and Presto), and a short codetta. An additional sketch also survives, though it includes numerous deletions and remains incomplete.

Despite numerous attempts at reconstruction, no single definitive version of the work exists. The most widely known edition is that published by Carl Guhr in Über Paganinis Kunst die Violine zu spielen (1829). Although not prepared by Paganini himself, it presents a more or less reliable reconstruction based on the recollections of contemporary musicians. Its credibility is supported, in part, by the inclusion of the two variations found in the surviving autograph, here placed at the end of the piece. At the same time, contemporary accounts indicate that Paganini frequently altered the variations in performance, often never repeating them in exactly the same way. This version has become the most widely accepted among performers and publishers and has often been treated as the authoritative form of the work. It was republished by Schott Music in Mainz in 1909 in an edition prepared by August Wilhelmj, and later by Editio Musica Budapest in an edition edited by Tibor Ney. A modern edition based directly on the surviving autograph was published much later, in 1960, in Frankfurt am Main by Musikverlag Wilhelm Zimmermann. Edited by Erwin Schwarz-Reiflingen, this edition includes only the Andante and Presto sections.

=== Other versions ===
Several derivative works stem from this composition. The earliest is a potpourri for violin and orchestra (MS 24), composed in 1821 in Naples. Another version appears as a set of variations for violin with accompaniment by a second violin and cello (MS 117). A third adaptation was written for guitar and included in Ghiribizzi (MS 43).

== Structure ==
This composition is scored for solo violin and follows a formal pattern typical of many works by Paganini, consisting of an introduction followed by a theme with variations. The introduction, entitled "Capriccio", is a highly fragmented passage in which the violinist demonstrates mastery of a range of extended techniques. It lacks a time signature and, unlike the subsequent sections, is not organized into regular metric groupings. After a series of rapid arpeggios and other features, it modulates to D major, the dominant of the work’s principal key, G major.

All subsequent sections are in 6/8 time and in G major. As in many of Paganini’s compositions, the variations exhibit limited melodic or thematic development, instead functioning primarily as vehicles for the virtuosity of the performer. Each variation highlights specific technical demands, including left-hand pizzicato, harmonics, and double-stop tremolos.

The total duration of the composition is over 13 minutes. The composition is structured as follows:

- Capriccio [Introduction]
- Theme. Andante
- Variation I. Brillante
- Variation II
- Variation III. Più lento
- Variation IV. Allegro
- Variation V
- Variation VI. Appassionato
- Variation VII. Vivace
- Coda

== Recordings ==
The following is a list of recordings of Paganini's Variations on "Nel cor più non mi sento":

Recordings of Introduction, Theme, and Variations on "Nel cor più non mi sento", by NIccolò Paganini
Violin	Date of recording	Place of recording	Record label	Notes
Salvatore Accardo	January 1978	Residenz, Herkulessaal, Munich, Germany	Deutsche Grammophon	
Ilya Gringolts	January 1999	Länna Church, Strängnäs, Sweden	BIS	
Stefan Milenkovich	October 2002	Dynamic's, Genoa, Italy	Dynamic	
Luca Fanfoni	November 2012	BartokStudio, Bernareggio, Italy	Dynamic	
Giuliu Plotino	April 2017	Palazzo Tursi, Genoa, Italy	Dynamic	
Luca Fanfoni	November 2023	Palazzo dei Congressi, Sala delle Cariatidi, Salsomaggiore Terme, Italy	Dynamic	
