= La primavera (Paganini) =

Sonata for Violin and Orchestra in A minor
- La primavera
- Sonata with variations by Niccolò Paganini
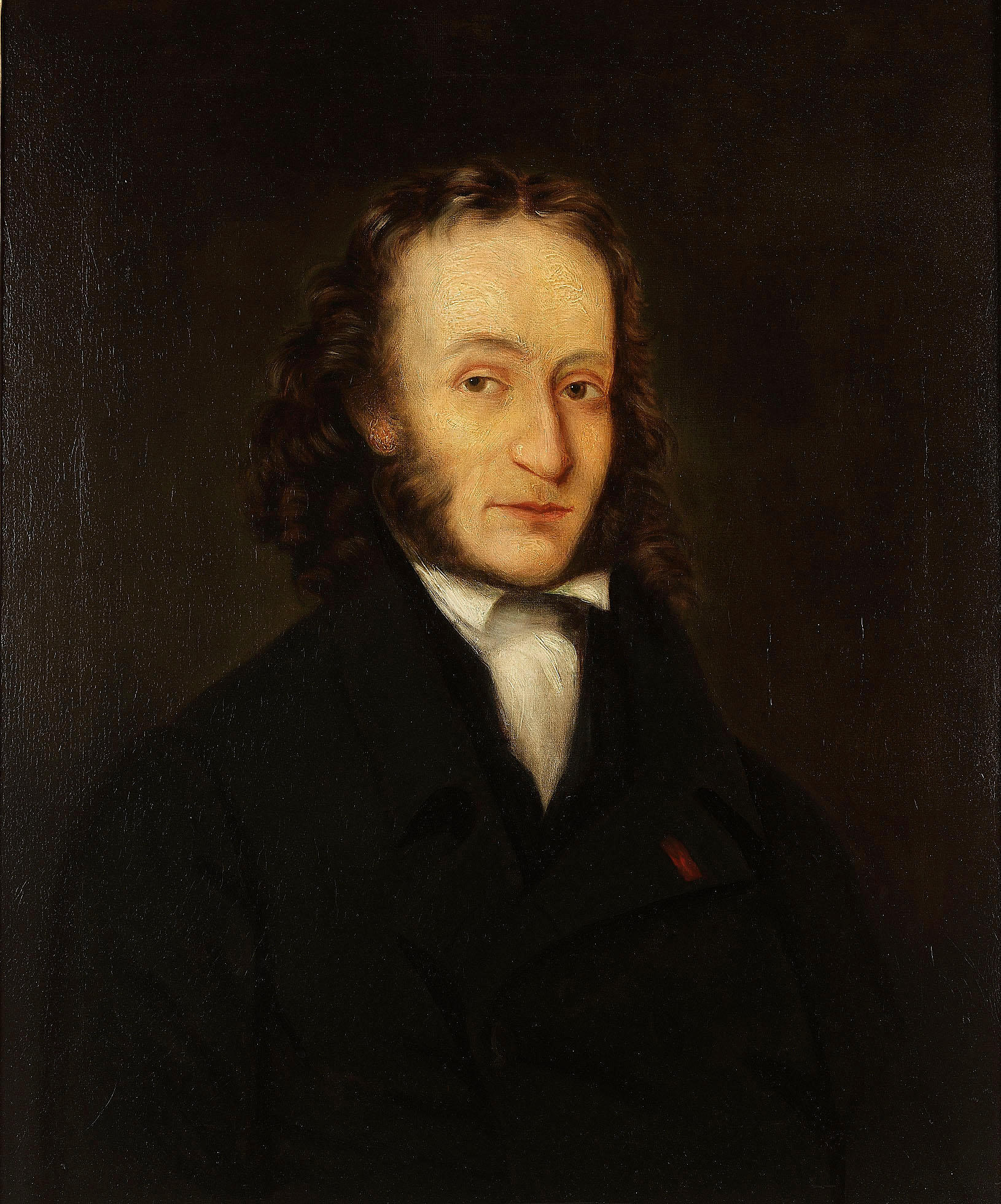
- The composer around the time of the composition
- Catalogue: MS 73
- Year: 1838
- Form: Sonata (Theme and variations)
- Duration: 17 minutes approximately
- Movements: 10
- Scoring: Violin and orchestra (unorchestrated)

The Sonata for Violin and Orchestra in A minor, MS 73, subtitled and commonly referred to as La primavera (from Italian: "Spring"), is a sonata with variations by violin virtuoso Niccolò Paganini. Originally written in 1838, it was one of Paganini's last compositions and was left unorchestrated at the time of Paganini's death.

== Background ==
Paganini wrote La primavera in 1838, at a time when he was struggling financially. While living in Paris, he had set up the Casino Paganini, which failed shortly after opening, leaving him with significant debt and the threat of legal action. These difficulties forced him to sell his possessions, including some of his instruments. In the midst of these troubles, he decided to write short pieces, rather than full concertos, to showcase his abilities during his concert tours, just before traveling to Nice. Paganini wrote to his friend Luigi Germi on June 11, 1838: "I have composed two very grand sonatas with variations, and I am now writing a third. I shall orchestrate them." However, in subsequent letters, he revealed that depression and poor physical health prevented him from completing the piece. Paganini died just two years later, at the age of 57, leaving only the violin part and some sketches for orchestration.

The piece was likely never published, as it was left incomplete. Various attempts to amend, complete, or alter sections have been made, but none has prevailed or gained wide acceptance. Given its nature as a virtuoso showpiece, performers often modify the work, either adopting arrangements by unknown hands or creating their own. A manuscript copy by the Italian composer Marco Anzoletti was produced in the first decade of the 20th century. It includes several modifications to the original composition, notably a completely new and extended introduction. However, it was not orchestrated and remained a handwritten work for violin and piano. Today, it is preserved at the Biblioteca comunale di Trento. An additional manuscript, presumably made at the request of Paganini's son, Achille Paganini, was made by Giusto Dacci and revised for the violin by Romeo Franzoni between 1880 and 1915. As of March 2026, the only typeset score in print is the version arranged by Giusto Dacci and edited by Vincenzo Bolognese. This edition was published in Rome in 1997 by Boccaccini & Spada Editori.

== Structure ==
The piece is nominally described as a "sonata with variations" in A major; however, it is largely a concertante piece that follows a theme-and-variations structure, with a few notable sections not explicitly designated as variations. It does not conform to traditional sonata form. The work has an approximate duration of 17 minutes and is scored for violin and orchestra, although Paganini did not complete the orchestral parts himself. Performers have also drawn on Paganini's surviving sketches to create versions for violin and piano. The section list is as follows:

- Introduzione. Andante sostenuto
- Larghetto cantabile (Amoroso)
- Variazione
- Recitativo. Allegro moderato
- Tema gentile. Andante
- Iª variazione
- IIª variazione
- IIIª variazione (Minore).
- IVª variazione (Maggiore). Allegro
- Coda (Finale). Più presto

== Recordings ==
Its unusual nature has meant that the work has not been recorded very often. A notable performance of an orchestral arrangement by an unknown arranger was recorded by violinist Salvatore Accardo with conductor Charles Dutoit and the London Philharmonic Orchestra for Deutsche Grammophon in April 1975 at Barking Town Hall, London. Another performance of the arrangement for violin and piano made by Giusto Dacci was recorded by violinist Mario Hossen and pianist Nadja Hoebarth. The recording was released under the Dynamic label in 2018.
