= Angelo Maria Benincori =

18th–19th century Italian composer

Angelo Maria Benincori (28 March 1779 – 30 December 1821) was an Italian composer. He wrote string quartets and, in Paris, endeavoured to be a successful composer of operas; his greatest success in that genre, the performance of his completion of Nicolas Isouard's opera Aladin, came a few weeks after his death. He was most admired for his string quartets.

== Life ==
Benincori was born in Brescia on March 28, 1779. His father was secretary to the Duke of Parma; at Parma he studied, at an early age, music theory with Gasparo Ghiretti and violin with Alessandro Rolla; his concert debut, aged eight, was at the ducal court, playing a violin concerto. He later studied with Domenico Cimarosa. Aged 14, he wrote a mass which was performed.

In 1797 Benincori traveled to Spain with his brother, the cellist Giuseppe Benincori. The trip was unprofitable with the brother losing all their money, and Giuseppe contracting a fever which led to his death. Angelo's opera Nitteti (1797) was produced in Italy, and well received also in Vienna about 1800. In Vienna he met Joseph Haydn, with whose string quartets he was so impressed as to abandon dramatic composition for a time and write only quartets. The string quartet is the form in which he achieved his greatest success as a composer; most of which were written in a vein clearly influenced by Haydn.

In 1803 he went to Paris, where his quartets had been published, and wrote two operas, Galatée ou le Nouveau Pygmalion and Hésione, which were accepted by the Académie Impériale de Musique but never performed. Meanwhile, he struggled to gain a living by teaching. Théâtre Feydeau staged three comic operas by Benincori: Les Parents d'un jour (1815; libretto by Amédée de Beauplan); La promesse de Mariage ou Le Retour au Hameau (1818; libretto by Michel Dieulafoy and Nicolas Gersin), and Les Epoux indiscrets ou Le danger des confidences (1819; libretto by Saint-Alme and C. de Saint-Just). They were not successful.

He was commissioned to complete an opera by Nicolas Isouard, who had died leaving his opera Aladin ou la lampe merveilleuse (libretto by Charles-Guillaume Étienne) unfinished. Most of the first two acts had been written; Benincourt composed the remaining three acts, parts of the first two acts, and the overture.

Benincori died in Belleville, Paris on 30 December 1821, aged 42, six weeks before Aladin opened on 6 February 1822. It was enthusiastically received; the theatre was lit by gas lighting for the first time, which may have contributed to its success. The opera had a further 137 performances.

He left many compositions in manuscript, including a symphony dedicated to Haydn, and a mass. The scores of his operas staged at the Théâtre Feydeau were not published, but some of the arias were printed.
