= Variations on "Pria ch'io l'impegno" (Paganini) =

Sonata and Variations in E major on a Theme by Joseph Weigl
- Sonata with variations by Niccolò Paganini
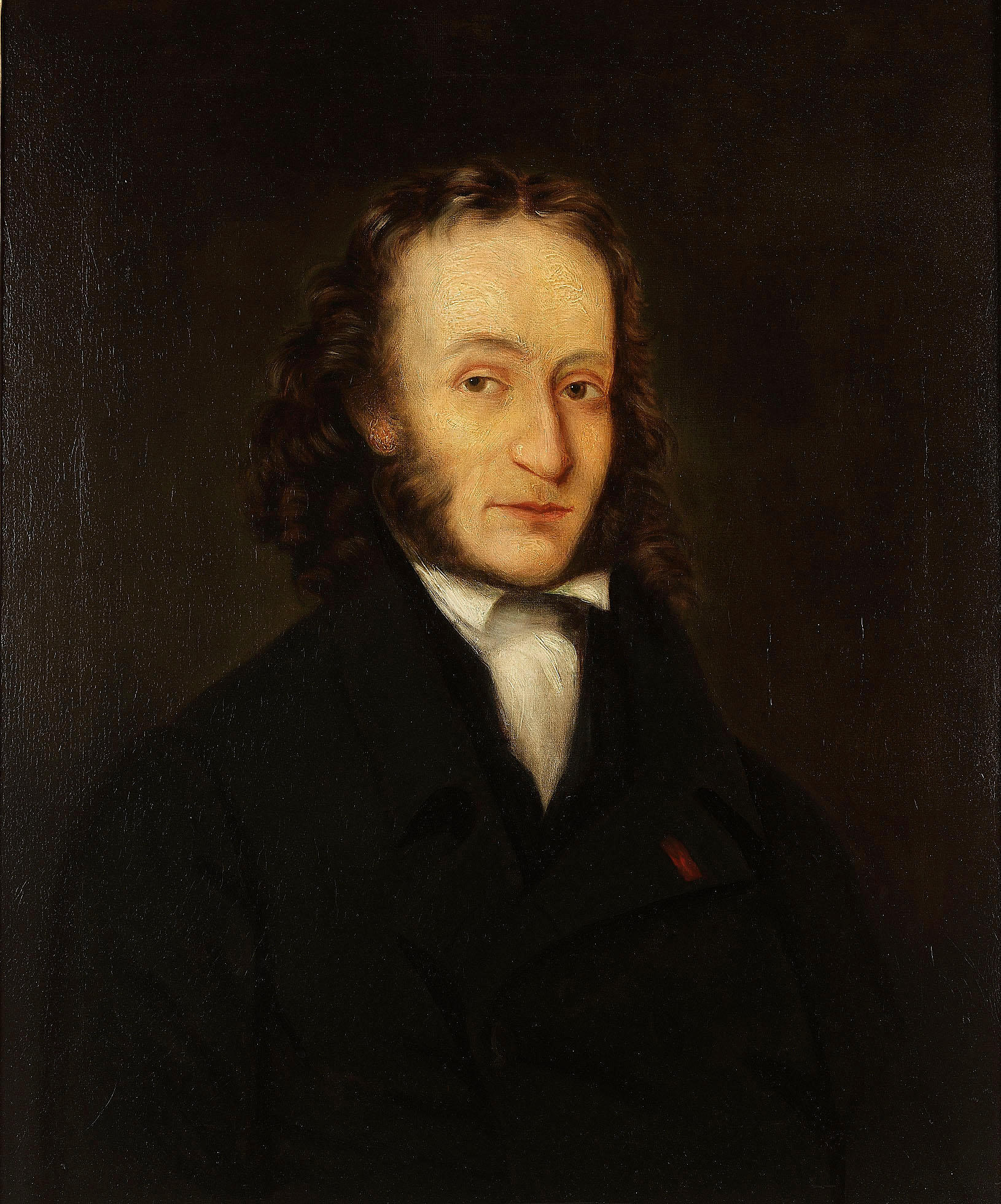
- The composer
- Full title: Sonata with variations in E major based on the theme “Pria ch’io l’impegno” from the opera "L'amor marinaro" by Joseph Weigl
- Catalogue: MS 47
- Year: Circa 1824
- Form: Theme and variations
- Related: Joseph Weigl's L’amor marinaro ossia Il corsaro (1797)
- Published: Vienna - 1922
- Publisher: Universal Edition
- Duration: 10 minutes
- Scoring: Violin and orchestra (published reduction: violin and piano)

The Sonata and Variations in E major on a Theme by Joseph Weigl, MS 47 (Italian: Variazioni sopra un tema di Giuseppe Weigl), also known as Sonata with Variations on "Pria ch'io l'impegno" (Note: The work does not have a single standardized title. Instead, publishers and recordings use slightly different versions of a longer descriptive title, usually referring to it as a Sonata with variations in E major based on the theme “Pria ch’io l’impegno” from the opera "L'amor marinaro" by Joseph Weigl.), is a sonata with variations for violin and orchestra by Genoan composer Niccolò Paganini.

== Background ==
The date of completion of the Sonata (Note: Originally, "Suonata".) with variations is unknown, but musicologists believe it was probably composed in 1824 or shortly before. Paganini was widely known for his public performances rather than for the publication of his compositions. He wrote and frequently performed the Variations, but retained it as part of his personal repertoire instead of publishing it. This work belongs to a larger group of works for violin and orchestra that were preserved only in manuscript and were not widely circulated during his lifetime. Toward the end of his life, after he had largely withdrawn from the stage due in part to declining health, Paganini showed a greater willingness to publish his compositions. Publishers in Paris offered substantial sums of money for works from his catalogue. However, negotiations were unsuccessful due to Paganini's higher financial demands.

Paganini died in 1840. In the years following his death, collectors and publishers began attempting to acquire his manuscripts, either for publication or for private collections. The city of Genoa, his birthplace, declined the opportunity to purchase the manuscript of the Variations. As a result, Wilhelm Heyer of Cologne acquired it in 1911 for his Museum of Music History. The collection obtained by Heyer included numerous manuscripts of unpublished compositions, some of which were incomplete, with missing pages or parts.

One of the earliest known performances of this piece took place at a concert in Genoa's Teatro di Sant'Agostino on May 21, 1824, where a reviewer wrote: “Whoever has not heard him has no idea how completely he commands every aspect of the instrument. Through his absolutely original and brilliant playing, which leans somewhat toward melancholy but is at the same time boisterous and witty, he irresistibly carried the orchestra and audience along with him.” Additional famous performances include the composer's farewell concert in Leipzig in 1829, another concert in Frankfurt in 1830, and several performances in London and Liverpool during his English tour of 1831-32.

The surviving manuscripts were mostly made by copyists, with the exception of the solo violin part, which was written in Paganini’s own hand. Like many of his works, the Variations were first published by Universal Edition in Vienna in 1922. The work appeared only in a version for violin and piano, arranged by Giusto Dacci and edited by Georg Kinsky and Fritz Rothschild.

== Structure ==
The concertante composition is scored for solo violin and an orchestra consisting of a flute, two oboes, two clarinets, a bassoon, two French horns in F, two trumpets in C, a trombone, a serpent, a percussion section consisting of timpani, a bass drum, and cymbals, and a standard string section. As with other “sonatas,” the term sonata is used by the composer in its original sense, meaning simply a “musical piece.” It does not follow the traditional sonata form, but rather takes the form of a theme with variations, preceded by a slow introduction and followed by a presto–stretta finale. The theme is based on a theme from the trio “Pria ch’io l’impegno” (or “Pria che l’impegno”) in the opera L’amor marinaro ossia Il corsaro (1797) by the Austrian composer Joseph Weigl. The opera premiered in Vienna in October 1797, and in 1798 Beethoven used this popular theme for the variation movement of his Clarinet Trio, Op. 11. The piece is structured as follows:

- Introduzione. Adagio
- Thema. Andante moderato (Bar 52)
- Variation I (Bar 76)
- Variation II (Bar 88)
- Variation III. Più mosso (Bar 112)
- Variation IV. Più mosso (Bar 128)
- Variation V. Tempo primo (Bar 144)
- Presto (Bar 159)

The composition is around 10 minutes and 189 bars long. The piece is particularly demanding and displays a wide range of advanced violin techniques. Both the introduction and the second variation are built entirely on double stops in thirds and sixths, and they end with harmonics in thirds (“flautini”), which also appear prominently in the fifth variation. The third variation introduces pizzicato alongside harmonics, while the fourth features saltato. In the final coda, the violinist plays rapid double stops in thirds at a presto tempo.

== Recordings ==
Because the composition was a personal showpiece by Paganini and was not intended to be performed by other musicians, circulation has been scarce. The following is a list of recordings of the composition:

Recordings of Niccolò Paganini's Sonata and Variations in E major on a Theme by Joseph Weigl
Violin	Conductor (or piano)	Orchestra	Date of recording	Place of recording	Label	Notes
Salvatore Accardo	Charles Dutoit	London Philharmonic Orchestra	January 1976	Barking Town Hall, London, UK	Deutsche Grammophon	
Massimo Quarta	Stefania Redaelli (piano)	—	September 1998	Dynamic's, Genoa, Italy	Dynamic	Recording of the 1922 reduction for violin and piano by Giusto Dacci.
Mario Hossen	Martin Kerschbaum	Vienna Classical Players	March 2017	Casino Baumgarten, Vienna, Austria	Dynamic	
