= Nel cor più non mi sento =

1788 operatic duet by Giovanni Paisiello

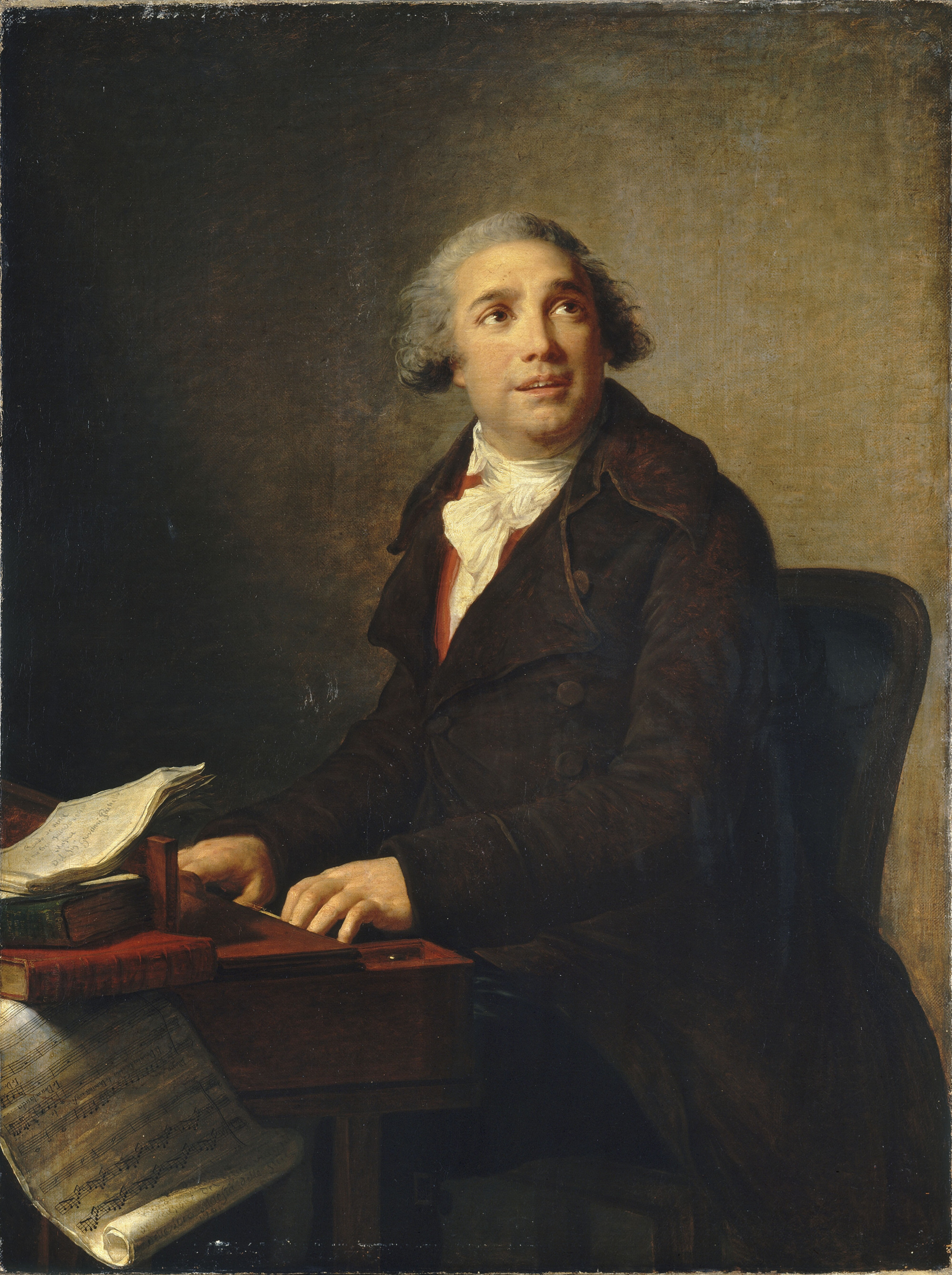
Giovanni Paisiello at the clavichord, by Élisabeth Vigée Le Brun, 1791

"Nel cor più non mi sento" is a duet from Giovanni Paisiello's 1788 opera L'amor contrastato, ossia La molinara, usually known as La molinara (The Miller-Woman). The duet is sung twice in the opera's second act, first by the miller-woman Rachelina (soprano) and Calloandro (tenor) and then by Rachelina and the notary Pistofolo (baritone). The duet is notable as its theme has been used many times as a basis for other musical works, and due to its inclusion in Alessandro Parisotti's 1885 collection Arie Antiche, the song has secured a place in classical vocal pedagogy.

== Music ==
The duet is written in the key of G major with a 6/8 time signature. The voices are accompanied by violins, viola and continuo. There is an eight measure instrumental introduction followed by 20 measures of Rachelina singing the theme. Calloandro repeats these 20 measures with new text before Rachelina joins him for 12 more that repeat half of the theme. The orchestra then concludes the piece with four measures.

After some recitative, Calloandro leaves the stage and Pistofolo appears. The duet is repeated entirely as before, but this time with Pistofolo (who sings an entirely new set of words) rather than Calloandro. Without ornamentation, the range for each singer covers the interval of a minor seventh (from F♯_{4} to E_{5} for Rachelina and F♯_{3} to E_{4} for Calloandro and Pistofolo). The duet would have been ornamented by singers according to the custom of the day.

== Influence ==
Beethoven composed six variations in G major for piano, WoO 70, in 1795. Other composers that have used the theme include Josephine Aurnhammer (6 Variations on 'Nel cor più non mi sento' for harpsichord c.a.1788), Paganini ("Introduction and variations in G major" for violin, Op. 38, MS 44, 1827), Fernando Sor (Fantasie, Op. 16 for guitar 1823), Friedrich Silcher (flute and piano), Mauro Giuliani (guitar and keyboard), Luigi Legnani (Op. 16 for guitar), Giovanni Bottesini (for double bass), Nicola Antonio Manfroce, Johann Nepomuk Hummel, and Johann Baptist Wanhal. There is also a version by Theobald Boehm (Böhm), Nel cor più non mi sento, op. 4 for flute & piano.

== Lyrics ==
Rachelina:
Nel cor più non mi sento
brillar la gioventù.
Cagion del mio tormento,
Amor, ci hai colpa tu.
Mi stuzzichi, mi mastichi,
mi pungichi, mi pizzichi;
Che cosa è questa oimè?
Pietà, pietà, pietà!
Amore è un certo che,
che disperar mi fa!

Calloandro:
Ti sento, sì ti sento,
bel fior di gioventù.
Cagion del mio tormento,
anima mia sei tu.
Mi stuzzichi, mi mastichi,
mi pungichi, mi pizzichi;
Che cosa è questa oimè?
Pietà, pietà, pietà!
Quel viso è un certo che,
che delirar mi fa.

Il Notaro (Pistofolo):
Bandiera d'ogni vento,
conosco chi sei tu
Da uno sino a cento,
burli la gioventù.
Tu stuzzichi, tu mastichi,
tu pungichi, tu pizzichi;
Che grida ognuno: oimè!
Pietà, pietà, pietà!
La donna è un certo che,
che abbrustolir mi fa.

In my heart I no more feel
the sparkle of youth.
The cause of my torment,
o Love, it is your fault.
You tease me, you bite me,
you prick me, you pinch me.
What is this thing in me!
Pity, pity, pity!
Love is a certain something,
which makes me despair.

I hear you, yes I hear you,
beautiful flower of youth.
The cause of my torment,
o my soul, it is you.
You tease me, you bite me,
you prick me, you pinch me.
What is this thing, alas!
Pity, pity, pity!
That face is one
which makes me delirious.

A flag to every wind,
I know this is you:
From one to a hundred
you are making fun of youth.
You tease, you bite,
you prick, you pinch.
So everyone cries: alas!
Pity, pity, pity!
That woman is the one
burning me.

== Arie Antiche ==
When Alessandro Parisotti included this work in his collection of Arie Antiche (1885), he created a solo version by including only the first 28 measures of the duet. He also changed the key to F major and added ornaments without preserving the original melody. The song was later included in G. Schirmer's Twenty-Four Italian Songs and Arias. It is in this form that the duet has become familiar to modern audiences. In concert, it is typically repeated with the repeat being more heavily ornamented.
