= Le streghe (Paganini) =

- Theme and variations
- by Niccolò Paganini
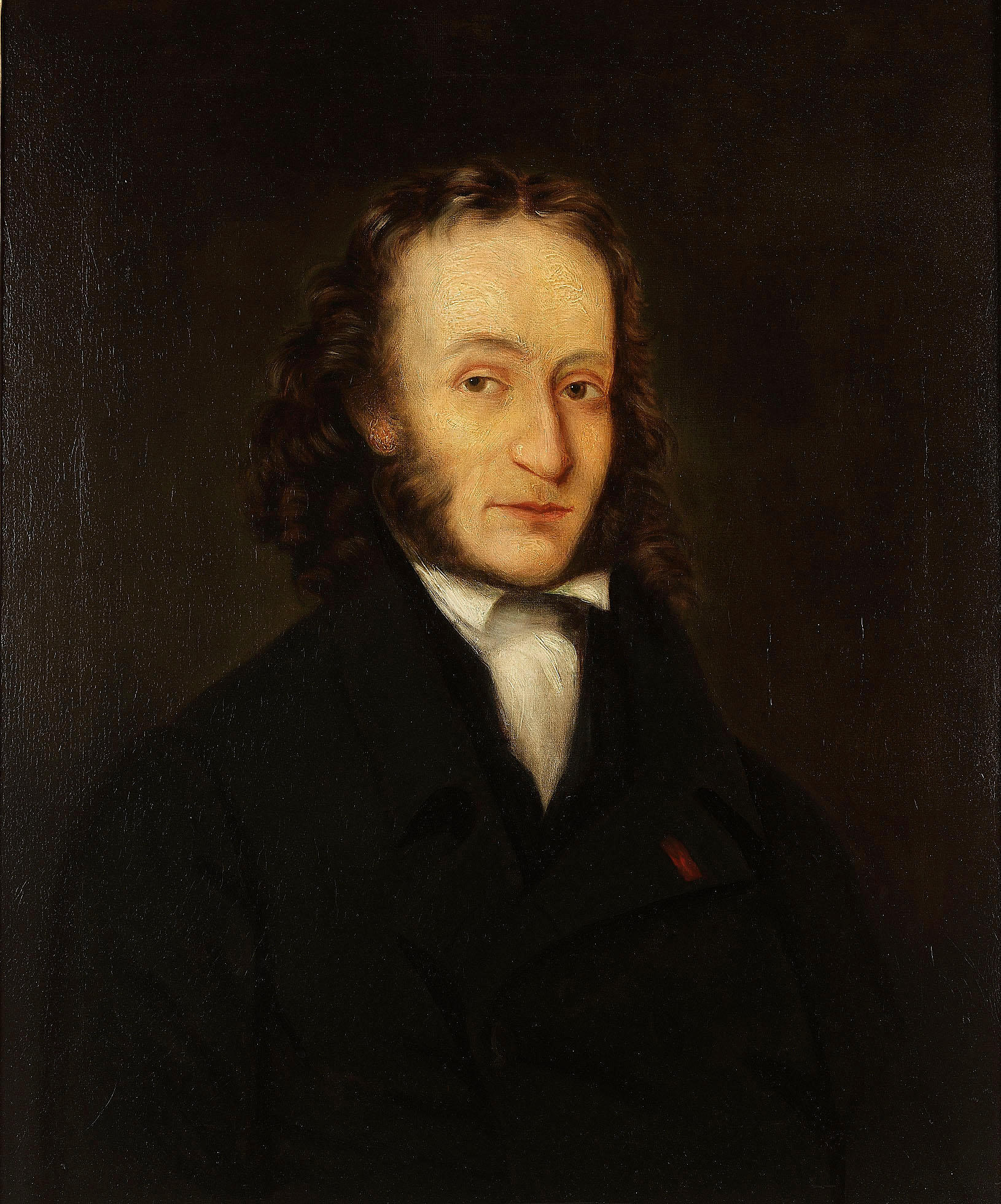
- The composer
- Key: E♭ major
- Catalogue: MS 17
- Opus: Op. 8
- Year: 1813
- Related: Franz Xaver Süssmayr's Il noce di Benevento
- Duration: 10 minutes
- Scoring: Violin and orchestra

Le streghe, Op. 8, MS 17 (from Italian, The Witches), also translated into English as Witches' Dance, is a short composition for violin and orchestra by Italian virtuoso Niccolò Paganini. Finished in 1813, it was one of Paganini's most appreciated unpublished works.

== Background ==
Le streghe was composed in 1813 after Niccolò Paganini attended a 1813 performance of the ballet Il noce di Benevento (1812), choreographed by Salvatore Viganò to music by Franz Xaver Süssmayr, who was best known for completing Mozart’s Requiem (1791). Paganini completed the work in 1813 and premiered it at La Scala on October 29, 1813 with the La Scala Orchestra. After a highly successful premiere, it became a regular feature of his concerts and one of his most popular pieces, remaining in his repertoire until he retired due to poor health in the 1830s. Despite its popularity, Paganini was highly protective of his concert works and did not allow them to be published during his lifetime, demanding very large sums for their release at the end of his life. By the time of his death in 1840, only five opus numbers had been published.

Shortly after his death, manuscripts began circulating among publishers and collectors, and many works were either published or remained in private collections well into the 20th century. In 1851, the publishing houses of Schönenberger in Paris and Schott Music in Mainz issued a set of nine previously unpublished works, among them Le streghe (listed as No. 3 in the series of posthumous works). Unlike many other posthumous publications, it was issued in full score with orchestration.

Notably, Le streghe was included as the closing piece of Otakar Ševčík's School of Interpretation for the Violin, Op. 16 (1932), part of his broader violin method. This collection brought together many famously challenging works, providing detailed fingering, an expanded edition, and additional exercises to address specific technical passages. The piece was issued with a piano reduction of the orchestral accompaniment.

== Structure ==
Le streghe is a concertante piece scored for a solo violin and an orchestra consisting of two flutes, two oboes, two clarinets, a bassoon, two French horns, two trumpets, three trombones, timpani, a bass drum, cymbals, and a standard string section. It has a duration of around 10 minutes. It is structured as follows:

- Introduction. Maestoso - Larghetto
- Theme. Andantino, meno mosso (or Andante)
- Variation I
- Variation II
- Variation III
- Finale. Allegretto

The piece is in E♭ major. The solo violin uses scordatura, with each string tuned a semitone higher (to A♭, E♭, B♭, and F), making it easier to navigate passages using open strings.

== Recordings ==
The following is a list of recordings of Paganini's Le streghe:

Recordings of Le streghe, Op. 8, MS 19, by NIccolò Paganini
Violin	Conductor (or piano)	Orchestra	Date of recording	Place of recording	Record label	Notes
Giulio Bignami	Sandra Fuga	—	April 1937	Genoa, Italy	Dynamic	
Salvatore Accardo	Charles Dutoit	London Symphony Orchestra	April 1975	Barking Town Hall, London, UK	Deutsche Grammophon	
Stefan Milenkovich	Massimo Paderni	—	June 1996	Dynamic's, Genoa, Italy	Dynamic	
Rachel Barton	Patrick Sinozich	—	July 1998	WFMT, Chicago, Illinois, USA	Cedille	
Massimo Quarta	Stefania Redaelli	—	September 1998	Dynamic's, Genoa, Italy	Dynamic	
Philippe Quint	Dmitri Kogan	—	June 2008	Glenn Gould Studio, CBC, Toronto, Ontario, Canada	Naxos	
Benjamin Schmid	Lisa Smirnova	—	September 2011	Wallfahrtskirche Maria Fallsbach, Gunskirchen, Austria	Oehms Classics	
Luca Fanfoni	Luca Ballerini	—	November 2012	BartokStudio, Bernareggio, Italy	Dynamic	
Mario Hossen	Martin Kerschbaum	Vienna Classical Players	March 2017	Casino Baumgarten, Vienna, Austria	Dynamic	

== Reception ==
Le streghe was very well received during Paganini's lifetime. It was in his personal repertoire since its premiere and was performed very frequently. A review in the Gazzetta di Genova of one of the earliest known performances remarked: "This man is so extraordinary throughout, and has learned the harmony of the angels in heaven, that of birds in the air, from the terrain of men to the Witches from the Noce of Benevento, and will not rest until he leads us to hell to tell us about devils better than Tasso, Dante, Virgil, Orpheus, all of [whom] he has already exceeded with his miraculous violin." British critic Leigh Hunt was similarly enthusiastic, and wrote that, with Le streghe, he had "dropped the clownish and tastelessly grotesque, [...] raised the imitative effect to a higher level and incorporated it in a diabolically difficult and time-resisting work that remained one of the most admired and sensational numbers of his repertory." Because of his exceptional dexterity and technical mastery, he was nicknamed "Hexensohn" (son of the witches) or "Hexenmeister" (witch master) in his 1829 concerts in Berlin, in reference to the title of this piece.
