= Maestosa sonata sentimentale =

- Variazioni sull'inno nazionale austriaco
- by Niccolò Paganini
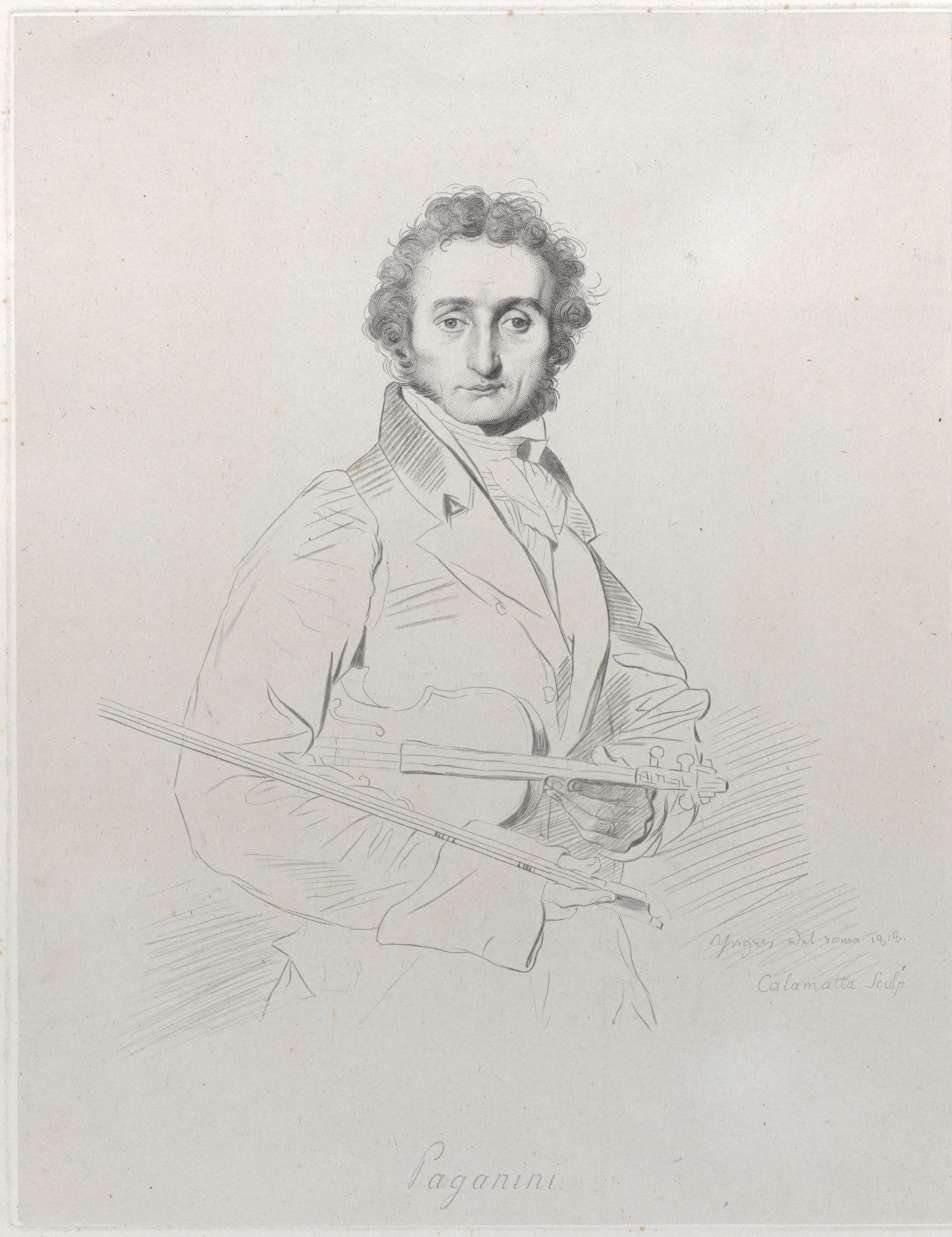
- Niccolò Paganini
- Key: E♭ major
- Catalogue: MS 51
- Year: 1828
- Duration: 15 minutes
- Scoring: Violin and orchestra

Maestosa sonata sentimentale, MS 51, originally and alternatively entitled Maestosa suonata sentimentale and sometimes subtitled Variazioni sull'inno nazionale austriaco (from Italian, "Variations on the Austrian national anthem"), is a sonata with variations composed by Italian composer Niccolò Paganini. Completed in 1828, it is notable because the solo violin part only uses the fourth string.

== Background ==
At the time Niccolò Paganini wrote the Maestosa sonata sentimentale, it was customary for Paganini to include a piece performed entirely on the fourth string in their programs, as a way of showcasing their technical skill. During his European tour, Paganini composed around half a dozen such works, of which the Maestosa sonata sentimentale is among the most notable. The piece was written in May and June 1828, specifically for his Viennese audience, and was premiered on June 27, 1828 at the Vienna Hoftheater. The event was attended by Emperor Francis I of Austria.

Like many of Niccolò Paganini’s works, the piece was never published during his lifetime and remained in manuscript form for a long time. One manuscript of a full score and complete set of orchestral parts, along with a reduction for violin and piano, is preserved at the Biblioteca Casanatense. In this set, only the French horn and double bass parts are autograph, while the remaining parts were copied by other hands. A modern typeset edition of the score was published in Rome in 1994 by Boccaccini & Spada Editori, revised by Vincenzo Bolognese.

== Structure ==
This composition is nominally described as a sonata; however, like many works by Niccolò Paganini, it is in fact a concertante piece that loosely follows a theme-and-variations structure. It is based on the theme "Gott erhalte Franz den Kaiser" by Joseph Haydn, originally written in honor of Emperor Francis I of Austria and used at the time as the Austrian imperial anthem. The work is scored for violin and orchestra, although Paganini’s own reduction for violin and piano is also frequently performed.

The piece is particularly notable for being written entirely for the violin’s lowest string (the G string). In order to reach higher pitches beyond the natural range of that string, the performer frequently employs harmonics. Moreover, the string is retuned to B♭, three semitones higher than its usual pitch,so that, although the violin part is written in C major, the sounding key is E♭ major.

The piece has an approximate duration of 15 minutes and consists of 243 bars. The following is a breakdown of its sections:

- Introduction. Maestoso
- Allegro agitato (bar 52)
- Inno. Andante, larghetto cantabile (bar 138)
- Variazione I (bar 158)
- Variazione II. Più mosso (bar 181)
- Variazione III. Più lento (bar 202)
- Variazione IV. Allegro vivace (bar 223)

== Recordings ==
Because the piece circulation was scarce, as there were only manuscripts available until very recently, it has not been recorded very often. Violinist Salvatore Accardo with conductor Charles Dutoit and the London Philharmonic Orchestra recorded the piece for Deutsche Grammophon in January 1976 at Barking Town Hall, London. Another performance was recorded by violinist Mario Hossen with Nayden Todorov conducting the Camerata Orphica. The recording was released under the Dynamic label in 2018. Violinist Massimo Quarta and pianist Stefania Redaelli also recorded the world premiere recording of the violin and piano arrangement made by Paganini. It was recorded in September 1998 at the Dynamic Studio, Genoa, Italy, and was also released by the Dynamic label in 1999.
