= Giovanni Paisiello =

Italian Classical era composer (1740–1816)

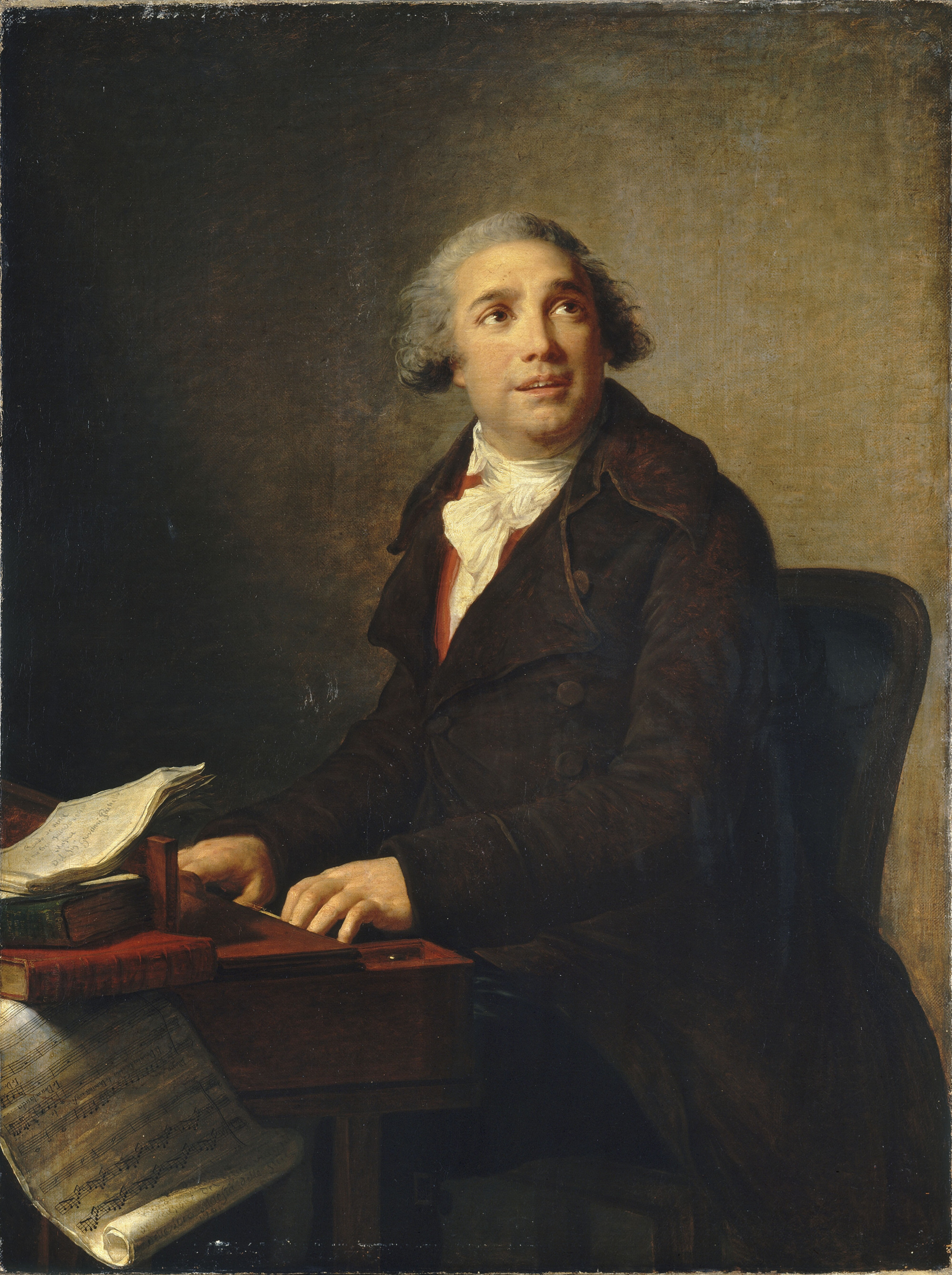
- Paisiello at the clavichord (1791)
- Born: 9 May 1740; Taranto, Kingdom of Naples
- Died: 5 June 1816 (aged 76); Naples, Kingdom of Naples
- Occupation: Composer

Giovanni Paisiello (or Paesiello; 9 May 1740 – 5 June 1816) was an Italian composer of the Classical era, and was the most popular opera composer of the late 1700s. His operatic style influenced Mozart and Rossini.

== Life ==
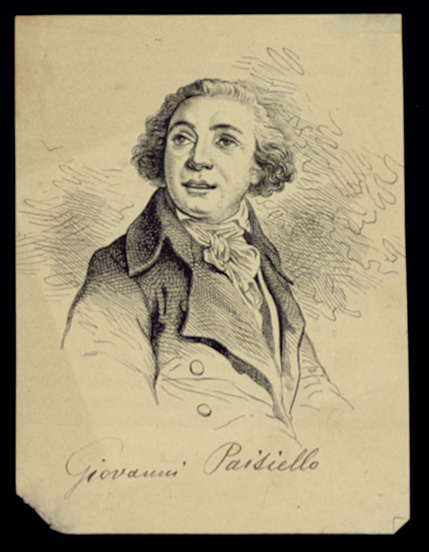
Portrait of Paisiello

Paisiello was born in Taranto, in the modern Apulia region, and educated by the Jesuits there. He became known for his beautiful singing voice and in 1754 was sent to the Conservatorio di S. Onofrio at Naples, where he studied under Francesco Durante, and eventually became assistant master. For the theatre of the Conservatorio, which he left in 1763, he wrote some intermezzi, one of which attracted so much notice that he was invited to write two operas, La Pupilla and Il Mondo al Rovescio, for Bologna, and a third, Il Marchese di Tidipano, for Rome.

His reputation now firmly established, he settled for some years at Naples, where, despite the popularity of Niccolò Piccinni, Domenico Cimarosa and Pietro Guglielmi, of whose triumphs he was bitterly jealous, he produced a series of highly successful operas, one of which, L'idolo cinese, made a deep impression upon the Neapolitan public. The young Mozart and his father met him in Naples in 1771.

In 1772, Paisiello began to write church music and composed a requiem for Gennara di Borbone, of the reigning dynasty. In the same year, he married Cecilia Pallini, and the marriage was a happy one. In 1776, Paisiello was invited by the empress Catherine the Great of Russia to Saint Petersburg, where he remained for eight years, producing, among other charming works, his masterpiece, Il barbiere di Siviglia, which soon attained a European reputation. The fate of this opera marks an epoch in the history of Italian art; for with it the gentle suavity cultivated by the masters of the 18th century died out to make room for the dazzling brilliance of a later period.

When, in 1816, Gioachino Rossini set another version of the libretto by Cesare Sterbini under the title of Almaviva o sia l'inutile precauzione the fans of Paisiello stormed the stage. Rossini's opera, now known as Il barbiere di Siviglia, is now acknowledged as Rossini's greatest work, while Paisiello's opera is only infrequently produced—a strange instance of poetical vengeance since Paisiello himself had many years previously endeavoured to eclipse the fame of Giovanni Battista Pergolesi by resetting the libretto of his famous intermezzo, La serva padrona.

Paisiello left Russia in 1784, and, after producing Il Re Teodoro at Vienna, entered the service of Ferdinand IV of Naples, where he composed many of his best operas, including Nina and La Molinara.

The Irish tenor Michael Kelly witnessed another meeting between Paisiello and Mozart when he visited Vienna later that year. Mozart had just finished a string of piano concertos, K. 449 and 453, written for his pupil Barbara Ployer. When Ployer's father arranged a performance at his summer estate in Döbling, Mozart wrote to his father, "Fräulein Babette will play her new concerto in G and I shall play the Quintet and then we'll perform together the grand sonata for two pianos. I shall fetch Paisiello with my carriage for I want him to hear my compositions as well as my pupil."

After many vicissitudes, resulting from political and dynastic changes, he was invited to Paris (1802) by Napoleon, whose favour he had won five years previously by composing a march for the funeral of General Hoche. Napoleon treated him munificently, while cruelly neglecting two more famous composers, Luigi Cherubini and Étienne Méhul, to whom the new favourite transferred the hatred he had formerly borne to Cimarosa, Guglielmi and Piccinni.

Paisiello conducted the music of the court in the Tuileries with a stipend of 10,000 francs and 4,800 for lodging, but he entirely failed to conciliate the Parisian public, who received his opera Proserpine so coldly that, in 1803, he requested and with some difficulty obtained permission to return to Italy, upon the plea of his wife's ill health. On his arrival at Naples Paisiello was reinstated in his former appointments by Joseph Bonaparte and Joachim Murat, but he had taxed his genius beyond its strength and was unable to meet the demands now made upon it for new ideas. His prospects, too, were precarious. The power of the Bonaparte family was tottering to its fall, and Paisiello's fortunes fell with it. The death of his wife in 1815 tried him severely. His health failed rapidly, and constitutional jealousy of the popularity of others was a source of worry and vexation.

Paisiello is known to have composed 94 operas, which are known for their gracefully beautiful melodies. Perhaps the best-known tune he ever wrote is "Nel cor più non mi sento" from La Molinara, immortalized when Beethoven composed piano variations based on it. Paganini also wrote violin variations based on the same tune. Another favourite vocal piece is "Chi vuol la zingarella" from I zingari in fiera, which vividly portrays the scene of an attractive gypsy girl with its dramatic music. Paisiello also wrote a great deal of church music, including eight masses; as well as fifty-one instrumental compositions and many stand-alone songs. He also composed the Inno al Re, the national anthem of the Kingdom of the Two Sicilies. Manuscript scores of many of his operas were presented to the library of the British Museum by Domenico Dragonetti.

The library of the Girolamini at Naples possesses an interesting manuscript compilation recording Paisiello's opinions on contemporary composers, and exhibiting him as a somewhat severe critic, especially of the work of Pergolesi.

The Grove Concise Dictionary of Music notes that "Paisiello was one of the most successful and influential opera composers of his time. Most of his over 80 operas are comic and use a simple, direct and spirited style, latterly with sharper characterization, more colourful scoring and warmer melodies (features that influenced Mozart). His serious operas have less than the conventional amount of virtuoso vocal writing; those for Russia are the closest to Gluck's 'reform' approach.

== Works ==
Paisiello composed 94 operas, including Il barbiere di Siviglia (1782), La molinara (1788), and Nina, o sia la pazza per amore (1789). His works include both comic and serious operas, masses, oratorios, secular and sacred cantatas, keyboard sonatas, concertos, symphonies, and chamber music.

== Editions ==
- Stefano Faglia, Franca Saini (ed.): Il Mondo della Luna, Saint Petersburg, 1783. Monza, Accademia Musicale IAMR, 2006. Parma, L'oca del Cairo Edizioni Musicali, 2006.
