= Niccolò Paganini =

Italian violinist and composer (1782–1840)

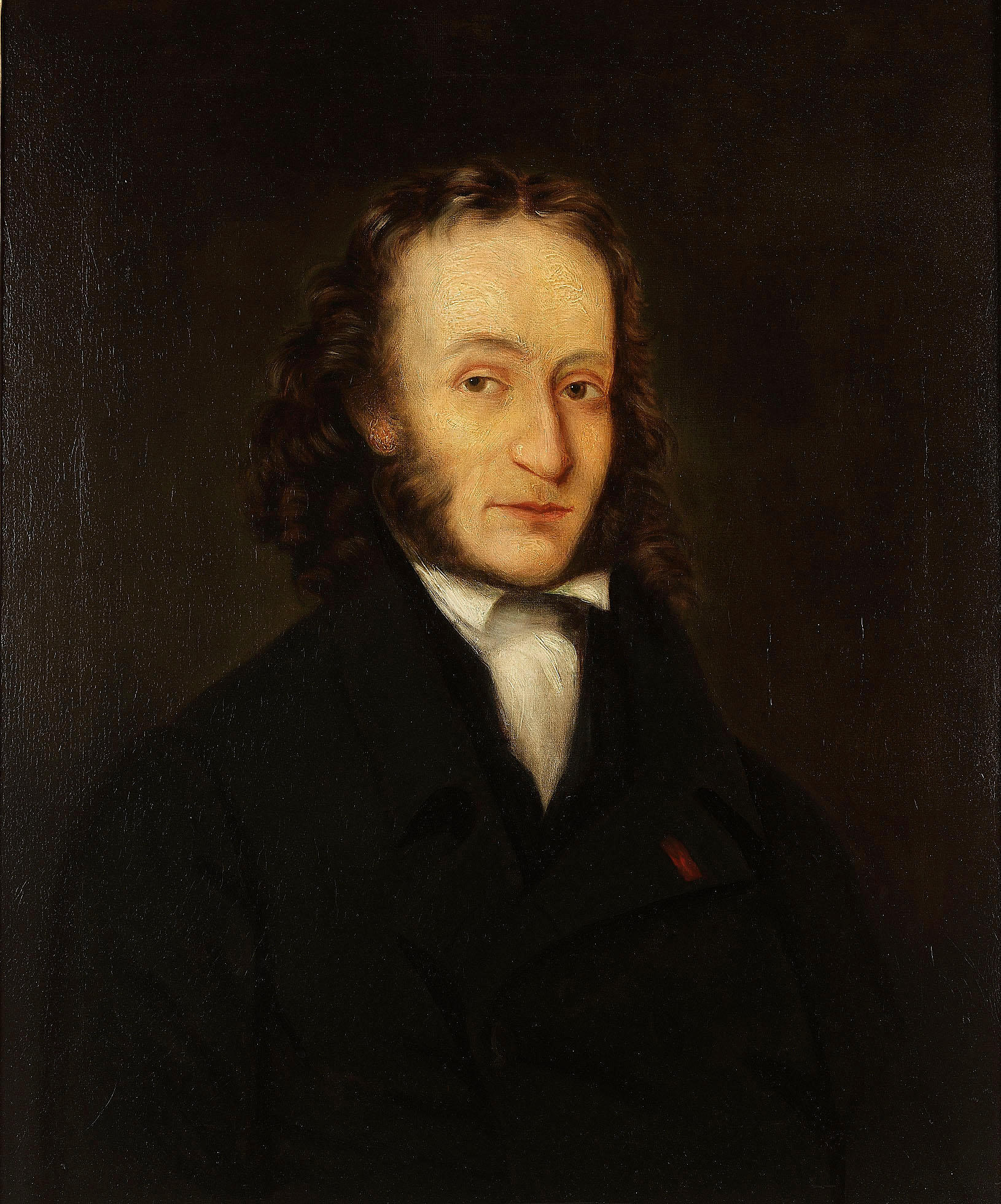
- Paganini in 1836
- Born: 27 October 1782; Genoa, Republic of Genoa
- Died: 27 May 1840 (aged 57); Nice, Kingdom of Sardinia
- Occupations: Violinist; guitarist; composer
- Works: List of compositions
- Awards: Order of the Golden Spur

Signature
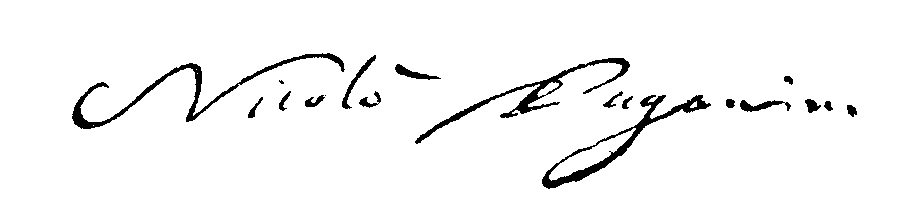

Niccolò (or Nicolò) Paganini (/pæɡəˈniːni, pɑːɡə-/; Italian: [ni(k)koˈlɔ ppaɡaˈniːni]; 27 October 1782 – 27 May 1840) was an Italian violinist, guitarist and composer. He was the most celebrated violin virtuoso of his time, and left his mark as one of the pillars of modern violin technique. His 24 Caprices for Solo Violin Op. 1 are among the best known of his compositions.

Son of a ship chandler from Genoa, Paganini showed a gift for music from an early age and studied under Alessandro Rolla, Ferdinando Paer and Gasparo Ghiretti. Accompanied by his father, he toured northern Italy extensively as a teenager. By 1805 he had come into the service of Napoleon's sister, Elisa Bonaparte, who then ruled Lucca where Paganini was first to play violin. From 1809 on he returned to touring and achieved continental fame in the subsequent two and a half decades, developing a reputation for his technical brilliance and showmanship, as well as his extravagant, philandering lifestyle. Paganini ended his concert career in 1834 amid declining health, and the failure of his Paris casino left him in financial ruin. He retired and died in Nice (at that time still part of the Kingdom of Sardinia) in 1840 at the age of 57.

== Biography ==
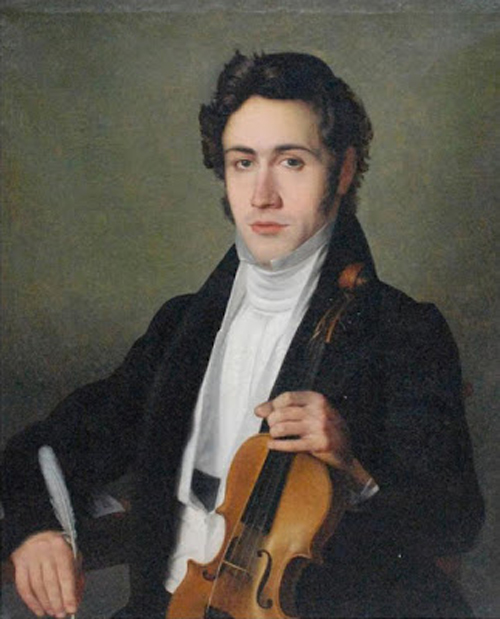
Possible portrait of a young Paganini

=== Childhood ===
Niccolò Paganini was born in Genoa (then capital of the Republic of Genoa) on 27 October 1782, as the third of the six children of Antonio and Teresa (née Bocciardo) Paganini. Antonio Paganini was an unsuccessful ship chandler, but he managed to supplement his income by working as a musician and by selling mandolins. At the age of five, Paganini started learning the mandolin from his father and moved to the violin by the age of seven. His musical talents were quickly recognized, earning him numerous scholarships for violin lessons. The young Paganini studied under various local violinists, including Giovanni Servetto and Giacomo Costa, but his progress quickly outpaced their abilities. Paganini and his father then traveled to Parma to seek further guidance from Alessandro Rolla. But upon listening to Paganini's playing, Rolla immediately referred him to his own teacher, Ferdinando Paer and, later, Paer's own teacher, Gasparo Ghiretti.

=== Early career ===
The French invaded northern Italy in March 1796, and the political situation in Genoa became unstable. The Paganinis sought refuge in their country property in Romairone, near Bolzaneto. It was in this period that Paganini is thought to have developed his relationship with the guitar. He mastered the guitar, but preferred to play it in exclusively intimate, rather than public concerts. He later described the guitar as his "constant companion" on his concert tours. By 1800, Paganini and his father traveled to Livorno, where Paganini played in concerts and his father resumed his maritime work. In 1801, the 18-year-old Paganini was appointed first violin of the Republic of Lucca, but a substantial portion of his income came from freelancing. His fame as a violinist was matched only by his reputation as a gambler and philanderer.

In 1805, Lucca was annexed by Napoleonic France, and the region was ceded to Napoleon's sister, Elisa Bonaparte. Paganini became a violinist for the Baciocchi court, while giving private lessons to Elisa's husband, Felice for ten years. During this time, his wife and Paganini were also carrying on a romantic affair. In 1807, Baciocchi became the Grand Duchess of Tuscany and her court was transferred to Florence. Paganini was part of the entourage but, towards the end of 1809, he left Baciocchi to resume his freelance career.

=== Travelling virtuoso ===
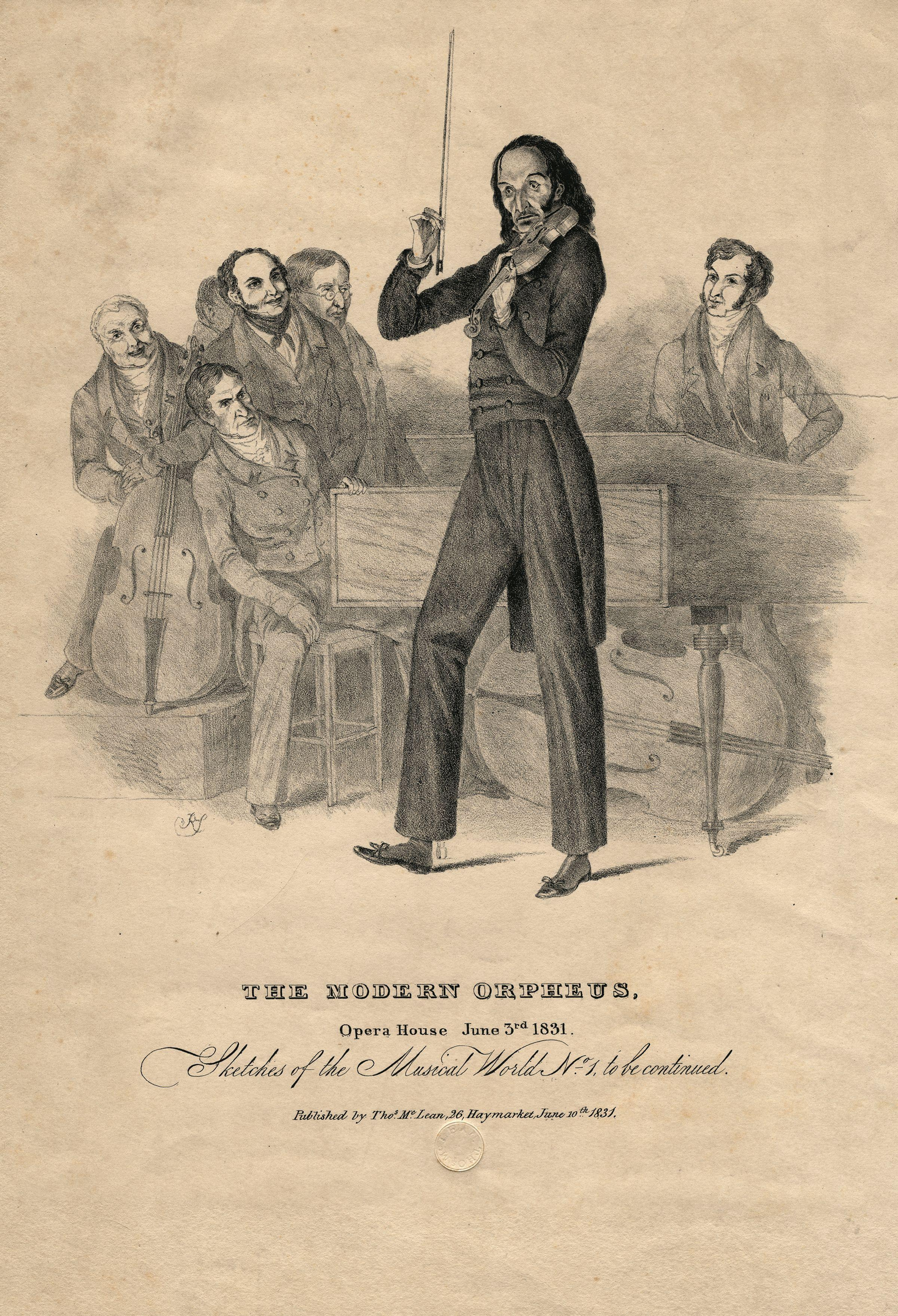
1831 bulletin advertising a performance of Paganini

For the next few years, Paganini returned to touring in the areas surrounding Parma and Genoa. Though he was very popular with the local audience, he was still not very well known in the rest of Europe. His first break came from an 1813 concert at La Scala in Milan. The concert was a great success. As a result, Paganini began to attract the attention of other prominent, though more conservative, musicians across Europe. His early encounters with Charles Philippe Lafont and Louis Spohr created intense rivalry.

In 1827, Pope Leo XII honoured Paganini with the Order of the Golden Spur. His fame spread across Europe with a concert tour that started in Vienna in August 1828, stopping in every major European city in Germany, Poland, and Bohemia until February 1831 in Strasbourg. This was followed by tours in Paris and Britain. His technical ability and his willingness to display it received much critical acclaim. In addition to his own compositions, theme and variations being the most popular, Paganini also performed modified versions of works (primarily concertos) written by his early contemporaries, such as Rodolphe Kreutzer and Giovanni Battista Viotti.

Paganini's travels also brought him into contact with eminent guitar virtuosi of the day, including Ferdinando Carulli in Paris and Mauro Giuliani in Vienna.

=== Late career and health decline ===
Throughout his life, Paganini was no stranger to chronic illnesses. Although no definite medical proof exists, it has been later theorized that he might have been affected by Marfan syndrome or Ehlers–Danlos syndrome. His frequent concert schedule, as well as his extravagant lifestyle, may have affected his health. Paganini was diagnosed with syphilis as early as 1822, and his remedy, which included mercury and opium, came with serious physical and psychological side effects. In 1834, while still in Paris, he was treated for tuberculosis.

In September 1834, Paganini put an end to his concert career and returned to Genoa. Contrary to popular beliefs involving his wishing to keep his music and techniques secret, Paganini devoted his time to the publication of his compositions and violin methods. He accepted students, of whom two enjoyed moderate success: violinist Camillo Sivori and cellist Gaetano Ciandelli. Neither, however, considered Paganini helpful or inspirational. In 1835, Paganini returned to Parma, this time under the employ of Archduchess Marie Louise of Austria, Napoleon's second wife. He was in charge of reorganizing her court orchestra, but he eventually conflicted with the players and court, so his visions never saw completion. In Paris, he befriended the 11-year-old Polish virtuoso Apollinaire de Kontski, giving him some lessons and a signed testimonial. It was widely put about, falsely, that Paganini was so impressed with de Kontski's skills that he bequeathed him his violins and manuscripts.

=== Final years, death, and burial ===
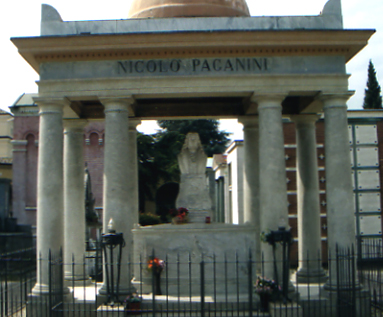
Tomb of Paganini in Parma, Italy

In 1836, Paganini returned to Paris to set up a casino. Its immediate failure left him in financial ruin, and he auctioned off his personal effects, including his musical instruments, to recoup his losses. At Christmas of 1838, he left Paris for Marseille and, after a brief stay, traveled to Nice where his condition worsened. In May 1840, the Bishop of Nice sent Paganini a local parish priest to perform the last rites. Paganini assumed the sacrament was premature, and refused.

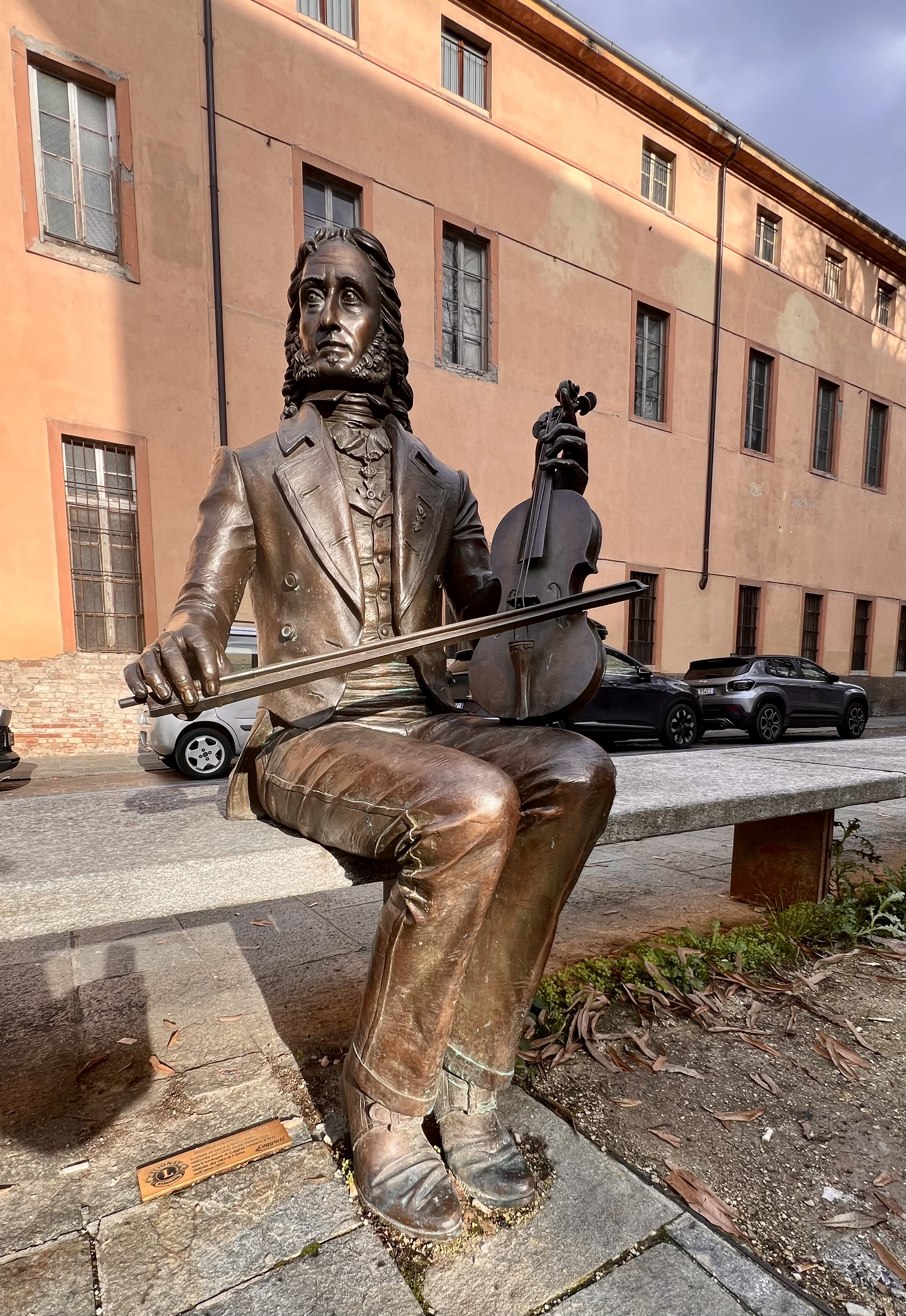
Sculpture of Niccolò Paganini in a park in Parma, Italy

A week later, on 27 May 1840, the 57-year-old Paganini died from internal hemorrhaging before a priest could be summoned. Because of this, and his widely rumored association with the devil, the Church denied his body a Catholic burial in Genoa. It took four years and an appeal to the Pope before the Church let his body be transported to Genoa, but it was still not buried. His body was finally buried in 1876, in a cemetery in Parma. In 1893, the Czech violinist František Ondříček persuaded Paganini's grandson, Attila, to allow a viewing of the violinist's body. After this episode, Paganini's body was finally reinterred in a new cemetery in Parma in 1896.

== Personal life ==
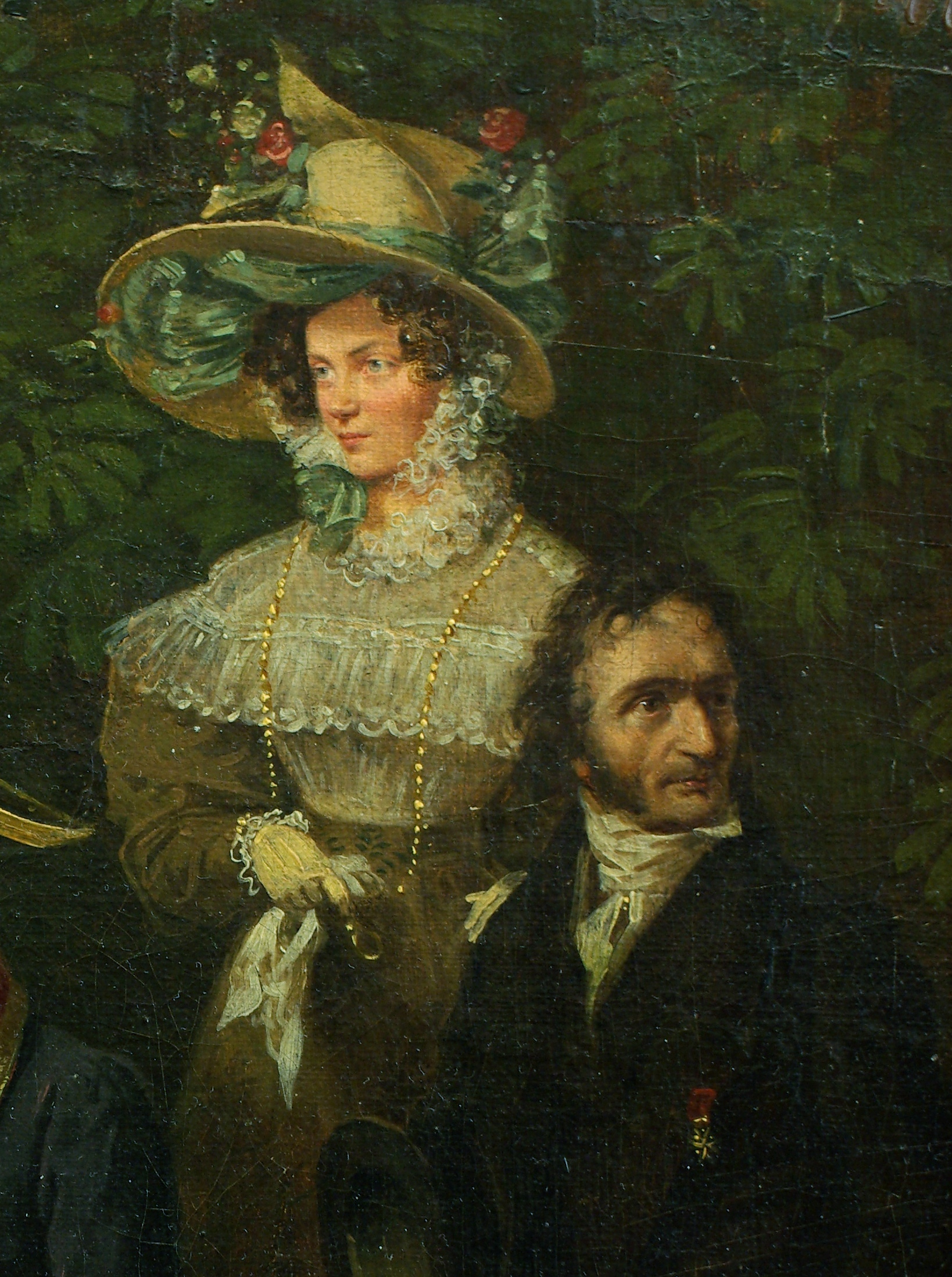
Henriette Sontag and Niccolò Paganini. Detail of Parade on Opernplatz in 1822 by Franz Krüger

Though having no shortage of romantic relations, Paganini was seriously involved with a singer named Antonia Bianchi from Como, whom he met in Milan in 1813. The two gave concerts together throughout Italy. They had a son, Achille Ciro Alessandro, born on 23 July 1825 in Palermo and baptized at San Bartolomeo's. They never legalized their union and it ended around April 1828 in Vienna. Paganini brought Achille on his European tours, and Achille later accompanied his father until the latter's death.

Throughout his career, Paganini also became close friends with composers Gioachino Rossini and Hector Berlioz. Rossini and Paganini met in Bologna in the summer of 1818. In January 1821, on his return from Naples, Paganini met Rossini again in Rome, just in time to become the substitute conductor for Rossini's opera Matilde di Shabran, upon the sudden death of the original conductor. Paganini's efforts earned great gratitude from Rossini.

Paganini met Berlioz in Paris in 1833 and they continued to correspond. He commissioned a piece from the composer, but was not satisfied with the resultant four-movement piece for orchestra and viola obbligato, Harold en Italie. He never performed it; instead, it was premiered a year later by violist Christian Urhan. He did, however, write his own Sonata per Gran Viola Op. 35 (with orchestra or guitar accompaniment). Despite his alleged lack of interest in Harold, Paganini often referred to Berlioz as the resurrection of Beethoven and, towards the end of his life, he gave large sums to the composer. They shared an active interest in the guitar, which they both played and used in compositions. Paganini gave Berlioz a guitar, which they both signed on its sound box.

== Playing style ==
=== Instruments ===
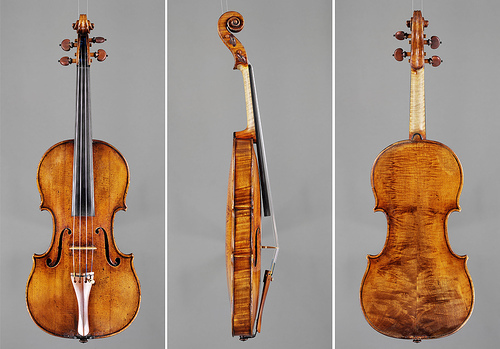
Views of the Hubay 1726 Stradivari

Paganini was in possession of a number of fine stringed instruments, including 11 Stradivari at the time of his death. More legendary than these were the circumstances under which he obtained (and lost) some of them. While Paganini was still a teenager in Livorno, a wealthy businessman named Livron lent him a violin, made by the master luthier Giuseppe Guarneri, for a concert. Livron was so impressed with Paganini's playing that he refused to take it back. This particular violin came to be known as Il Cannone Guarnerius ("The Cannon of Guarnieri") because of its powerful voice and resonance.

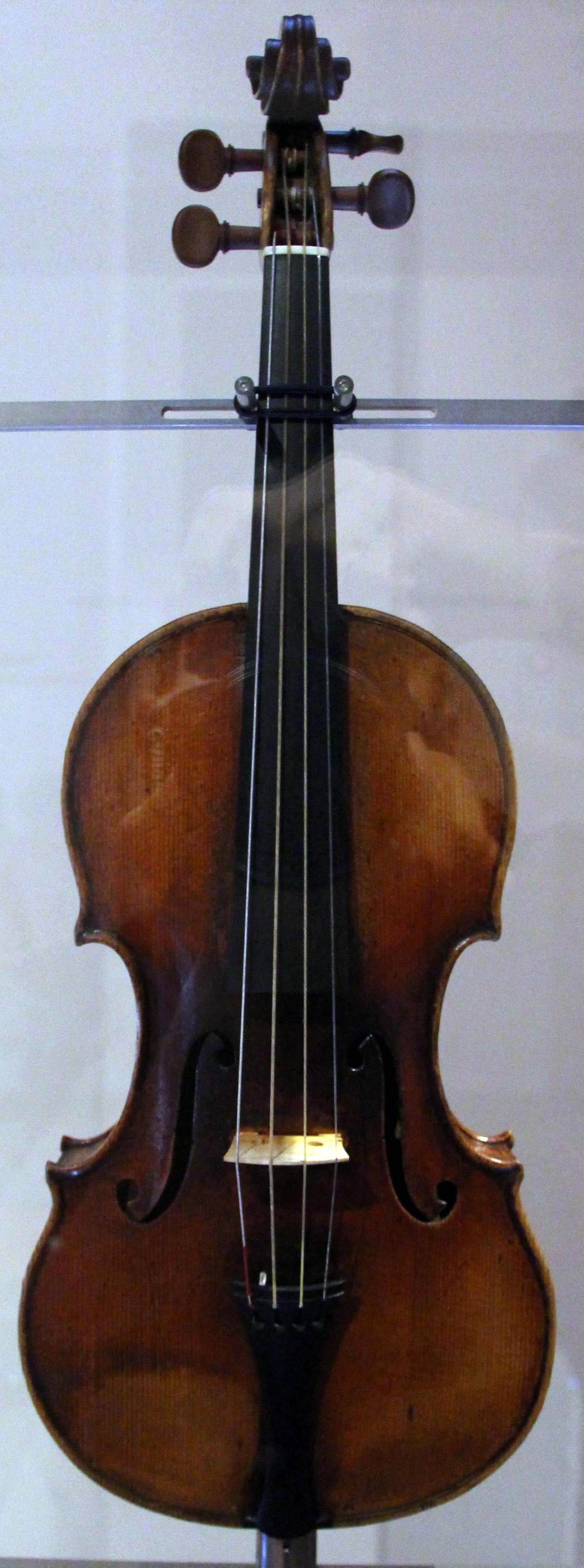
Il Cannone Guarnerius on exhibit at the Palazzo Doria-Tursi in Genoa, Italy

Other instruments associated with Paganini include the Antonio Amati 1600, the Nicolò Amati 1657, the Paganini-Desaint 1680 Stradivari, the Guarneri-filius Andrea 1706, the Le Brun 1712 Stradivari, the Vuillaume c. 1720 Bergonzi, the Hubay 1726 Stradivari, and the Comte Cozio di Salabue 1727 violins; the Countess of Flanders 1582 da Salò-di Bertolotti, and the Mendelssohn 1731 Stradivari violas; the Piatti 1700 Goffriller, the Stanlein 1707 Stradivari, and the Ladenburg 1736 Stradivari cellos; and the Grobert of Mirecourt 1820 (guitar).

Of his guitars, there is little evidence remaining of his various choices of instrument. The aforementioned guitar that he gave to Berlioz is a French instrument made by one Grobert of Mirecourt. The luthier made his instrument in the style of René Lacôte, a more well-known Paris-based guitar-maker. It is preserved and on display in the Musée de la Musique in Paris.

Of the guitars he owned through his life, there was an instrument by Gennaro Fabricatore that he had refused to sell even in his periods of financial stress, and was among the instruments in his possession at the time of his death.

=== Violin technique ===
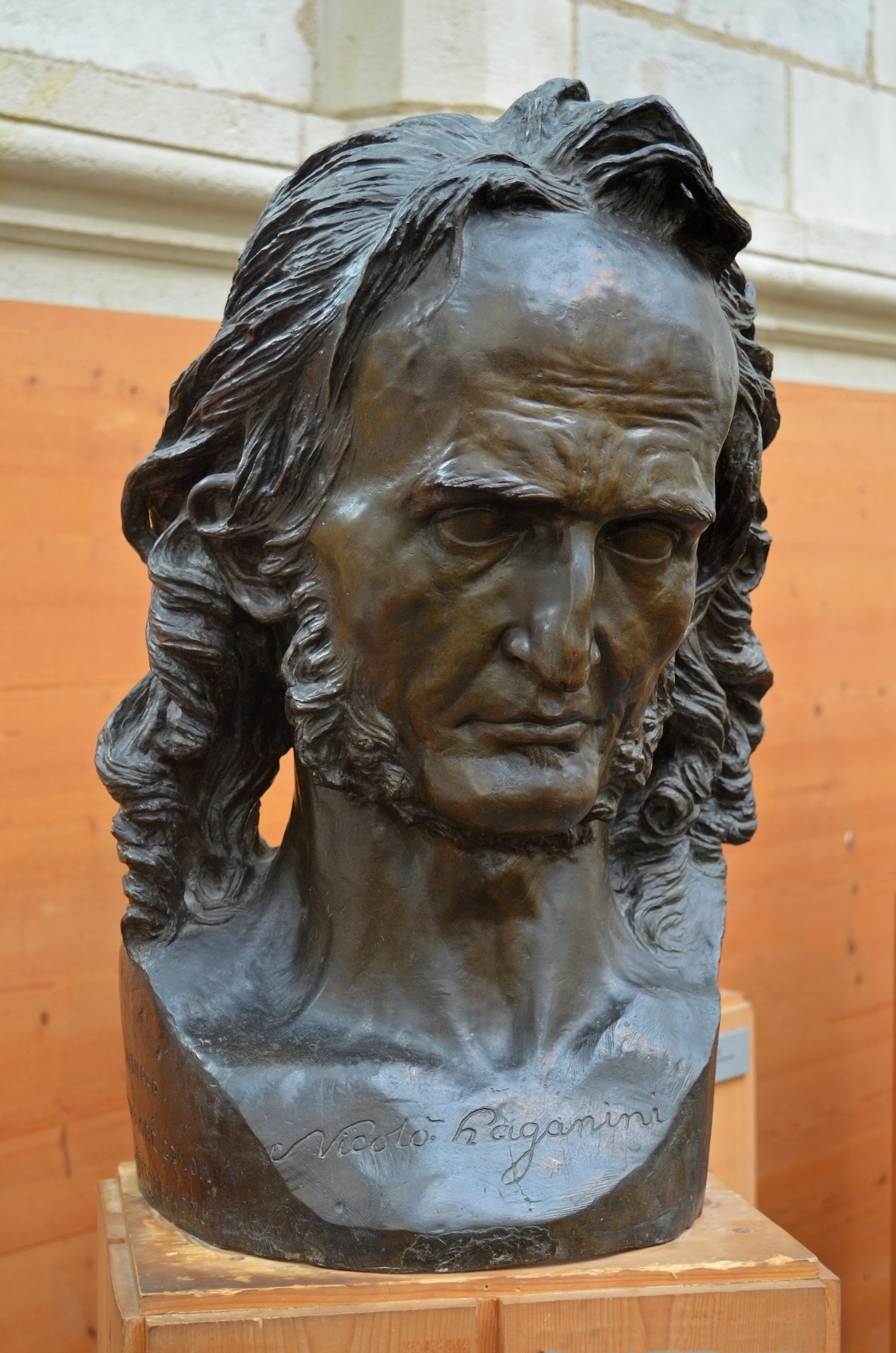
Bust of Niccolò Paganini by David d'Angers (1830–1833)

The Israeli violinist Ivry Gitlis once referred to Paganini as a phenomenon rather than a development. Though some of the techniques frequently employed by Paganini were already present, most accomplished violinists of the time focused on intonation and bowing techniques. Arcangelo Corelli was considered a pioneer in transforming the violin from an ensemble instrument to a solo instrument. Other notable violinists included Antonio Vivaldi and Giuseppe Tartini, who, in their compositions, reflected the increasing technical and musical demands on the violinist. Although the role of the violin in music drastically changed through this period, progress in violin technique was steady but slow.

Much of Paganini's playing (and his violin composition) was influenced by two violinists, Pietro Locatelli and August Duranowski (Auguste Frédéric Durand). During Paganini's study in Parma, he came across the 24 Caprices of Locatelli (entitled L'arte di nuova modulazione – Capricci enigmatici or The art of the new style – the enigmatic caprices). Published in the 1730s, they were shunned by the musical authorities for their technical innovations, and were forgotten by the musical community at large. Around the same time, Durand, a former student of Giovanni Battista Viotti, became a celebrated violinist. He was renowned for his use of harmonics, both natural and artificial (which had previously not been attempted in performance), and the left hand pizzicato in his performance. Paganini was impressed by Durand's innovations and showmanship, which later also became the hallmarks of the young violin virtuoso. Paganini was instrumental in the revival and popularization of these violinistic techniques.

Another aspect of Paganini's violin techniques concerned his flexibility. He had exceptionally long fingers and was capable of playing three octaves across four strings in a hand span, an extraordinary feat even by today's standards.

== Compositions ==
Paganini: all six violin concertos

Paganini composed his own works to play exclusively in his concerts, all of which profoundly influenced the evolution of violin technique. His 24 Caprices were likely composed between 1805 and 1809, while he was in the service of the Baciocchi court. Also during this period, he composed the majority of the solo pieces, duo-sonatas, trios, and quartets for the guitar, either as a solo instrument or with strings. These chamber works may have been inspired by the publication, in Lucca, of the guitar quintets of Boccherini. Many of his variations, including Le Streghe, The Carnival of Venice, and Nel cor più non mi sento, were composed, or at least first performed, before his European concert tour. His six violin concertos were written between 1817 and 1830.

Generally speaking, Paganini's compositions were technically imaginative, and the timbre of the instrument was greatly expanded as a result of these works. Sounds of different musical instruments and animals were often imitated. One such composition was titled Il Fandango Spanolo (The Spanish Dance), which featured a series of humorous imitations of farm animals. Even more outrageous was a solo piece Duetto Amoroso, in which the sighs and groans of lovers were intimately depicted on the violin. There survives a manuscript of the Duetto, which has been recorded. The existence of the Fandango is known only through concert posters.

Variations on One String (Moses Fantasy)
Performed by John Michell (cello) with a pianist

Eugène Ysaÿe criticized Paganini's works for lacking characteristics of true polyphonism. Yehudi Menuhin, on the other hand, suggested that this might have been the result of Paganini's reliance on the guitar (in lieu of the piano) as an aid in composition. The orchestral parts for his concertos were often polite, unadventurous, and clearly supportive of the soloist. In this, his style is consistent with that of other Italian composers such as Giovanni Paisiello, Gioachino Rossini, and Gaetano Donizetti, who were influenced by the guitar-song milieu of Naples during this period.

Paganini's "La Campanella" and the A minor Caprice (No. 24) have inspired many composers, including Franz Liszt, Robert Schumann, Johannes Brahms, Sergei Rachmaninoff, Boris Blacher, Andrew Lloyd Webber, George Rochberg, and Witold Lutosławski, all of whom wrote variations on these works.

== Legacy and influence ==
=== Inspired works ===
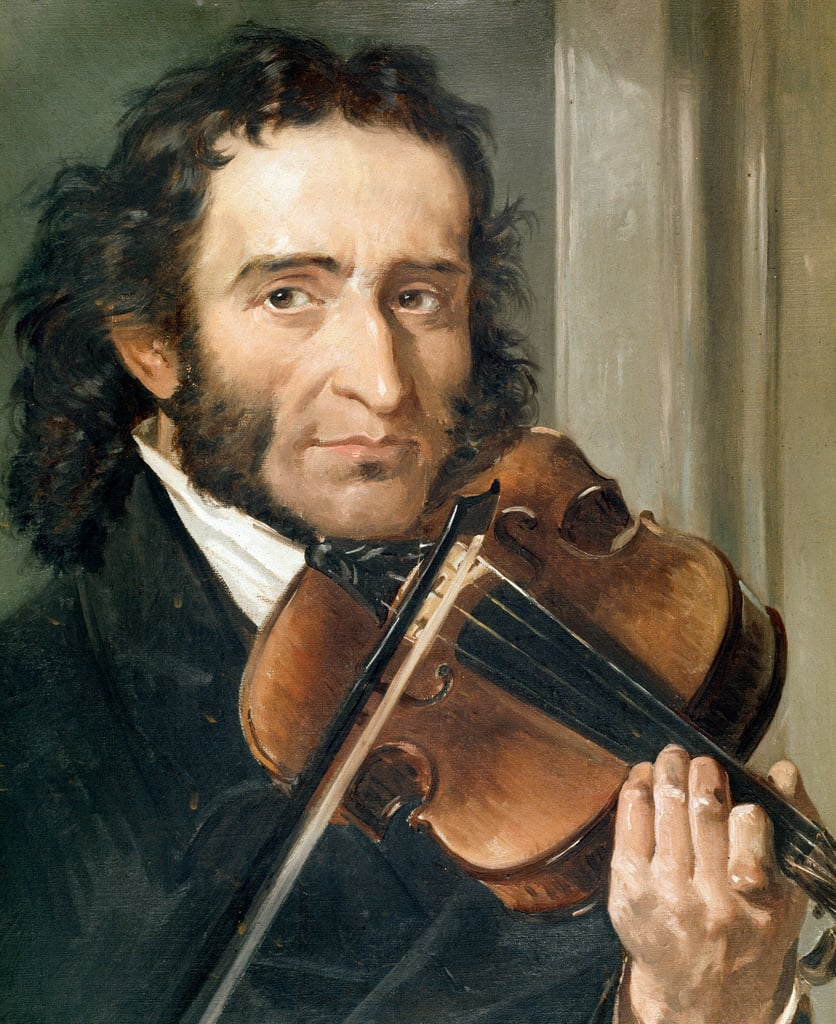
Portrait of Niccolò Paganini by Andrea Cefaly

Notable works inspired by compositions of Paganini include:

- Jason Becker – Caprice No. 5
- Mike Campese – "Paganini", arrangement of Caprice No. 16 and various works.
- Julián Carrillo – "6 Sonatas dedicadas a Paganini" for solo violin.
- Alfredo Casella – Paganiniana Op. 65 (1942)
- Mario Castelnuovo-Tedesco – Capriccio Diabolico for classical guitar is a homage to Paganini, and quotes "La campanella"
- Frédéric Chopin – Souvenir de Paganini for solo piano (1829; published posthumously)
- Ivry Gitlis – Cadenza for the 1st movement of Paganini's Violin Concerto No. 2 Op. 7 "La Campanella" (1967)
- Johann Nepomuk Hummel – Fantasia for piano in C major "Souvenir de Paganini", WoO 8, S. 190.
- Fritz Kreisler – Paganini Concerto in D major (recomposed paraphrase of the first movement of the Op. 6 Concerto) for violin and orchestra
- Franz Lehár – Paganini, a fictionalized operetta about Paganini (1925)
- Franz Liszt – Six Grandes Études de Paganini, S. 141 for solo piano (1851) (virtuoso arrangements of 5 caprices, including the 24th, and La Campanella from Violin Concerto No. 2)
- Yngwie Malmsteen – Paganini's Violin Concerto No. 4 is used in the opening of "Far Beyond the Sun" in Trial by Fire. Caprice No. 24 was used as a part of the solo in the song "Prophet of Doom" from the album War to End All Wars.
- Nathan Milstein – Paganiniana, a set of variations based on the theme from Paganini's 24th Caprice in which the variations are based on motifs from other caprices
- Cesare Pugni – "Le Carnaval de Venise" pas de deux (aka "Satanella" pas de deux). Based on airs from Paganini's Il carnevale di Venezia, op. 10. Originally choreographed by Marius Petipa as a concert piece for himself and the ballerina Amalia Ferraris. First performed at the Imperial Bolshoi Kamenny Theatre of Saint Petersburg on 24 February [O.S. 12 February] 1859.
- George Rochberg – Caprice Variations (1970), 50 variations for solo violin
- Michael Romeo – "Concerto in B Minor" is an adaptation of Allegro Maestoso (first movement) of Paganini's Violin Concerto No. 2 in B minor, Op. 7.
- Uli Jon Roth – "Scherzo alla Paganini" and "Paganini Paraphrase"
- Robert Schumann – Studies after Caprices by Paganini, Op. 3 (1832; piano); 6 Concert Studies on Caprices by Paganini, Op. 10 (1833, piano). A movement from his piano work Carnaval (Op. 9, dedicated to Karol Lipiński) is named for Paganini.
- Johann Sedlatzek (19th-century Polish flautist known as "The Paganini of the Flute") – "Souvenir à Paganini" Grand Variations on "The Carnival of Venice"
- Marilyn Shrude – Renewing the Myth for alto saxophone and piano
- Steve Vai – "Eugene's Trick Bag" from the movie Crossroads. Based on Caprice Nr. 5
- Philip Wilby – Paganini Variations for both wind band and brass band
- August Wilhelmj – Paganini Concerto in D major (recomposed paraphrase of the first movement of the Op. 6 Concerto) for violin and orchestra
- Eugène Ysaÿe – Paganini Variations for violin and piano

The Caprice No. 24 in A minor, Op. 1, (Tema con variazioni) has been the basis of works by many other composers. Notable examples include Brahms's Variations on a Theme of Paganini, Rachmaninoff's Rhapsody on a Theme of Paganini and Lutosławski's. Variations on a Theme by Paganini.

=== Memorials and other tributes ===
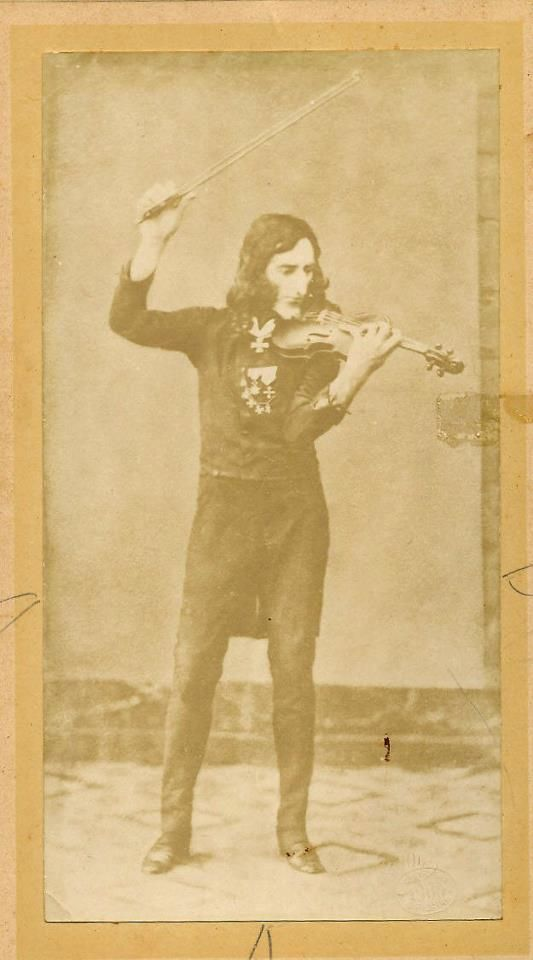
1900 Imperial Cabinet card of famous Fiorini fake daguerreotype of Paganini

In 1904 the Genoa Conservatory was renamed the "Conservatorio Niccolò Paganini" in honor of the composer. The conservatory is also host to the Paganini Competition (Premio Paganini); an international violin competition created in 1954.

In 1972 the State of Italy purchased a large collection of Niccolò Paganini manuscripts from the W. Heyer Library of Cologne. They are housed at the Biblioteca Casanatense in Rome.

In 1982 the city of Genoa commissioned a thematic catalogue of music by Paganini, edited by Maria Rosa Moretti and Anna Sorrento, hence the abbreviation "MS" assigned to his catalogued works.

A minor planet 2859 Paganini discovered in 1978 by Soviet astronomer Nikolai Chernykh is named after him.

=== "Paganini non ripete" ===
lit. 'Paganini does not repeat'. The phrase originates from an episode dating back to 1818: in Teatro Carignano, Turin, the artist was asked by King Charles Felix for an encore of a piece he had liked; but since Paganini had improvised, he was unable to repeat the performance and is said to have given this as his answer. As a result, he was expelled from the Kingdom of Sardinia for two years. The phrase is still used in common Italian parlance to justify the refusal to repeat a gesture or phrase, usually with an ironic connotation.

=== Fiorini daguerreotype ===
Although no photographs of Paganini are known to exist, in 1900, the Italian violin maker Giuseppe Fiorini forged the now famous fake daguerreotype of the celebrated violinist. So well in fact, that even the classical author and conversationalist Arthur M. Abell was led to believe it to be true, reprinting the image in the 22 January 1901 issue of the Musical Courier.

=== Dramatic portrayals ===
Paganini has been portrayed by a number of actors in film and television productions, including Stewart Granger in the 1946 biographical portrait The Magic Bow, Roxy Roth in A Song to Remember (1945), Klaus Kinski in Kinski Paganini (1989), and David Garrett in The Devil's Violinist (2013).

In the Soviet 1982 miniseries Niccolo Paganini, the musician was portrayed by the Armenian actor Vladimir Msryan. The series focuses on Paganini's relationship with the Roman Catholic Church. Another Soviet actor, Armen Dzhigarkhanyan, played Paganini's fictionalized arch-rival, an insidious Jesuit official. The information in the series is generally spurious, and it also plays to some of the myths and legends rampant during the musician's lifetime. One memorable scene shows Paganini's adversaries sabotaging his violin before a high-profile performance, causing all strings but one to break during the concert. An undeterred Paganini continues to perform on three, two, and finally on a single string. In actuality, Paganini himself occasionally broke strings during his performances on purpose so he could further display his virtuosity. He did this by carefully filing notches into them to weaken them, so that they would break when in use.

In Don Nigro's satirical comedy play Paganini (1995), the great violinist seeks vainly for his salvation, claiming that he unknowingly sold his soul to the Devil. "Variation upon variation," he cries at one point, "but which variation leads to salvation and which to damnation? Music is a question for which there is no answer." Paganini is portrayed as having killed three of his lovers and sinking repeatedly into poverty, prison, and drink. Each time he is "rescued" by the Devil, who appears in different guises, returning Paganini's violin so he can continue playing. In the end, Paganini's salvation—administered by a god-like Clockmaker—turns out to be imprisonment in a large bottle where he plays his music for the amusement of the public through all eternity. "Do not pity him, my dear," the Clockmaker tells Antonia, one of Paganini's murdered wives. "He is alone with the answer for which there is no question. The saved and the damned are the same."

The musical CROSS ROAD ~The Devil's Violinist Paganini~, premiered 2022 and revived 2024, features Niccolo Paganini as a main character, played by Hiroki Aiba (2022 and 2024), Kenta Mizue (2022), and Kento Kinouchi (2024). The story is about his making a contract with the Devil of Music, Amduscias, played by Akinori Nakagawa in both productions. The musical is by Bun-O Fujisawa, composed by Toshiyuki Muranaka. It was performed at Theater Creation in Tokyo, Japan, with a national tour in 2024.

Another musical about Paganini has been produced in South Korea, called Paganini. It focuses on his son, Achille.
