= Supreme Order of the Eagle =

Honorary decoration of the Republic of Albania

Supreme Order of the Eagle Urdhri Suprem i Shqiponjës
- Grand Star of the Order

Awarded by the President of Albania
- Type: Order of merit
- Established: 28 March 2024
- Country: Albania
- Motto: Besë e Bashkim ("Fidelity and Unity")
- Eligibility: Albanians, foreign citizens, institutions and organizations
- Awarded for: Exceptional and distinguished civil or military service benefiting the Albanian state and nation, society and democratic values.
- Status: Currently constituted
- Head of the Order: President of the Republic
- Grades: Grand Collar (reserved for the President); Grand Star; Grand Officer; Commander; Officer; Knight
- Ribbon bar

The Supreme Order of the Eagle (Albanian: Urdhri Suprem i Shqiponjës; USSH) is the highest state decoration of Albania. Established under Law No. 93/2022, it represents the greatest expression of recognition granted by the Albanian state. It is awarded for exceptional and distinguished civil or military service benefiting the nation, society and democratic values.

The President of the Republic serves as head of the order and confers it by presidential decree.

== History ==
Within Albania's current system of state honors, the Supreme Order of the Eagle is comparable to the formerly Order of the Black Eagle, instituted by Prince Wied, in 1914 and the Order of Besa, established by Ahmet Zogu, in 1926. As the latter developed into a dynastic decoration of the future Albanian royal family, the new order draws primarily on the tradition of the Order of the Black Eagle.

The order includes the superior grade of the Grand Collar, reserved exclusively for the president of the Republic, in his or her capacity as Head of the Orders.

In phaleristic literature, the original design of the Order of the Black Eagle had long been regarded as a distinctive example of the Albanian tradition of honors, setting it apart from other Western European orders.

The modern-day Supreme Order of the Eagle retains several elements of its predecessor, including the motto "Besë e Bashkim" (Fidelity and Unity) and the national colors of red and black, rearranged in more balanced proportions on the ribbon.

A few defining changes from the original model are the replacement of the princely crown with Skanderbeg's helmet and the addition of small silver eagles at the extremities of the Grand Star.

== Insignia ==
=== Grades ===
Excluding the Grand Collar reserved for the President of the Republic, the Supreme Order of the Eagle comprises five ordinary grades, in descending order of precedence:

Insignia	Description
	Grand Star; The Grand Star consists of an 80 mm breast star and a 58 mm badge worn from a sash. The breast star is an eight-pointed, white-enameled star with eight small silver double-headed eagles between its points. Its black central medallion bears a gilded relief double-headed eagle based on the official 1922 model, surrounded by a red-enameled ring inscribed "BESË E BASHKIM" and surmounted by Skanderbeg's helmet. The star has a raised profile of approximately 10–15 mm and is secured by a vertical pin. It is made of 960/999 silver gilded with 750/999 gold. The sash badge follows the same design but omits the eight smaller eagles and has a convex profile of approximately 2–3 mm. It is attached by a hinge to Skanderbeg's helmet, which is connected by a 12 mm ring to the sash. The red watered-silk sash is 101 mm wide and approximately 2 m long, with an 11 mm black stripe along each edge. Its ends are joined by a bow of the same material, from which the badge is suspended.
	Grand Officer; The Grand Officer insignia consists of an 80 mm breast star and a neck badge. The breast star follows the basic design of the Grand Star but omits the eight small silver eagles positioned between its points. It is made of 960/999 silver gilded with 750/999 gold. The neck badge is identical to the sash badge of the Grand Star and is suspended from a 50 mm-wide red-and-black ribbon.
	Commander; The Commander grade consists of the same 58 mm neck badge as the Grand Officer, suspended from a 50 mm-wide neck ribbon. It differs from the Grand Officer grade in that it is awarded without a breast star.
	Officer; The Officer badge takes the form of a six-pointed star, distinguishing it from the eight-pointed insignia of the three higher ordinary grades. Its design derives from the lower grades of the historic Order of the Black Eagle, instituted in 1914. The 46 mm badge is made of enameled 960/990 silver gilded with 750-fineness gold. It is single-sided and joined by a hinge to Skanderbeg's helmet, facing right. The insignia is then suspended from a 37 mm-wide ribbon and worn on the left side of the chest.
	Knight; The Knight badge features a six-pointed star measuring 46 mm, similar in design to the Officer badge but made of enameled 960/990 silver without gilding. Unlike the Officer grade, it omits the hinged representation of Skanderbeg's helmet and is attached directly to a 37 mm-wide ribbon by a 10 mm suspension ring. The insignia is worn on the left side of the chest.

==== Grand Collar ====
Insignia	Description
	The Grand Collar is a unique specimen reserved for the incumbent President of the Republic and passes between successive officeholders. It is made of solid gold, a different precious metal, or alternatively from 960/999 silver, gilded with 750/999 gold. Its principal pendant is a 76 mm black-enameled double-headed eagle, based on the official 1922 model, with unenameled heads and talons and a red shield bearing the monogram RSH for "Republika e Shqipërisë". The eagle is suspended from Skanderbeg's helmet, positioned beneath two crossed swords. The chain comprises nine red-enameled double-headed eagles alternating with ten laurel branches, each containing a five-pointed star. Its design derives from the Albanian state collar used between 1925 and 1939, adapted with republican symbols including Skanderbeg's helmet and the RSH monogram.

==== Ribbons and miniatures ====
The ribbon common to the grades of the order is red with black stripes along its edges. The Grand Star sash measures 101 mm in width, while the Grand Officer and Commander neck ribbons are 50 mm wide and the Officer and Knight ribbons are 37 mm wide.

The neck ribbons are approximately 50 cm long and terminate in narrow ties used to fasten the decoration around the collar. The ribbons of the Officer and Knight grades are approximately 20 cm long and are folded through the suspension ring of the badge.

Miniatures reproduce the respective insignia at a reduced size of approximately 12–25 mm and are suspended from watered-silk ribbons measuring between 10 and 13 mm in width. Military ribbon bars measure approximately 37 mm by 10–12 mm, while rosettes denoting membership and grade range from approximately 6 to 12 mm in diameter.

== Notable recipients ==
=== Grand Collar ===
- Bajram Begaj — President of Albania; ex officio as head of the order

=== Grand Star ===
- Alfred Moisiu — former President of Albania
- Besim Elezi — surgeon
- Seit Mansaku — linguist
- Fra' John T. Dunlap — Prince and Grand Master of the Sovereign Military Order of Malta

=== Grand Officer ===
- Aurel Plasari — scholar and albanologist

=== Officer ===
- Tedi Papavrami — violinist and translator

== See also ==
- Chancellery of Orders and Medals of the Republic
- Orders, decorations, and medals of Albania
- Order of the Black Eagle
- Order of Besa
