= Perpetuum mobile =

Type of musical composition

In music, perpetuum mobile (English pronunciation /pərˌpɛtjʊəm ˈmoʊbɪleɪ/, /ˈmoʊbɪli/; Latin, literally, "perpetual motion"), moto perpetuo (Italian), mouvement perpétuel (French), movimento perpétuo (Portuguese) movimiento perpetuo (Spanish), is a term used to describe a rapidly executed and persistently maintained figuration, usually of notes of equal length. Over time it has taken on two distinct applications: first, as describing entire musical compositions or passages within them that are characterised by a continuous stream of notes, usually but not always at a rapid tempo; and second, as describing entire compositions, or extended passages within them that are meant to be played in a repetitious fashion, often an indefinite number of times.

== Types of perpetuum mobile composition ==
A well-known example as a technique is the presto finale of Frédéric Chopin's Piano Sonata No. 2: This figuration of rapid triplet quavers (eighth notes) continues for the duration of the movement.

"Elfentanz"
A perpetuum mobile for cello and piano by David Popper, consisting of continuous spiccato. Hans Goldstein (cello) and Mellicia Straaf (piano).

As a distinct composition, perpetuum mobile can be defined as one in which part or most of the piece is intended to be repeated an often unspecified number of times, without the "motion" of the melody being halted when a repeat begins.

Canons are often intended to be performed in a moto perpetuo fashion, and can thus be called canon perpetuus.

In some cases the repeats of a "perpetuum mobile" piece are at a different pitch, a modulation or a chord progression occurs during the repeatable part. Some of the riddle canons of Bach's Das Musikalische Opfer are examples of this particular kind of perpetuum mobile/canon perpetuus.

Perpetuum mobile as a genre of separate musical compositions was at the height of its popularity by the end of the 19th century. Such pieces would often be performed as virtuoso encores, in some cases increasing the tempo along the repeats.

== Examples ==
Perpetuum mobile pieces of both kinds include:

=== Baroque period ===
- Bach's Presto from Violin Sonata No. 1, Corrente and every Double from Violin Partita No. 1, Allegro from Violin Sonata No. 2, Allegro assai from Violin Sonata No. 3, and Preludio from Violin Partita No. 3 consists almost entirely of a continuous stream of notes.
- Bach's Prelude from his Prelude and Fugue in C Minor, BWV 847 from the Well-Tempered Clavier
- Various pieces by Antonio Vivaldi, including the third movement from the "Summer" concerto being the most famous

=== Classical period ===
- The finale of Haydn's String Quartet No. 53 in D major ("The Lark"), Op. 64, No. 5
- The finale of Beethoven's 22nd piano sonata, and large segments of the finales of his Tempest and Appassionata sonatas (although these are not very fast; the Tempest and the 22nd sonata are only marked Allegretto, and the Appassionata is marked Allegro ma non troppo)
- The second of Franz Schubert's Impromptus, D. 899
- The fourth of Franz Schubert's moments musicaux (likewise not very fast, marked Moderato)

=== Romantic period ===
Nicolò Paganini's Moto perpetuo Op. 11 (N° 6)
Arranged for soprano saxophone, performed in 2015 by David Hernando Vitores (3:34)

- The finale of Carl Maria von Weber's Piano Sonata No. 1
- Charles-Valentin Alkan's Le chemin de fer, op. 27, for piano
- Felix Mendelssohn's Perpetuum mobile, op. 119, for piano
- Ottokar Novacek's Perpetuum Mobile, for violin and piano
- Niccolò Paganini's Moto perpetuo Op. 11 (No. 6) for violin (Note: This is most often performed with a rather insignificant obbligato accompaniment. When scored for wind instruments, it becomes a virtuoso challenge of circular breathing and double-tonguing. Béla Fleck has performed it on the banjo.)
- Niccolò Paganini's 24 Caprices; nearly every caprice contains sections with perpetual motion. Specifically, Caprice No. 16 is entirely Perpetuum mobile.
- Nikolai Rimsky-Korsakov's Flight of the Bumblebee, an interlude for his opera The Tale of Tsar Saltan
- Johann Strauss II's Perpetuum Mobile: musikalischer Scherz for orchestra
- Robert Schumann's Hasche-Mann from Kinderszenen
- Bedřich Smetana's Album Leaf No.3 from Six Album Leaves Op. 2
- Tchaikovsky's Piano Concerto No. 1, third movement
- Tchaikovsky's Symphony No. 6, third movement
- Pablo de Sarasate's Tarantella from his Introduction and Tarantella Op. 43
- Henryk Wieniawski's Etude-Caprice Nos. 3 and 4 from Études-Caprices Op. 18 for two violins

=== 20th century ===
- Mouvement (from Images, Set 1), a 1905 piano composition by Claude Debussy
- Perpetuum Mobile (from Die allerersten Vortragsstueckchen des jungen Cellisten Op.19) by Hugo Schlemüller (1912)
- The second movement of Prokofiev's Piano Concerto No. 2 (1912–1913)
- Trois Mouvements perpétuels, a 1918 piano composition by Francis Poulenc
- The end of the opera Wozzeck, Act III Scene 5, by Alban Berg (1914–1924)
- The last movement of Maurice Ravel's Violin Sonata No. 2 (1923–1927)
- The organ solo (movement 7) from Janáček's Glagolitic Mass (1926)
- The last movement of the Violin Concerto by Samuel Barber (1939)
- The last movement of Béla Bartók's Concerto for Orchestra(1943)
- Prelude no. 2 in A minor from 24 Preludes and Fugues by Dmitri Shostakovich (1950–1951). Also the third movement of his Symphony No. 8 in C minor
- The final movement of Benjamin Britten's Cello Sonata in C Major Op. 65 (1960). Also the third movement of his Suite for Violin and Piano Op. 6 (1935), the finale of his first solo cello suite (1964) and the penultimate movement of his third cello suite (1972)
- The Allegro from Kreisler's Praeludium and Allegro
- Arvo Pärt's orchestral Perpetuum mobile (1963)
- "Perpetuum Mobile" by Michael Roberts, used as the startup music for Thames Television and earlier ABC Weekend TV
- "Perpetuum Mobile for pedals alone" a showpiece for Organ by Wilhelm Middelschulte
- "Suite No. 1", a three-movement guitar and piano oriented piece by Robert Fripp, performed by Giles, Giles and Fripp for their only album The Cheerful Insanity of Giles, Giles & Fripp (1968). The first movement and the epilogue of the third movement encapsulate moto perpetuo in its stringed section.
- "Gossipo Perpetuo", a two-minute electronic piece by Jean Jacques Perrey for his Moog Indigo (1970) album, built around the concept of gossip via vocal sampled 'blah' sounds.
- "Fracture", a moto perpetuo piece based on the whole-tone scale composed by Robert Fripp and included on the 1974 King Crimson album Starless and Bible Black
- "Canto Ostinato" by Simeon ten Holt (1976)
- John Adams's Short Ride in a Fast Machine (1986)
- "Perpetuum Mobile" by Penguin Cafe Orchestra (1987)
- "Velocities (Moto Perpetuo)" for solo marimba by Joseph Schwantner (1990)
- "Equus" by Eric Whitacre (2000)

=== 21st century ===
- The album Perpetuum Mobile by the German avant garde group Einstürzende Neubauten has some examples of the concept
- Neil Peart's drum solo "Moto perpetuo" on Rush's 2011 album Time Machine 2011: Live in Cleveland
- "Nonstop" by Juan María Solare, piano solo invention in the time signature 5/8 (2020).
- The Finale of The Endless Rain by Sen Ishi (pen name)
