= Sonata for Solo Violin =

Sonata for Solo Violin may refer to:

- Sonatas and partitas for solo violin (Bach)
- Sonata for Solo Violin (Bartók)
- Sonata for Solo Violin (Prokofiev)
- Six Sonatas for solo violin (Ysaÿe)
