= Variations on "God Save the King" =

Introduction and Variations on the Theme "God Save the King"
- by Niccolò Paganini
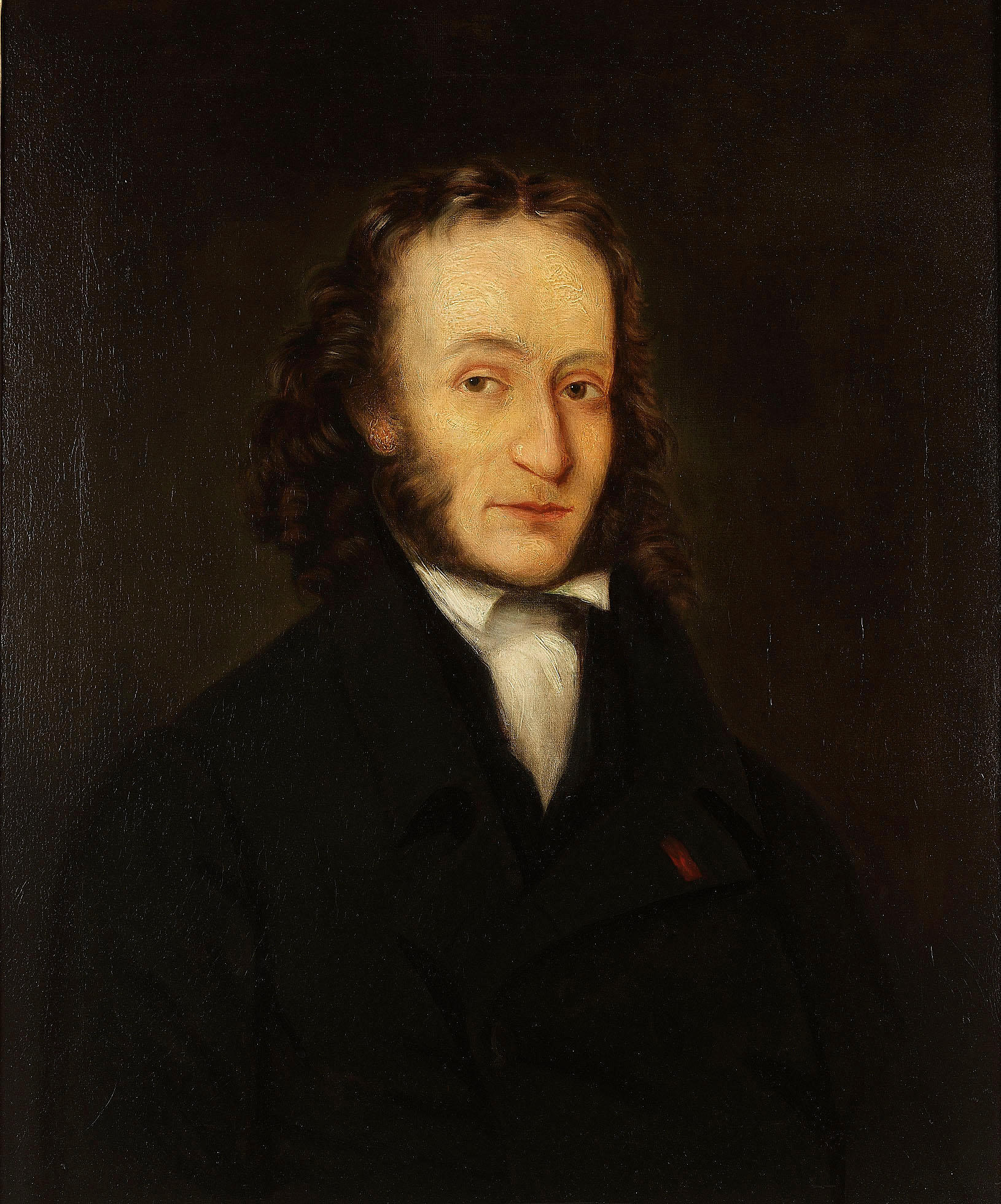
- The composer
- Key: G major (originally in E♭ major)
- Catalogue: MS 56
- Opus: Op. 9
- Year: 1829
- Duration: 7 minutes approximately
- Scoring: Solo violin

The Introduction and Variations on the Theme "God Save the King", Op. 9, MS 56, also commonly entitled Variations on the English National Anthem, God Save the Queen, or Heil dir im Siegerkranz, is a theme and variations for solo violin by Italian virtuoso and composer Niccolò Paganini.

== Background ==
The set of theme and variations was composed in 1829, as indicated in a letter sent to Luigi Guglielmo Germi dated 3 April 1829, in which Paganini stated: “I have methodically written a set of variations on the theme God Save the King, to be performed on my violin alone, in order to convince the unbelievers.” Initially conceived as a solo work, Paganini later prepared a version with orchestral or piano accompaniment. The composer drew inspiration from the Prussian anthem "Heil dir im Siegerkranz", itself adapted from the English anthem "God Save the King". Nevertheless, he often referred to the work by its English title, which also appears in the manuscripts.

In correspondence with King Friedrich Wilhelm III of Prussia, Paganini stated that he intended to perform the piece at a concert for the victims of the 1829 Gdańsk flood, a catastrophic event that claimed more than twenty lives, and that the composition had been written as a tribute to the monarch. The first known performance took place at this charity concert in Berlin on May 29, 1829. On that occasion, Friedrich Wilhelm III appointed Paganini as his chamber virtuoso. The work was later frequently performed as an encore in London between 1831 and 1833. The first documented London performance took place at the King’s Theatre on August 20, 1831. The title used on each occasion, whether in English or German, depended on the place of performance.

The work was not published during the composer’s lifetime. The autograph manuscript is presumed lost, although an autograph draft containing only the monodic theme, without arpeggiation, survives at the Biblioteca Casanatense in Rome, within the harp part of an orchestral bundle associated with I palpiti. A manuscript copy by an unknown hand, together with a full orchestral score, is also preserved at the same library. The piece was first published in 1851 as part of a collection of posthumous works issued jointly by Schonenberger in Paris, the sons of B. Schott in Mainz and London, and Ricordi in Milan. This edition, which appeared alongside well-known works such as the First and Second Violin Concertos, Le streghe, and I palpiti, presents the piece in a version for violin and piano.

== Structure ==
The Variations on “God Save the King” were originally written in G major, with the specification that the violin strings should be scordatura tuned a major third lower, resulting in a sounding key of E♭ major. The only orchestral arrangement prepared by Paganini is already transposed to E♭ major. Despite this, modern editions and performances often present the work in G major. The piece has an approximate duration of seven minutes. Its structure is as follows:

- Introduction. Andante
- Theme. Andante sostenuto
- Variation I. Un poco più mosso spiritoso
- Variation II. A terzine con qualità di dolcezza
- Variation III. Lento
- Variation IV. Vivace
- Variation V. Larghetto
- Variation VI (Finale). Presto energicamente

== Recordings ==
The following is a list of recordings of the composition:

Recordings of Niccolò Paganini's Variations on "God Save the King", Op. 9
Violin	Date of recording	Place of recording	Label	Notes
Salvatore Accardo	January 1976	Barking Town Hall, London, UK	Deutsche Grammophon	
Stefan Milenkovich	October 2002	Dynamic's, Genoa, Italy	Dynamic	
