= 24 Caprices for Solo Violin (Paganini) =

Musical compositions by Niccolò Paganini

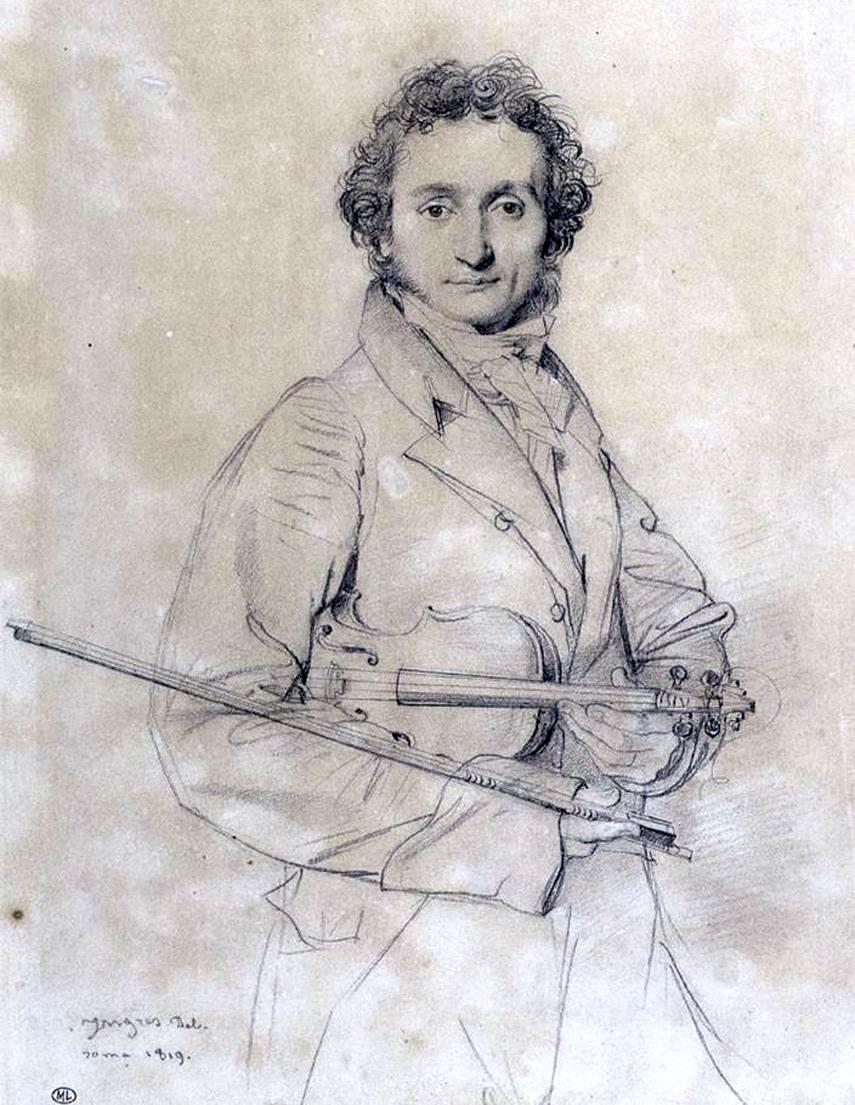
Niccolò Paganini

The 24 Caprices for Solo Violin were written in groups (seven, five and twelve) by Niccolò Paganini between 1802 and 1817. They are also designated as M.S. 25 in Maria Rosa Moretti's and Anna Sorrento's Catalogo tematico delle musiche di Niccolò Paganini which was published in 1982. The Caprices are in the form of études, with each number exploring different skills (double stopped trills, extremely fast switching of positions and strings, etc.)

Ricordi first published them in 1820, where they were grouped and numbered from 1 to 24 as Op. 1, together with 12 Sonatas for Violin and Guitar (Op. 2 and 3) and 6 Guitar Quartets (Op. 4 and 5). When Paganini released his Caprices, he dedicated them "alli artisti" (to the artists) rather than to a specific person. A sort of dedication can be recognized in Paganini's own score, where he annotated between 1832 and 1840 a 'dedicatee' for each Caprice (possibly ready for a new printed edition).

Ferdinand David's first edition was published by Breitkopf & Härtel in 1854. David, as editor, also issued an edition of Caprices with piano accompaniments by Robert Schumann. Another edition by David was issued in two books of 12 caprices each "mit hinzugefügter Begleitung des Pianoforte von Ferdinand David" (with additional piano accompaniment by Ferdinand David) and published by Breitkopf & Härtel (c. 1860).

Unlike many earlier and later sets of 24 pieces, there was no intention to write these caprices in 24 different keys.

== Details ==
No.	Key	Movements	Dedicatee	Notes
1	E major	Andante	Henri Vieuxtemps	Nicknamed "The Arpeggio", this composition matches chordal playing with ricochet bowing across all 4 strings. The piece opens in E major and then quickly transitions into an E minor development section, where descending scales in thirds are introduced.
2	B minor	Moderato	Giuseppe Austri	The second caprice focuses on detaché with many string crossings across non-adjacent strings.
3	E minor	Sostenuto/Presto/Sostenuto	Ernesto Camillo Sivori	Caprice No. 3 is a slurred legato exercise with octave trills in the introduction and conclusion.
4	C minor	Maestoso	Ole Bornemann Bull	Caprice No. 4 is an exercise featuring passages that alter between slow passages with multiple voices and fast passages with many challenging double stops.
5	A minor	Agitato	Heinrich Wilhelm Ernst	Caprice No. 5 focuses on fast ricochet bowings. It begins and ends with a section of ascending arpeggios followed by descending scales.
6	G minor	Lento	Karol Józef Lipiński	Nicknamed "The Trill", the sixth caprice exploits the use of left-hand tremolo on the violin by quickly alternating between different notes in the chord in one of the voices. A melody is played in one line with a tremolo occurring on another.
7	A minor	Posato	Franz Liszt	This caprice focuses on slurred staccato passages, featuring many long slurred scales and arpeggios.
8	E♭ major	Maestoso	Delphin Alard	Caprice No. 8 focuses on sustaining a drone note while playing a melody at the same time, meanwhile incorporating many trills, double stops, and scales in staccato.
9	E major	Allegretto	Herrmann	Nicknamed "La Chasse" or "The Hunt", the violin's A and E strings imitate the flutes ("Sulla tastiera imitando il Flauto"), while the G and D strings imitate the horns ("imitando il Corno sulla D e G corda"). Primarily a study in double stops, with ricochet occurring in the middle section.
10	G minor	Vivace	Theodor Haumann	This caprice is primarily a study in up-bow staccato, with staccato notes punctuated by chords, trills and distant string crossings.
11	C major	Andante/Presto/Andante	Sigismond Thalberg	The eleventh caprice starts and ends with sections that require multiple voices, containing a passage that consists of many dotted notes rapidly jumping up and down the scale.
12	A♭ major	Allegro	Dhuler	This caprice consists of a slurred pattern of a melody on an upper string alternating with a drone note on a bottom string, forcing the violinist to stretch great distances while keeping a finger on the drone string.
13	B♭ major	Allegro	Charles Philippe Lafont	Nicknamed "The Devil's Laughter", Caprice No. 13 starts out with scale-like double-stopped passages at a moderate speed. The second part consists of high speed runs that exercise left hand flexibility and position shifting, and right-hand high-speed string changing and detache bowing. The piece then repeats back to the beginning and ends right before reaching the second part for the second time.
14	E♭ major	Moderato	Jacques Pierre Rode	The 14th caprice displays the violin's ability to voice chords. It contains many triple and quadruple stops. Stylistically, the piece imitates brass fanfares.
15	E minor	Posato	Louis Spohr	Caprice 15 is in ABA form. The "A" section is in E minor and starts with a melody in octaves followed by a variation in 32nd notes. The "B" section is in G major (the relative major to E minor) and features upbow staccato and singly-bowed arpeggios.
16	G minor	Presto	Rodolphe Kreutzer	Caprice No. 16 is perhaps the simplest of the caprices. The chief difficulties are string crossings and some broken tenths. The only chord is the final note.
17	E♭ major	Sostenuto/Andante	Alexandre Artôt	The "A" section contains numerous thirty-second note runs on the A and E strings that converse back and forth with double stops on the lower two strings. The middle section is famous for the incredibly difficult octave passage.
18	C major	Corrente/Allegro	Antoine Bohrer	The introduction to caprice 18 demonstrates playing on the G string in very high positions, imitating the sound of a post horn. This is followed by a rapid display of scales in thirds.
19	E♭ major	Lento/Allegro assai	Andreas Jakob Romberg	After 4 measures of octaves marked Lento, the rest of the caprice is in ABA form marked Allegro assai. The "A" section consists of playful staccato 8th notes, and the "B" section consists of fast 16th notes played on the G string. The opening 4 measures and the "A" section are in E♭ major, and the "B" section is in the relative minor (C minor).
20	D major	Allegretto	Carlo Bignami	Caprice 20 is famous for the use of the D string as a drone, backdropping a lyrical melody on the A and E strings, imitating a bagpipe. This is followed by a rapid sixteenth note passage with trills and flying staccato.
21	A major	Amoroso/Presto	Antonio Bazzini	Caprice 21 begins with a very expressive, aria-like melody played in double-stopped sixths. This is followed by a section of rapid up-bow staccato.
22	F major	Marcato	Luigi Alliani	Caprice 22 explores many types of double and triple stops with louré bowing, then implementing various elements of slurred staccato, slurred tremolos and strings crossings.
23	E♭ major	Posato/Minore/Posato	–	Caprice No. 23 begins with a melody in octaves in E♭. The middle, contrasting section is a formidable exercise in string crossings: it requires the violinist to play patterns of three sixteenth notes on the G string and then cross quickly to play one on the E string, and then back to the G string, all at a quick tempo.
24	A minor	Tema: Quasi presto/variazioni I–XI/Finale	Nicolò Paganini, sepolto pur troppo (to my self, regrettably buried).	The theme from Caprice No. 24 is well known; it has been used as the basis for many pieces by a wide variety of composers. This caprice uses a wide range of highly advanced techniques such as tremendously fast scales and arpeggios, double and triple stops, left hand pizzicato, parallel octaves and tenths, rapid shifting, and string crossings.

== Scores ==
- Critical edition by Franco Gulli (Ed. Curci, 1982)
- Critical edition by Renato de Barbieri (Urtext, 1990)

== Complete set / commercial recordings ==
- In 1940, to celebrate the centenary of Paganini's death, the complete set in the arrangement for violin and piano by Ferdinand David was recorded by the 20-year-old Austrian violinist Ossy Renardy (pseudonym of Oskar Reiss), with Walter Robert on piano (78 rpm's, RCA Victor; CD reprint by Biddulph). This was the world premiere recording of any version of the 24 Caprices. Renardy had played the solo violin version of the 24 in his Carnegie Hall debut the previous October. In 1953, shortly before his untimely death, Renardy recorded the 24 again (on Paganini's Guarnieri del Gesù violin, 'Il Cannone'), in the same arrangement by David, with Eugene Helmer accompanying (2LPs, Remington R-99-146 & R-99-152).
- In 1947, Ruggiero Ricci made the first complete recording of the 24 Caprices in their original version (Decca). Ricci later made further recordings, as stated below:
  - I) 1947 | 2LPs | Decca LK.4025 Nos.1–12; LXT.2588 Nos.13–24 -mono-; 1950 reprint | 2LPs | London Decca LL.264 Nos.1–12; LL.252 Nos.13–24 mono (London, July 1947)
  - II) 1959 | LP | Decca LXT.5569 -mono- / SXL.2194 -stereo- (Victoria Hall, Geneva, 1–9 April 1959)
  - III) 1973 | LP | Vox Turnabout TV-S 34528 | + premiere recording of Caprice d'adieu in E major, MS 68 (USA, 1973)
  - IV) 1978 | 2LP | Price-Less C–93042 (CD reprint: Price-Less D12179) | "Golden Jubilee" – recorded direct-to-disc at Soundstage Recording Studio, Toronto, Canada | + Caprice d'adieu in E major, MS 68 + Duo merveille in C major, MS 6 (Toronto, 1978)
  - V) 1988 | CD | Radio Vaticana 061–003 / Biddulph LAW 016 | performed on Paganini's Guarneri del Gesù "Il Cannone" (Genova, 16–20 April 1988)
  - VI) 1998 | CD | Dynamic CDS244 | 80th Birthday Concert, live in Szeged Synagogue, Hungary | version for violin and orchestra by Laszlo Meszlény (Nos.1–23) and Chris Nicholls (No.24), based on the piano accompaniment composed by Robert Schumann (Hungary, 17 May 1998)
  - VII) 1982 | LaserDisc-NTSC | One Eleven, Ltd. URS-V-91610 | 69 mins. | BBC Scotland, Live television performance (p)1991
  - VIII) 1987 | VHS-NTSC | Shar Products Company RR–1 (Michigan University, 10 January 1987) | unedited performance
- Other violinists have since recorded the complete set (listed in alphabetical order):
  - ACCARDO, Salvatore (1st rec: RCA Italia, 1970 / 2nd rec: DGG, 1977 / 3rd rec: Foné, 2002)
  - de BARBIERI, Renato (Fonit Cetra Italia, 1981) – from the original Paganini's manuscript
  - BARTON-PINE, Rachel (Avie, 2017)
  - BECKER-BENDER, Tanja (Hyperion, 2007)
  - BERICK, Yehonatan (Equilibrium, 2014)
  - BERMAN, Pavel (iClassical Academy, Italy 2018) - complete set of all 24 Caprices on video; instructional lessons and performances)
  - BRADLEY, Desmond (Classics for Pleasure Ltd / EMI, 1973 -self produced LP-)
  - CHUMACHENCO, Nicolas (Edelweiss, 1982)
  - DEGO, Francesca (Italian issue – DGG, 2012)
  - DUEÑAS, María (DGG, 2025) + further composers incl.: Berlioz, Cervelló, Kreisler, Ortiz, Saint-Saëns, Sarasate, Wieniawski.
  - EHNES, James (1st rec: Telarc, 1995 / 2nd rec: Onyx, 2009) – unedited performance, each caprice recorded in a single take
  - ERLIH, Devy (Adès, 1967 / CD reprint, 1987) -selection of 19 from the 24 Caprices: Nos. 2, 3, 8, 22 & 23 are not included
  - FANFONI, Luca (Aulicus Classics, 2022) -24 + 1 Caprices
  - FEDOTOV, Maxim (Russian and Japanese issue – Triton, 1996)
  - FISCHER, Julia (Decca Classics, 2008/09)
  - GARRETT, David (DGG, 1996) – w. Bruno Canino, playing the Robert Schumann piano accompaniment version for Nos. 1–23
  - GITLIS, Ivry (Philips, 1976) – first approved release: 2007
  - GRINGOLTS, Ilya (Orchid Classics, 2012)
  - HADELICH, Augustin (Warner Classics, 2017/8)
  - IBRAGIMOVA, Alina (Hyperion, 2021)
  - KALER, Ilya (Naxos, 1992)
  - KAMIO, Mayuko (Japanese issue – BMG/RCA Victor Red Seal, 2009) – CD+DVD features an interview with Kamio
  - KAVAKOS, Leonidas (Dynamic, 1989/90)
  - KAWACIUK, Ivan (Supraphon, 1959 - released on: Ultraphon, 1994)
  - KINGA, Augustin (RovenRecords, 2016)
  - KOELMAN, Rudolf (Wiediscon, 1996 / CD reprint: Hänssler, 2003) – 1996 live recording
  - KOVÁČ, Tibor (Gramola, 1999)
  - MALIKIAN, Ara (Warner Classics Apex, 2002) – Warner claim this to be the first complete recording made of the Caprices, following the repetition marks included in the autograph score. Total playing time: 100'25"
  - MALOV, Sergey (Solo Musica, 2021)
  - MARKOV, Alexander (DVD Warner Music Vision + CD Erato, 1989) – 'live' recording, 3 May 1989. DVD Film directed by Bruno Monsaingeon
  - MIDORI, Gotō (Sony Classical, 1988)
  - MILANOVA, Vanya (Simax, 1985)
  - MILENKOVICH, Stefan (Dynamic, 2002/03) – 2-CD set with 'the complete music for solo violin'
  - MINTZ, Shlomo (DGG, 1981)
  - NOFERINI, Roberto (Tactus, 2014) - violino storico
  - PAETSCH, Michaela (Teldec, 1987)
  - PAPAVRAMI, Tedi (Aeon, 1997 + 2001) – 2-CD set with two different recordings: 1997 studio version + 19 April 2001, 'live' in Tokyo
  - PASQUIER, Régis (Auvidis Valois, 1991)
  - PERLMAN, Itzhak (EMI, 1972)
  - PINEAU-BENOIS, François (Erol – ER 200058, 2024)
  - POULET, Gérard Georges (French issue – LP Deesse DDLX 178, 1979)
  - RABIN, Michael (Capitol, 1958)
  - ROGLIANO, Marco (Tactus, 2000)
  - SATO, Shunsuke (Japanese issue – Universal Classics, 2009) – performed on pure gut strings
  - SHIMIZU, Takashi (Japanese issue – Platz, 1990)
  - SOCHARD, François (NomadMusic, 2024)
  - SPIVAKOVSKY, Tossy (Omega Classics, 1966) – w. Lester Taylor, playing the Robert Schumann piano accompaniment for Nos. 1–23
  - STADLER, Sergei (Melodiya, 1983)
  - STOICA, Razvan (Aliud -private release-, 2014)
  - TCHAKERIAN, Sonig (Arts Music, 2002)
  - VASILE, Cornelia (Electrecord, 1969 - selection: DGG, 1970 - live: Rhine Classics, 1970)
  - YANG, In Mo (DGG, 2018)
  - ZALAI, Antal (Budapest, 4–13 August 2015)
  - ZEHETMAIR, Thomas (1st rec: Teldec, 1992 / 2nd rec: ECM Records, 2007)
  - ZHISLIN, Grigori (Dante Productions LYSC 002, 1997)
  - ZIMMERMANN, Frank Peter (EMI, 1984/85) – plays the first 12 Caprices on a Stradivari of 1706 and the remainder on a Stradivari of 1684
  - ZUKOFSKY, Paul (Vanguard Classics, 1970) – so-called 'authentic' performance based on the original manuscript

== Complete set / live, not commercial recordings ==
- Madoyan, Nikolay (live recording | 4 November 2003, San Donato Church Genoa, Italy)

== Arrangements ==
=== Violin and Piano ===
- version of No. 24 by composer himself, for violin and piano or guitar published separately as Variazioni di bravura
- piano accompaniments for Nos. 1–23 by Robert Schumann (1855)
- arrangement of Nos. 1–24 by Ferdinand David for violin and piano (c. 1860)
- version of the 24 caprices "avec accompagnement de pianoforte" by John Liptrot Hatton (1870)
- arrangement of No. 13 by Jenő Hubay (c. 1925)
- arrangement of Nos. 13, 20 and 24 by Fritz Kreisler (1911)
- arrangement of Nos. 17 and 24 by Leopold Auer (1922)
- arrangement of No. 6 by George Enescu
- arrangement of No. 9 "La chasse" by Jacques Thibaud
- arrangement of No. 9 and 23 by Florizel von Reuter
- arrangement of No. 9 by Albert Spalding (1918)
- arrangement of Nos. 17 (1926), 9, 13, 19 (1941) and 24 (1918) by Adolf Busch
- arrangement (recomposition with new variations) of No. 24 by Mischa Elman
- arrangement of Nos. 13, 22, 14 (Vol. I), Nos. 21, 15, 9 (Vol. II) and Nos. 20, 24 (Vol. III) by Mario Pilati (1935)
- arrangement of Nos. 13, 17, 24 by Zino Francescatti (1950s)
- re-composition of No. 20 as Concert Caprice by Max Rostal (1955)
- arrangement of No. 24 by Eduard Tubin

=== Violin and string orchestra ===
- arrangement of Nos. 13, 24 by Jascha Heifetz, No. 24 is based on Leopold Auer's piano arrangement (1940s)
- arrangement of Nos. 2, 21, 20, 9, 24 as Five Paganini Caprices by Edison Denisov (1985)
- string orchestra accompaniment for Nos. 1–24 by Giedrius Kuprevičius

=== Viola solo ===
- arrangement of Nos. 5 and 13 by William Primrose (1933/34)
- arrangement of Nos. 1–24 by Emanuel Vardi (1965)

=== Viola and piano ===
- arrangements of No.17 by William Primrose and No. 24 by David Stimer

=== Cello solo ===
- arrangement of Nos. 9, 14, 17 by Yo-Yo Ma (1981/82)

=== Cello and piano ===
- arrangement of Nos. 13, 20 and 24 by Fritz Kreisler (1911) / re-arranged by Yo-Yo Ma for cello and piano

=== Flute solo ===
- arrangement of Nos. 1–24 by Jules Herman (1902)
- arrangement of Nos. 1–24 by Patrick Gallois (DGG, 1990/91)
- arrangement of Nos. 1–24 by Roberto Pasquini (Da Vinci Publishing, 2024)

=== Guitar solo ===
- arrangement of No. 24 by John Williams
- arrangement of Nos. 1–24 by Eliot Fisk (1990/91)
- arrangement of No. 24 by Marcin Patrzalek

=== Electric guitar solo ===
- arrangement of Nos. 1–24 by Steve Jeffrey 2023
- various caprices arranged and performed by Luke Fortini

=== Chamber orchestra ===
- arrangement of No. 24 by Adolf Busch (1918?)

=== Clarinet and jazz band ===
- arrangement of No. 24 by Skip Martin and Benny Goodman (1941)

== Complete set recordings of arrangements ==
- Berman, Pavel (Classica HD, 2013) – Orchestra dei Talenti Musicali – live, Biella, Teatro Sociale, 2013 (version with String Orchestra by Giedrius Kuprevičius)
- Boyd, Bonita (flute) (Fleur De Son Classics, 2000) – arranged by Jules Herman for flute
- Drahos, Béla (flute) (Hungarian issue – Radioton, 1996) – arranged by Jules Herman for flute. Première recording of the 24 Caprices performed on the flute
- Fisk, Eliot (guitar) (Nimbus Records, 1991) – arrangement by Fisk for guitar
- Gallois, Patrick (flute) (DGG, 1991) – arranged by Gallois for flute
- Pasquini, Roberto (flute) (Da Vinci, 2024) – arrangement by Pasquini for flute
- Slapin, Scott (viola) (Eroica Classical Recordings, 2008) – arranged for viola
- Vardi, Emanuel (viola) (Epic SC 6049, 1965) – arranged for viola. Recorded on a 17" Dodd viola in Vardi's home studio
- Wihan String Quartet (Nimbus Alliance, 2009) – arranged by William Zinn for string quartet (Wihan SQ: Leos Cepicky and Jan Schulmeister, violins / Jiri Zigmund, viola / Ales Kasprik, cello)

== Original works, based on Paganini's Caprices ==
Especially for compositions in the form of "Variations" see the related article: Caprice No. 24 (Paganini)#Variations on the theme.

=== Violin solo ===
- 9 variaciones sobre el capricho núm. 24 de Paganini by Manuel Quiroga (1928)
- 12 variaciones sobre el capricho núm. 24 de Paganini by Manuel Quiroga (1942)
- Paganiniana, Variations for violin solo (Tema: Caprice 24; Var. I: Caprice 3; Var. II: Le Streghe; Var. III: Caprice 6; Var. IV: Caprice 14; Var. V: Caprice 21) by Nathan Milstein (1954)
- 50 Caprice Variations (on Caprice No. 24) by George Rochberg (1970)

=== Violin and piano ===
- Paganini Variations on the 24th caprice by Eugène Ysaÿe (posthumous ed. 1960)
- Trois caprices de Paganini Op. 40 (re-composition of Nos. 20, 21 and 24) by Karol Szymanowski (1918; rev. 1926)
- Trois caprices de Paganini Op. 97 (re-composition of Nos. 10, 13 and 22) by Darius Milhaud (1927)
- Paganini Variations Op.25 for Violin and Piano ('ad libitum') dedicated to Ruggiero Ricci by Paolo Pessina (1997)

=== Violin and orchestra ===
- Capriccio dei Capricci (da Paganini, 2 Studi per orchestra di virtuosi), Op. 50, by Franco Mannino (1967)

=== Piano solo ===
- Etudes after Paganini Caprices, Op. 3 (on Caprices Nos. 5, 9, 11, 13, 19, 16) by Robert Schumann (1832)
- 6 Concert Etudes after Paganini Caprices, Op. 10 (on Caprices Nos. 14, 6, 10, 4, 2, 3) by Robert Schumann (1833)
- Études d'exécution transcendente d'après Paganini, S. 140 (on Caprices Nos. 5+6, 17, 1, 9, 24) by Franz Liszt (1838/40)
- Grandes études de Paganini, S. 141 (on Caprices Nos. 6, 17, 1, 9, 24) by Franz Liszt (1851)
- Variations on a Theme by Paganini, Op. 35 (Book I & II)] (on Caprice No. 24) by Johannes Brahms (1862/63)
- Sonatina Canonica in E♭ major (on Caprices Nos. 20, 19, 11, 14) by Luigi Dallapiccola (1942/43), dedicated to Pietro Scarpini

=== Two pianos ===
- Variations on a Theme by Paganini (on Caprice No. 24) by Witold Lutosławski (1941)

=== Piano and orchestra ===
- Rhapsody on a Theme of Paganini, Op. 43, (on Caprice No. 24) by Sergei Rachmaninoff (1934)
- Wariacje na temat Paganiniego (on Caprice No. 24) by Witold Lutosławski (1941; rescored 1979)

=== Orchestra ===
- re-composition of various Paganini's works as Paganiniana, Op. 65: I. Allegro agitato (on Caprices Nos. 5, 12 and fragments from Nos. 16, 19) by Alfredo Casella (1942)
- Paganini Variations, Op. 26 (on Caprice No. 24) by Boris Blacher (1947)
