= I palpiti =

- Theme and variations on Rossini's "Di tanti palpiti" from the opera Tancredi
- by Niccolò Paganini
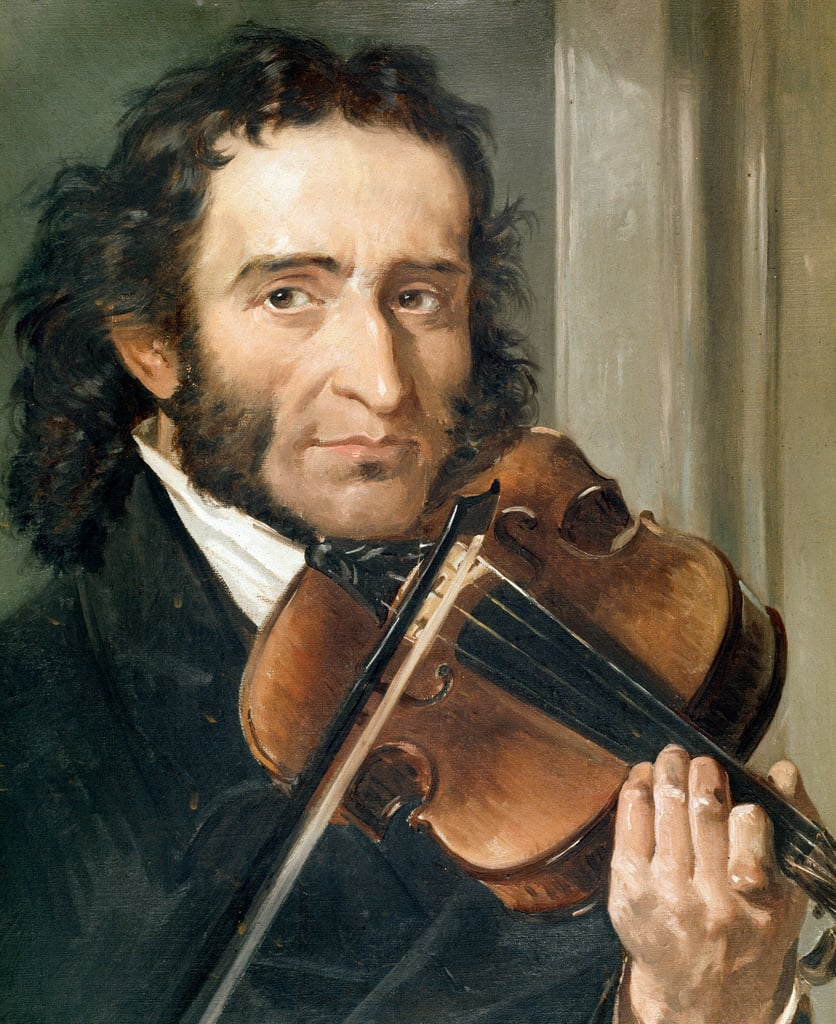
- Portrait of the composer
- Key: B♭ major
- Catalogue: MS 77
- Opus: 17
- Year: Probably 1819
- Related: Cavatina "Di tanti palpiti" from Rossini's opera Tancredi
- Duration: 11 minutes approximately
- Scoring: Violin and orchestra

I palpiti, Op. 13, MS 77 (from Italian: Heartbeats), sometimes also entitled Variations on "Di tanti palpiti" from Rossini's "Tancredi" (Note: I palpiti never had a formal title in his lifetime. Programs often listed the piece as Larghetto, Recitative, and Variations on the Cavatina "Di tanti palpiti" or Grand Sonata with Variations upon Rossini's admired Cavatina "Di tanti palpiti". Nowadays, the piece often uses a descriptive title, with any variation from Introduction (or Theme) and Variations for Violin and Orchestra in B-flat major on the Theme "Di tanti palpiti" from Tancredi by Gioachino Rossini.) for clarity, is a composition for violin and orchestra by Italian composer Niccolò Paganini. Presumably written in 1819, it was published posthumously and has become one of Paganini's best-known sets of variations.

== Background ==
The earliest surviving documents attesting to public performances of I palpiti date back to April 1828. The general scholarly consensus is that the work was composed in 1819, the year in which Niccolò Paganini’s relationship with Gioachino Rossini became closer. This connection likely inspired Paganini to compose two other sets of variations on Rossinian themes around the same time: the Variations on “Non più mesta” (1819) and the Sonata a Preghiera (1819). He continued to draw on Rossini’s music in later years, as seen in the Sonata amorosa galante (1830). I palpiti was dedicated to "His Excellence the Lord Count Giuseppe Archinto", a nobleman and political figure contemporary with Paganini.

Although the exact date of the premiere is unknown, documented performances indicate that it was frequently played between 1828 and 1832 in several major European cities, including Frankfurt, Vienna, Prague, Dresden, Paris, and London. After Paganini retired from the stage and following his death in 1840, the work remained unpublished for some time, as he had been reluctant to allow their publication. Eventually, publishers obtained a number of his manuscripts and issued them in 1851 as part of a series of nine opus numbers. I palpiti appeared as the eighth in this collection. Given Paganini’s fame across Europe, the work circulated quickly. It was published simultaneously by Schonenberger in Paris, B. Schott's Söhne in London, and Casa Ricordi in Milan.

Several manuscripts survive today. The only extant autograph manuscript is preserved at the Biblioteca Casanatense in Rome and consists of the solo violin part in A major. As was customary, the remaining orchestral parts and scores were prepared by copyists, including Paganini’s son, Achille Paganini. The Casanatense also holds many additional manuscript copies, including individual parts and a full orchestral score, likely produced after the composer’s death.

== Structure ==
Scoring of I palpiti
Solo	Orchestra			
Solo	Woodwinds	Brass	Percussion	Strings
Violin	1 flute	2 horns	Bass drum	Violins I & II
	2 oboes	2 trumpets	Cymbals	Violas
	2 bassoons			Cellos
				Double basses

The composition lasts approximately 11 minutes and comprises 204 bars. It is a concertante work for solo violin with orchestral accompaniment. Like many other compositions by Niccolò Paganini, it is structured as a theme and variations, in which the variations are designed to showcase the performer’s technical virtuosity on the violin rather than to provide substantial melodic development. The original thematic material is taken from Gioachino Rossini's opera Tancredi (1813), originally first performed at the Teatro Fenice in Venice. It is the cavatina sung by Tancredi at his entrance, in Act I, Scene 2.

The piece is in the key of B♭ major. The solo violin part, however, is notated in A major to facilitate certain fingerings and position changes for the performer. To achieve this, Paganini employs scordatura, a technique that involves retuning the violin’s strings so that the open strings sound in the desired key. This was a characteristic device in Paganini’s oeuvre and appears frequently in his works. In this case, the instrument is tuned up by a semitone, so that the open strings sound as A♭, E♭, B♭, and F.

The section list is as follows:

- Introduction. Larghetto cantabile
- Recitativo con grande espressione
- Theme. Andantino
- Variation I
- Variation II. Un poco lento
- Variation III. Quasi presto

== Recordings ==
The following is a list of recordings of the composition:

Recordings of Niccolò Paganini's I palpiti
Violin	Conductor (or instrumentalist)	Orchestra	Date of recording	Place of recording	Label	Notes
Salvatore Accardo	Charles Dutoit	London Philharmonic Orchestra	January 1976	Barking Town Hall, London, UK	Deutsche Grammophon	
Massimo Quarta	Stefania Redaelli (piano)	—	September 1998	Dynamic's, Genoa, Italy	Dynamic	
Mario Hossen	Ludmil Petrov (piano)	—	March 2017	Casino Baumgarten, Vienna, Austria	Dynamic	
