= Lecat =

Lecat can be both a middle name and a surname. Notable people with the name include:

- César Lecat de Bazancourt, French military historian
- Claire Lecat (born 1965), French judoka
- François Lecat (born 1993), Belgian volleyball player
- Jean-Philippe Lecat (1935–2011), French politician
- Jelles de Lecat, Dutch pirate
- Olivier Lecat, French volleyball player
- Stéphane Lecat (born 1971), French long-distance swimmer
