= Madoyan =

Madoyan (Armenian: Մադոյան) is an Armenian surname. Notable people with the surname include:

- Artin Madoyan (1904–?), Armenian communist politician
- Ghukas Madoyan (1906–1975), Armenian Soviet army officer
- Nikolay Madoyan (born 1973), Armenian classical violinist
