= Nikolay Madoyan =

Armenian violinist (born 1973)

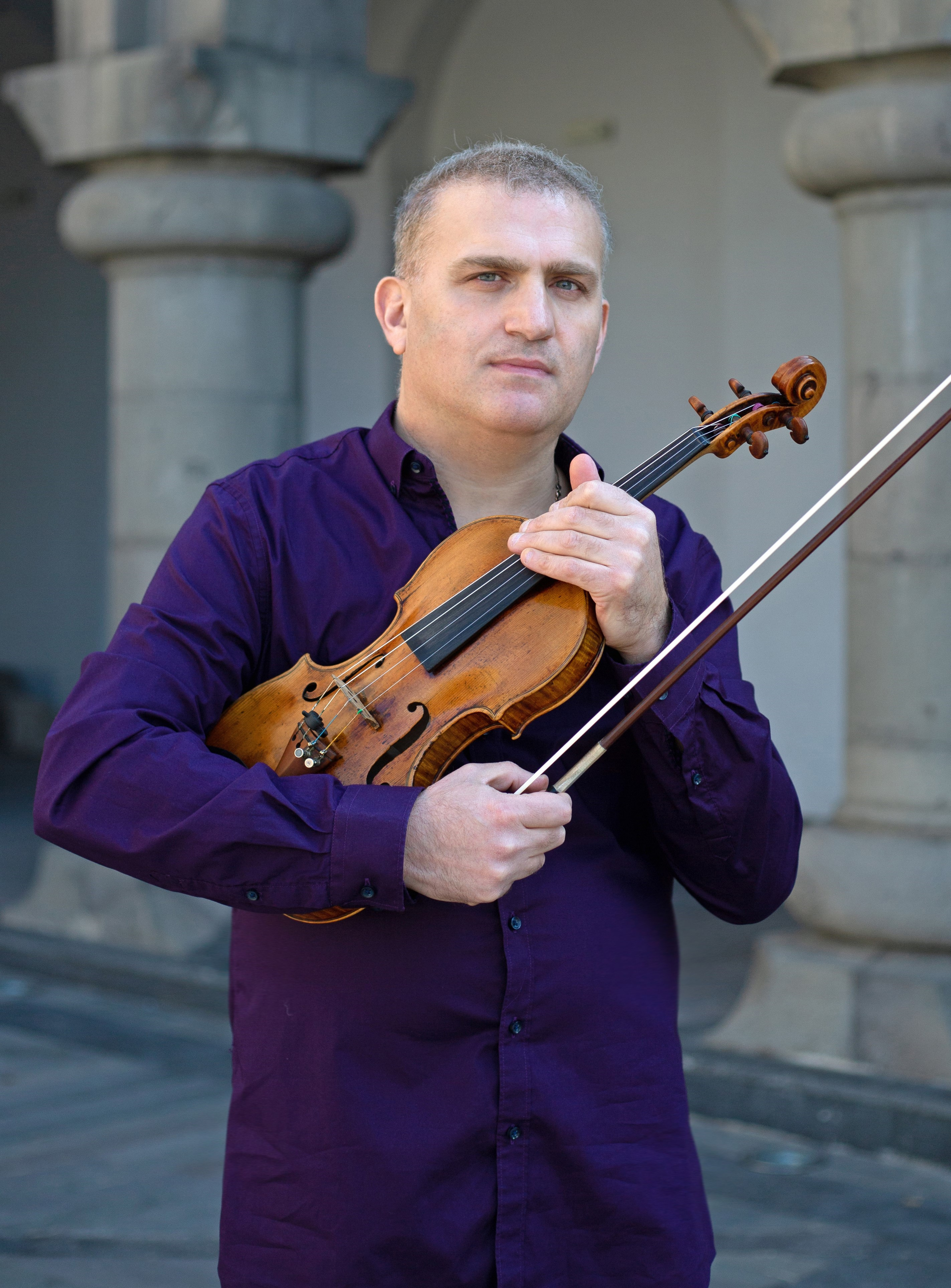

Background information
- Born: 1 June 1973 (age 53); Yerevan, Armenia
- Genres: Classical music
- Occupations: Musician; professor
- Instrument: Violin
- Years active: 1987–present
- Labels: Naxos Records; Kontrapunkt; Cowbell Music; Ambitus Musikproduktion
- Website: www.nikolaymadoyan.com

Nikolay Madoyan (also spelled Nikolai Madojan, Armenian: Նիկոլայ Մադոյան; born 1 June 1973 in Yerevan) is an Armenian-German virtuoso violinist known for large-scale music projects and an international career spanning major orchestras and concert halls. He has performed under renowned conductors including Kurt Masur, Claudio Abbado, and Valery Gergiev, and appeared at venues such as London’s Royal Festival Hall, Wigmore Hall, Berliner Philharmonie, and Amsterdam’s Concertgebouw.

Madoyan's continuous 33-hour performance of 59 world classics from different styles and epochs has been entered in the Guinness World Records book.

He won first prizes at the All-Union (USSR) International Violin Competition in Novosibirsk at age 15, the International Kulenkampf Competition in Cologne, and received laureate awards at the IV Karol Lipiński and Henryk Wieniawski International Competition for Young Violinists. His album recordings have received international critical acclaim from major classical music critics and media, including BBC Music Magazine, Gramophone, and The Strad.

He performed all six violin concertos by Niccolò Paganini from memory in a single concert and toured Europe with recitals of the complete 24 Caprices, using the composer's original bowings and performing without intermission, with The Strad describing his playing as featuring “rapid-fire runs, audacious jumps, and masterful technical prowess.”

Madoyan holds two doctoral degrees in violin performance, gives masterclasses internationally, and has received the honorary title of Merited Artist of Armenia along with several state distinctions. He studied with Zakhar Bron, Miriam Solovieff and Isaac Stern.

Paganini all six violin concertos

Nikolay Madoyan - Paganini 24 caprices played live in one concert without interval

== Early life and education ==
Nikolay Madoyan was admitted to the Tchaikovsky Music School in Yerevan, where he studied under the patronage of Professor Hrachya Bogdanyan. Impressed by the 13-year-old talent, violin professor Zakhar Bron invited Madoyan to continue his studies at the Novosibirsk Glinka Conservatory. In the following years, Madoyan won the 1st Prize at the All-Union Competition for Young Violinists and became the laureate and the winner of the Special Jury Prize at the IV Karol Lipiński and Henryk Wieniawski International Competition for Young Violinists. in Poland.

Together with Prof. Bron's wunderkind class, at the invitation of the Lübeck Music Academy, Madoyan moved to live and study in Germany, where he made a debut at the Schleswig-Holstein Music Festival with the Mariinsky Theater Orchestra conducted by Valery Gergiev. He appeared in the Five Young Top Talents series along with V. Repin, M. Vengerov, N. Luganski and E. Kissin, playing Beethoven's Violin Concerto at the Concertgebouw Amsterdam and other European venues.

In 1991, Madoyan won the 1st prize at the International Kullenkampf Competition of Violinists in Cologne, Germany. Moreover, he became the laureate at the Tokyo International Competition of Violinists and was awarded the Special Prize for the Best Performer of the Japanese Work.

Madoyan took master classes from violinists Miriam Solovieff and Isaac Stern, with whom he would perform together in France. He holds Doctor of Music degree (D. Mus.) in Violin Performance from Berlin University of the Arts and from the Yerevan State Conservatory, where he was bestowed the title of Honorary Professor.

== Career ==
After graduating from the Lübeck Academy, Nikolay Madoyan launched a series of concert tours in Germany with the London Mozart Players chamber orchestra conducted by Matthias Bamert. Then he had a concert in the United Kingdom with the Novosibirsk Philharmonic Orchestra, where, among other works he played the Tchaikovsky Violin Concerto conducted by Arnold Katz. Madoyan's performances with the Netherlands and Rotterdam Symphonic Orchestras and Cologne Chamber Orchestra were in the highlight of the local media. Madoyan was the founder of the Madoyan-Westenholz-Denitzen trio, which successfully toured Europe, featuring works by Shostakovich, Schubert, Beethoven and Ravel.

Collaboration of Nikolay Madoyan and the pianist Elizabeth Westenholz resulted in CDs, released by Kontrapunkt and Cowbell, featuring violin sonatas by Mendelson, Grieg, Schubert, Prokofiev, Strauss and Franck. Madoyan’s recordings have been reviewed in European newspapers and magazines, with Gramophone praising his natural phrasing and his collaboration with the pianist on Prokofiev’s, Grieg’s, and Schubert’s Violin Sonatas.

In 2022 Madoyan signed with Naxos Records and released his debut album Armenian Brilliance in October 2023. The release received high praise from critics, including the BBC Music Magazine, Pizzicato and American Record Guide.

“On this album, he shines with short pieces that each have a substantial character despite their limited duration. With his sometimes elegant, sometimes dreamy, sometimes robustly virtuosic playing, the violinist is able to extract many details from the works.” (Pizzicato) “The performers take care of their sound, and the playing is consistently professional and mature, with good taste and style. It is an admirable project.” (American Record Guide)

=== Performances ===
Madoyan's repertoire includes an extensive range of violin works. He performed all six Paganini's Violin Concertos from memory in one concert.

He has performed with a number of world's best symphony orchestras and conductors such as Helmut Muller-Bruhl, Richard Hickox, Kurt Mazur, Frans Brüggen, Claudio Abbado, Arnold Katz, Dmitri Kitayenko, Valery Gergiev, Leopold Hager, Richard Dufallo, Karen Durgaryan, Kees Bakels, Nikolai Alekseyev, Vasily Sinaisky, Erich Vechter, George A. Albrecht, Janos Furst, Gianluca Marcianò, and many more.

The list of concert halls where he has performed includes Teatro di San Carlo, Tivoli Concert Hall, Concertgebouw Amsterdam, Royal Festival Hall, Verdi Theater in Milan, Berlin Kammermusiksaal, Birmingham Symphony Hall, Edinburgh Queen's Hall, Glasgow Royal Concert Hall, Berliner Philharmonie, Hamburg Musikhalle, Stuttgart Beethoven Hall, Duesseldorf Robert-Schumann-Saal, Vienna Kammermusiksaal, Reid Concert Hall, Concertgebouw Brugge, Belgrade Philharmonia, Tokyo NHK Hall, Beijing Big Concert Hall, Montreal Place des Arts, Zurich Tonhalle, Aram Khachaturian Concert Hall, Kuhmo Concert Hall, Big Concert Hall of Moscow Conservatory, West Road Concert Hall, Berliner Philharmonie, and many more.

In 2025/2026 season Nikolay Madoyan has embarked on a world tour performing the 24 Caprices by Niccolo Paganini which, due to their complexity, are rarely played in their entirety during recitals. The 24 Caprices tour was launched in February at the Berlin Philharmonic, followed at Sala Verdi in Milan, and then other venues in countries such as France, Spain, Switzerland, USA, Canada and Japan.

== Prizes and awards ==
=== Prizes ===
- 1988 – Laureate and Special Prize winner of Spectators and Journalists at the IV Karol Lipiński and Henryk Wieniawski International Competition for Young Violinists
- 1988 – 1st prize in the All-Union Violin Competition (Novosibirsk, USSR)
- 1991 – 1st prize in the International Kulenkampf Competition of Violinists (Cologne, Germany)
- 1992 – Laureate and Special Prize winner for Best Performer of the Japanese Work at Tokyo International Competition of Violinists (Tokyo, Japan)
- 2003 – President Prize for the high performance of 15 violin miniatures of outstanding composers of 17–20 centuries (Armenia)

=== Awards ===
- 1995 – Medal of the Coat of Arms of the City of Yerevan
- 2004 – Merited Artist of Armenia
- 2004 – Gold Medal of the Ministry of Culture, Armenia
- 2017 – Guinness World Record – The Longest Violin Performance, “Officially Amazing” – 33 hours, 2 minutes and 41 seconds, United Kingdom
- 2023 – Knight of the Centenary of Violin award (International Expert Committee, Australia)

== Discography ==
- 1990: Die Meisterschüler von Zakhar Bron. (N. Madoyan, D. Garett, M. Vengerov, V. Repin). Label Ambitus Musikproduktion
- 1994: Sergei Prokofiev: Violin Sonatas / Five Melodies. Label Kontrapunkt
- 1995: Grieg: Violin Sonatas. Label Kontrapunkt
- 1997: Mendelssohn-Bartoldy: Complete Sonatas for Violin and Piano. Label Kontrapunkt
- 1998: Schubert: Works for Violin and Piano. Label Kontrapunkt
- 2000: Cesar Franck: Sonata F Major / Richard Strauss: Sonata E Flat Major. Label Kontrapunkt
- 2007: Favourite Encores. Label CowBell Music
- 2023: Armenian Brilliance. Label Naxos Records
