= Tedi Papavrami =

Albanian violinist

Tedi Papavrami (born 13 May 1971) is an Albanian violinist.

== Biography ==
Papavrami was born in Tirana in 1971 and started to play the violin at the age of four or five. He studied violin with his father, Robert Papavrami. At age 8, he performed Pablo de Sarasate's Airs Bohémiens with the Tirana Philharmonic Orchestra, and three years later performed Paganini's first violin concerto.

In 1982, on the suggestion of flautist Alain Marion, the French government offered Papvrami a scholarship to study at the Conservatoire de Paris under the direction of Pierre Amoyal. In 1985 he won the International Violin Competition Rodolfo Lipizer Prize in Gorizia and in 1986 he won the First Prize of the Conservatory of Paris. In 1987 he received a degree from the Lausanne Conservatory.

Papavrami then continued his musical studies under the direction of Zino Francescatti and Viktoria Mullova. In 1992 he won the SACEM George Enescu Prize and in 1993, the first prize and special prize in the Pablo Sarasate International Violin Competition.

Papavrami appeared in the 2003 miniseries Les Liaisons dangereuses, playing Raphael Danceny. He has translated many of Ismail Kadare's literary works into French, starting in 2000.

Tedi Papavrami has played in Europe, South Africa, Turkey, Japan, and Israel, with the Bologna Orchestra, Bamberg Symphony, the Orchestre de Nice, the Orquesta Sinfónica de Galicia, the Orchestre Philharmonique de Liège, and the Orchestre de Paris. He has been conducted by orchestra directors such as Kurt Sanderling, Christopher Hogwood, Antonio Pappano, Louis Langrée, Gilbert Varga, Zdeněk Mácal, and Jean-Claude Casadesus.

He embarked on tour in Japan with Paganini's 24 Caprices for Solo Violin. Papavrami regularly plays chamber music with Philippe Bianconi, Hüseyin Sermet, Paul Meyer, and Raphaël Oleg.

He played for the film Provincial Chronicle (2009).

== Discography ==
- Prokofiev: Violin Concertos No. 1 and 2 & Sonata for Solo Violin (with the Polish National Radio Symphony Orchestra and Antoni Wit), Naxos, 1996.
- Paganini: 24 Caprices (recorded at the Théâtre des Quatres Saisons de Gradignan), Pan Classics, 1997.
- Ysaÿe: The Complete Sonatas for Solo Violin, Op. 27 & Sonata for 2 Violins (with Svetlin Roussev), Zigzag, 2014.
- Fauré & Franck: Sonates pour violon et piano (with Nelson Goerner), Alpha Records, 2017 (2016).
