= Le Chemin de fer (Alkan) =

Étude composed by Charles-Valentin Alkan

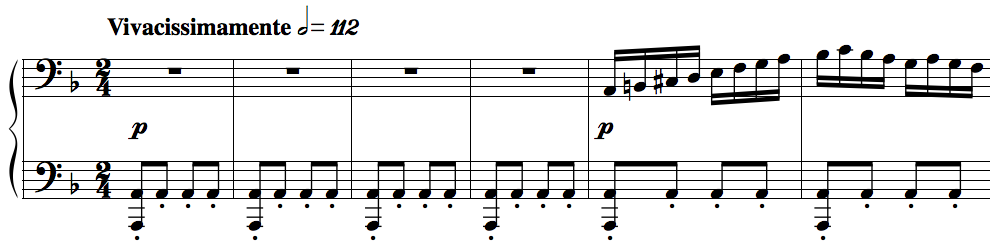
"Le Chemin de fer" is characterized by rapidly repeating bass notes, difficult to play and exacerbated by the extreme tempo.

"Le Chemin de fer" (French for "the railway" or "the railroad"), Op. 27, is a programmatic étude for piano composed by Charles-Valentin Alkan in 1844, frequently cited as the first musical representation of a railway. It is a perpetuum mobile composition at an extremely fast tempo, in D minor, and performance at tempo lasts approximately five minutes.

== Composition ==
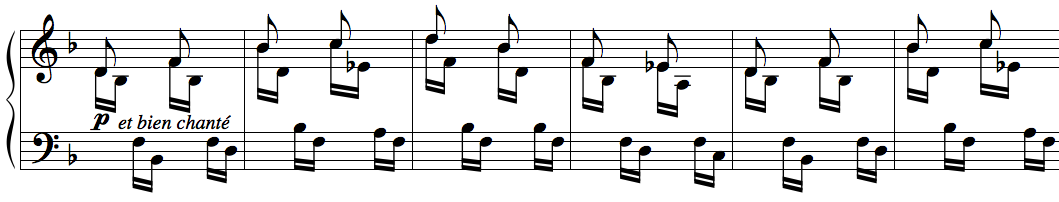
The "happy passengers" melody is not as thick as the main "locomotion" gauntlet.

The composition is marked vivacissimamente (extremely brisk, from vivace), 112 half notes per minute. The first theme is sixteenth notes accompanied by a repetitive ostinato bass in eighth notes, illustrating the fleeting steam locomotive. The second is a more lightweight melody that appears first in the submediant major, B-flat major, then in C major, still comprising just sixteenth notes, which depicts the happy journey of the passengers. The only respite from the torrent comes at the coda, in which the note durations lengthen and the piece comes to a close, portraying the train pulling into a station and the journey ending. The piece's length, in printing (506 measures), not performance (5 minutes), is humorously referred to as describing a very long trip.

== Reception ==
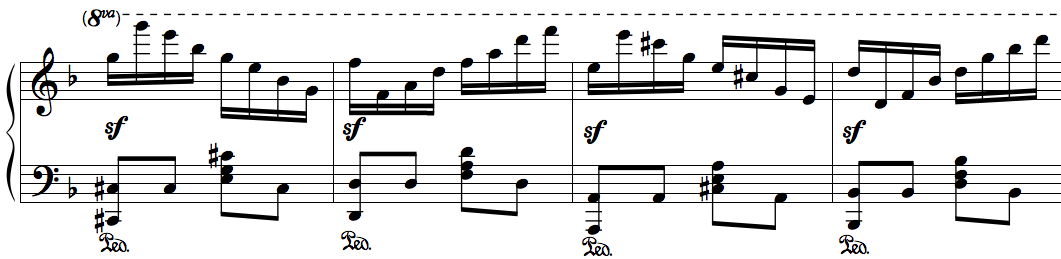
The musical climax, extremely intense and involved, is still played at the same astronomical speed.

The most recurrent criticism of the étude disparages its banal programmatic nature, and it has been rated very poorly compared with Alkan's other compositions. One writer dismisses it as "amusing", without technical innovations. Although Alkan demanded strict adherence to the metronome, one analysis of the extreme tempo showed that it is nearly impossible to play at the correct speed, and that at that speed the notes become impossible to distinguish. One published edition agrees with this statement, suggesting that Alkan's metronomic indications do not need to be taken too literally, and most analyses agree, one proposing that there is a printing error and it should be played half as fast (112 quarter notes per minute). The piece's historical accuracy has also been questioned, given that it was composed in 1844, a period in railway history when trains seldom travelled faster than 19 mph (30 km/h). Despite these denigrations, its joyful melody has been celebrated as a forerunner to Arthur Honegger's famous orchestral work, Pacific 231, which also represents a locomotive.

== Music ==
Complete recording (at tempo)
Complete recording at the original tempo

Beginning section (slow)
At half tempo
