= Chancellery of Orders and Medals of the Republic =

Government agency of Albania

- Kancelaria e Urdhrave dhe Medaljeve të Republikës
- Official logo

Agency overview
- Formed: December 26, 2024; 20 months ago
- Type: Orders and medals institution
- Jurisdiction: Albania
- Headquarters: Bulevardi "Dëshmorët e Kombit", Nr. 1, Tiranë
- Agency executive: Tomi Frashëri, Chancellor
- Parent department: Council of Ministers
- Website: kancelarium.al

The Chancellery of Orders and Medals of the Republic (Albanian: Kancelaria e Urdhrave dhe Medaljeve të Republikës; KUMR) is an Albanian state institution responsible for administering the country’s system of orders and medals. Headquartered in Tirana, it maintains official records of state decorations and oversees their administration, preservation and use.

== History ==
The Chancellery was established under Law No. 93/2022 "On Decorations in the Republic of Albania", which reorganized the country’s system of state honors. Its organization and functions were further regulated by Decision No. 819 of the Council of Ministers, on 26 December 2024.

Tomi Frashëri was appointed as the first Chancellor by Prime Minister Edi Rama, on 18 February 2025 and the institution’s organizational structure was approved on 20 June 2025.

The Chancellery maintains registers and archives of state decorations and their recipients, issues related documentation and oversees the preservation and proper use of orders and medals. It is also responsible for preserving Albania’s heraldic heritage and contributes to the coordination of official ceremonial and protocol activities.

== Organization ==
The Chancellery is headed by the Chancellor, who is appointed by the Prime Minister. Its collegiate body, the "College of Orders and Medals", consists of nine members, including representatives of the President, the Academy of Sciences, the State Protocol and the Council of Ministers.

== Orders and medals ==
The Chancellery administers Albania’s three national orders:

- Supreme Order of the Eagle
- Order of Skanderbeg
- Order of the Academic Oak

The honors system also includes presidential, prime-ministerial and ministerial medals awarded for distinguished merit and service in various fields.

== See also ==
- Orders, decorations, and medals of Albania
