= Elisabeth Westenholz =

Danish pianist and organist

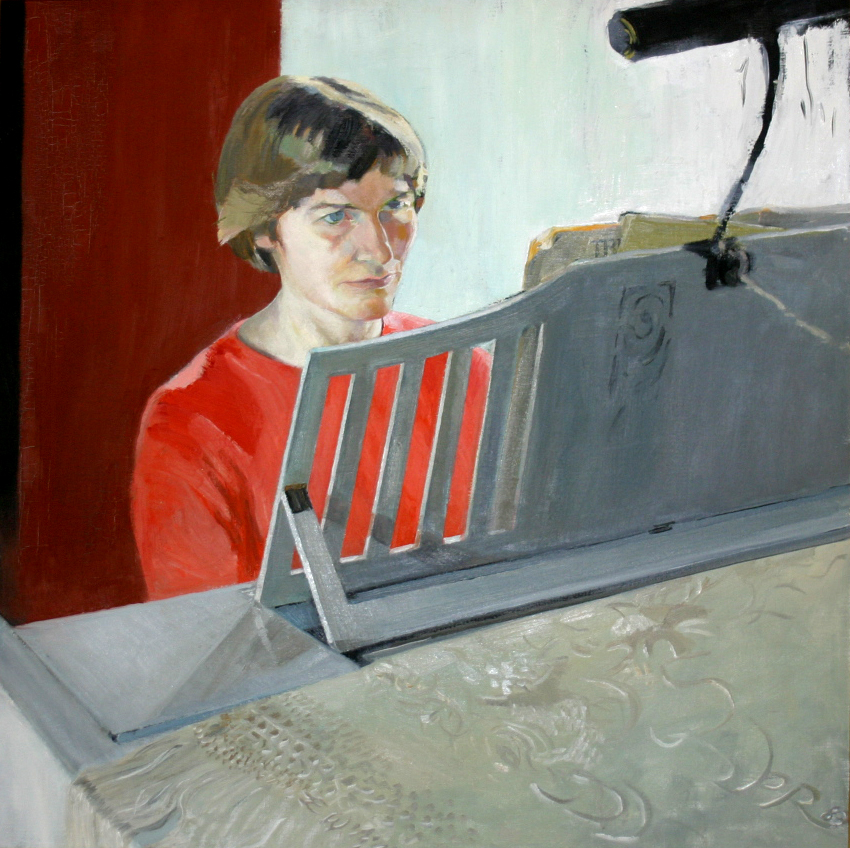
- Portrait of Westenholz, oil paint on canvas
- Born: 1942 (age 83–84); Copenhagen, Denmark
- Occupations: Pianist and Organist
- Awards: Danish Music Reviewers Prize; Carl Nielsen Prize; Tagea Brandt Rejselegat; Order of the Dannebrog; Gladsaxe Musikpris

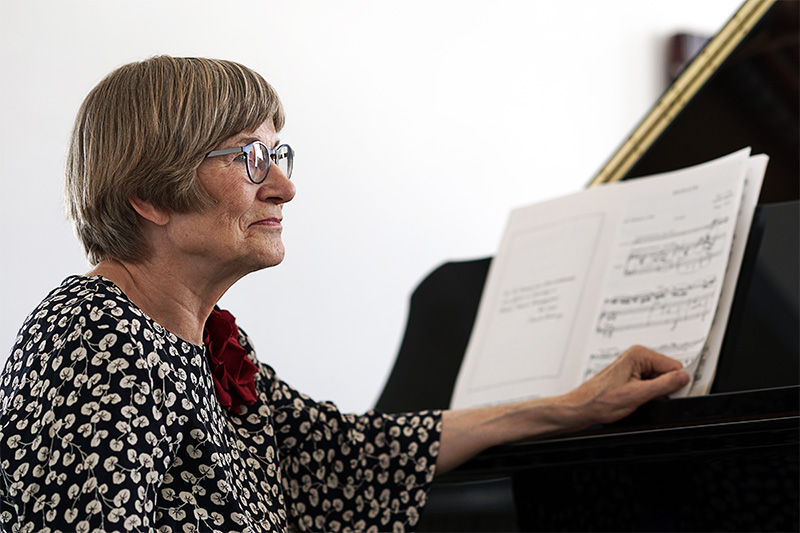
Elisabeth Westenholz at Aarhus Jazz Festival 2018

Elisabeth Westenholz is a Danish pianist and organist. She has been called one of Denmark’s premier performers by the Kristeligt Dagblad.

== Biography ==
Westenholz was born in 1942 in Copenhagen. Both her parents played the piano, and her father taught her pieces by Mozart and Bach when she was very young. She began studying piano at the Royal Danish Academy of Music with Harriet Østergaard-Andersen and then subsequently with Ester Vagning. She also lived in Wales for a few months in 1959, where she took a break from school and studied with Patrick Piggott. In Wales, she made her television debut on a local TV station. After her schooling was complete, she studied at Oxford, under 90-year-old Leonie Gombrich, who knew such greats as Brahms, Mahler, and Bruckner. She had additional studies with Bruno Seidlhofer in Vienna.

Westenholz also studied the organ with Carl Johann Grum. She was thus able to serve as second organist at the Garrison Church in Copenhagen from 1968 to 1967, and as organist at the Church of Holmen for 19 years, where she occasionally played for the royal family.

After making her debut in 1968, Westenholz has played in numerous venues around the world, including the Ludwigsburg Festival, the Concertgebouw's chamber series, and the Perth International Arts Festival. She has collaborated with the Trio pro Arte, violinist Gaston Poulet, flautist Toke Lund Christiansen, violinist Nikolay Madoyan, and cellist Kim Bak Dinitzen. Her discography includes works by Mozart, Beethoven, Schubert, Niels Gade, Carl Nielsen, Friedrich Kuhlau, and Tchaikovsky. Performances and recordings of Beethoven include the complete works for cello and piano, with cellist Ralph Kirshbaum, his Diabelli Variations, and the complete piano concerti. She is a 2011 recipient of the Order of the Dannebrog, and in 1984 was appointed as an honorary member of the Chamber Music Association.

She was married to Preben Steen Petersen until his death in 2012, from cancer. She has two children.
