= Caprice No. 13 (Paganini) =

Caprice No. 13, nicknamed Devil's Laughter or Devil's Chuckle, is one of Niccolò Paganini's renowned 24 Caprices for Solo Violin. It is the only one of the suite that is in the key of B-flat major.

This solo violin piece starts out with scale-like double-stopped passages at a moderate speed. The second part consists of high speed runs that exercise left hand flexibility and position shifting, and right hand high speed string changing and détaché bowing. The piece then repeats back to the beginning and ends right before reaching the second part for the second time.
