= Theodore Hauman =

Belgian violinist and music teacher (1808–1878)

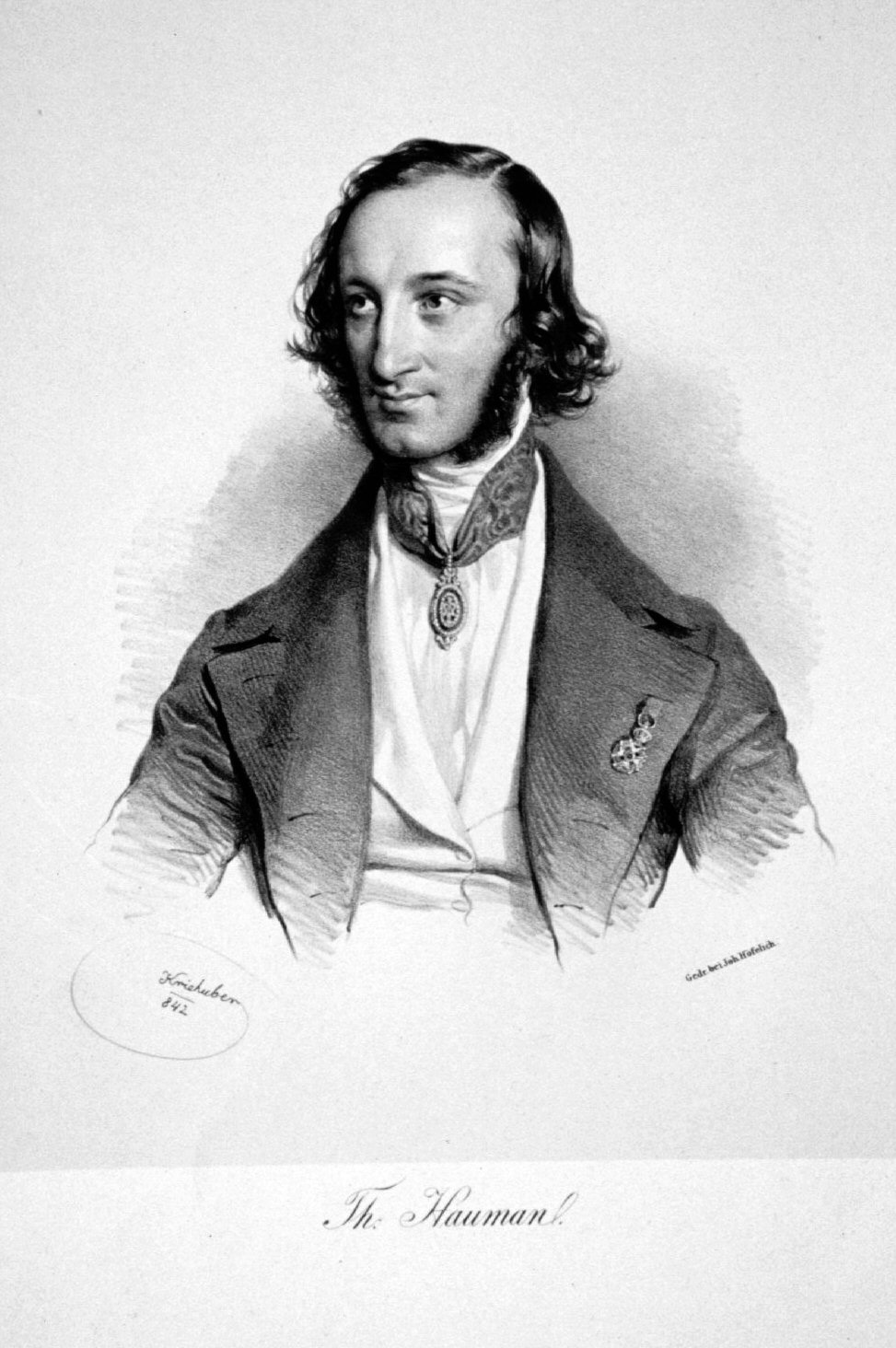
- 1842 lithography of Hauman by Josef Kriehuber
- Born: 3 July 1808; Ghent, Escaut, First French Empire
- Died: 21 August 1878 (aged 70)
- Other name: Theodor Haumann
- Education: State University of Leuven
- Occupations: Violinist; music teacher
- Organization: Royal Swedish Academy of Music
- Style: Classical

Theodore Hauman (3 July 1808, Ghent – 21 August 1878, Brussels), also written Theodor Haumann, was a Belgian violinist and music teacher.

== Biography ==
Theodore Hauman was born in Ghent to a Jewish family. He studied the violin with Joseph François Snel of the Grand théâtre of Brussels. During his training, he alternated, for several periods, between the violin and university studies. At the behest of his parents, he studied at the University of Leuven, left it after two years to devote himself to the violin, but ultimately graduated in Law in 1830.

Since 1827, he was successful soloist in performances in Paris and devoted himself entirely to music, practicing violin for up to ten hours a day. He made a new appearance in Paris in 1832 with great success. The following year, Hauman met Niccolò Paganini, who took a friendly interest in him so much that he became his protégé. Hauman took part in Hector Berlioz's memorable concert on 22 December 1833. It was on that occasion that Paganini, who had come mainly to encourage his "protégé", heard Berloiz's Symphonie fantastique, Op. 14, directed by Narcisse Girard, and at the end of the concert, knelt in front of Berlioz as a sign of admiration. After the successes in Paris, Hauman performed as a violinist in numerous concerts in France and conducted numerous tours in Europe in the following years. In 1842, he was elected as a member of the Royal Academy of Music in Stockholm. Hauman is mentioned several times in the diaries of Robert and Clara Schumann. In Paris, between January and February 1843, Camillo Sivori, Paganini's famous pupil, and Hauman challenged each other in a public performance, a sort of "skill contest", of Paganini's "Carnival of Venice". According to Berlioz, in 1844, Hauman after a triumphal tour in Russia decided to open a music school in Paris to devote himself to teaching.

== Critical reception ==
The testimonies of contemporaries on Hauman's playing do not seem to have always been favorable. Despite an excellent technique, it seems that he had a strong inclination to mannerism – "Fantasias with Airs with variations". The German poet Heinrich Heine was particularly lashing in his critique of Hauman, classifying him as the prototype of the "virtuoso of the void". For Heine, Hauman tended to move away from the composer's language by adding "embellishments" and other bright flourishes that were irrelevant to the original text.

== Compositions ==
- Albert Sowiński and Theodore Hauman, Duo brillant sur la prière d'Otello, Op. 13, for violin and piano. Paris, Launer, c. 1829. Dedicated to Madame Malibran.

== Bibliography ==
- Fétis, François-Joseph (1862). "Voice Hauman (Théodore)". Biographie universelle des musiciens (in French). Vol. 4 (2nd ed.). Paris: Firmin Didot. pp. 244–245. OCLC 5845494 – via Internet Archive.
- Lecat de Bazancourt, César (12 October 1878). "Theodore Haumann the Belgian Violinist". The Musical Standard. Fasc. 741. 15. Translated by J. A. Munkelt: 231.
