= Aurel Plasari =

Albanian lecturer, scholar, writer, translator and professor

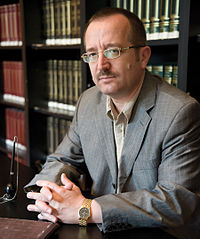
- Born: 16 September 1956 (age 70); Tirana, PR Albania
- Occupations: writer, translator

Aurel Plasari (born 16 September 1956) is an Albanian lecturer, scholar, writer, translator and professor.

== Early life and education ==
Plasari was born in Tirana, where he completed all levels of his education. At the age of seventeen, while still in high school, Plasari began to publish translations from world literature ("Nëntori" magazine, Year 1973, No. 3).

== Career ==
After graduating from secondary school, he fulfilled compulsory military service and, as for several years his right to pursue higher education was denied for "biographical" reasons, he started work at the most basic level of the press, as a copy-editor in the typography for "Mihal Duri".

From 1982 he worked as literary editor at the magazine "Nëntori", an organ of the Writers and Artists' Union of Albania. After graduation in 1989 he worked as an editor of translated literature, and later in 1990 as secretary of the editorial board, at the same magazine.

Beginning in 1990 he became a part-time lecturer at the University of Tirana's Faculty of History and Philology. In 1991 he completed a postgraduate specialization at "Alcalá" University in Madrid, Spain, and in 1992 he became a full-time lecturer at the Faculty of History and Philology (UT), where he also held the position of vice dean. In 1994 he obtained a doctoral degree in Comparative Literature.

Plasari was a lecturer and doctoral fellow for university subjects such as "History of Aesthetics" and "Principles of Aesthetics", as well as for special courses "Introduction to Narratology", "Theory of Reception", etc. In 1995 he became an "Associate Professor", and from 1995 to 1996 was a guest lecturer at Inalco (Institut des Langues et Civilisations Orientales), Paris. Returning to Albania, he continued to work at the Faculty of History and Philology (UT) until 1998, when he became director of the National Library of Albania, a post he still held in 2014. Since 2010 he has held the title of "Professor". In the Master's Course of Library Science's Second Level, organized in the Albanian education system, he has developed the subject "Introduction to Albanology". From 2014 to 2023, he served at the Academy of Albanian Studies as director of the Albanian Encyclopedia Center. Since 2024, he is a freelancer.

From 1990 until 2014 he engaged in national and international scientific-academic activities, lecturing and attending conferences in various countries.

Plasari headed the new edition of the cultural magazine "Hylli i Dritës" in 1993–1997 (from the reopening until it was closed again), and wrote in the free Albanian press, including the newspaper "Rilindja Demokratike" from its first issue, writing in various fields of culture, but also on policy. Beginning in 1990, some editions of Fishta, Merxhani, Harapi, and Beduli have been prepared by him; he also directed the series "Intelligenda" (Publishing House "55"), with various Albano-Balkanological's contributors, including Jorga, Jirecek, Gelcich, Suliotti, Londres, Konica, Nadin, and Xhufi.

In 2012 he was member of Interministerial Committee of Celebration of Proclamation of Independence's 100th Anniversary.

== Books and works ==
=== In Albanian ===
- Don Kishoti zbret në Shqipëri, Tiranë 1990
- Vija e Teodosit rishfaqet, Tiranë 1993; T. 1995
- Letërsia dhe muret, Tiranë 1993
- Anton Harapi Redimensus, Tiranë 1994
- Kuteli midis të gjallëve e të vdekurve, Tiranë 1995
- Fishta i dashuruari, Tiranë 1996
- Plani i fshehtë për një Internacionale të re, Tiranë 1996
- Përballë një kulture të vdekjes, Tiranë 1997
- Biopolitika: a ekziston në Shqipëri? Tiranë 1999
- Fenomeni Voskopojë, Tiranë 2000
- Dhjetë ditë që nuk tronditën botën (arlekinadë), Tiranë 2001
- Lufta e Trojës vazhdon, Tiranë 2002
- Rrëmbimi i Europës, Tiranë 2005
- Alfabete në Bibliotekë, Tiranë 2008
- Skënderbeu: një histori politike, Tiranë 2010
- Arbni historik, gjeografik, kishtar dhe politik, Tiranë 2020, Tiranë 2021;
- Barleti i hershëm sipas një dorëshkrimi të panjohur (with Lucia Nacin), Tiranë 2022 (Akademia e Studimeve Albanologjike).

=== Published abroad ===
- Saint Jerôme – fils d'Illyrie, Tirana 1990
- La linea di Teodosio torna a dividere, Bari 1998; Bari 2000
- The Line of Theodosius reappears, New York 2001
- Il ratto dell'Europa, Bari 2009
- La guerra di Scutari da un manoscritto sconosciuto di Marino Barlezio (with Lucia Nadin), Viella Ed., Roma 2024.

=== Translations from world literature ===
- L. Hughes, Lumi i vrerit, T. 1976
- J. L. Caragiale, Një letër e humbur, T. 1977
- H. Smirnenski, Të bëhet dritë, T. 1977
- Këngë të popujve, T. 1978 (co-translator)
- A. Jozsef, Shoku pyll, buçit, T. 1979
- Muzat në vitin e luftës, T. 1980 (co-translator)
- Poetë francezë, T. 1980 (bashkëpërkthyes)
- A. Mizkiewicz, Vjersha dhe poema, T. 1980 (co-translator)
- F. García Lorca, Jerma, T. 1982
- F. García Lorca, Dasmë gjaku, T. 1985
- Tregime e novela të shek. XX, T. 1983 (co-translator)
- Antologji e poezisë së re greke, T. 1986 (co-translator)
- G. García Márquez, Gjethurinat, T. 1986, Prishtinë 1988
- G. García Márquez, Kolonelit s'ka kush t'i shkruajë, T. 1986, Prishtinë 1988
- G. García Márquez, Një histori me paskuinë, T. 1986, Prishtinë 1988
- G. García Márquez, Kronikë e një vdekjeje të paralajmëruar, T. 1986, Prishtinë 1988; T.1999
- Esé dhe shkrime të tjera kritike, T. 1988 (co-translator)
- J. Cortázar, Autostrada e Jugut, T. 1988, Prishtinë1989
- F. Dostoiewski, Net të bardha, T. 1990, T. 1995; T. 1999
- Poetë spanjollë të shekullit XX, T. 1991
- M. Sorescu, Një flatër dhe një këmbë, T. 1993
- J. Cortázar, Armët e fshehta, T. 1999
- O. Fallaci, Mllefi dhe krenaria, T. 2001
- A. Ahmatova, Përzitje, T. 2003
- A. Ahmatova, Poezi, T. 2009
- I. Montanelli, Shqipëria një dhe njëmijë, T. 2003; T. 2005
- C. Malaparte, Teknika e grushtit të shtetit, T. 2006
- A. Ahmatova: Ballo me maska në park, T. 2019
- J. Cortázar: Qielli i rremë, Tregime, T. 2021.

== Awards, orders and honors ==
- 2025 Supreme Order of the Eagle
- 2021 Order "Gjergj Kastrioti Skënderbeu". The President of the Republic of Albania
- 2018 International Scientific Award for the most successful studies on Gjergj Kastrioti - Skënderbeu in the Nationwide Year dedicated to his figure and era. Academy of Sciences of Albania.
- 2016 "KULT" Award, for the study book "Albania and the Albanians in the 'Europe' of Pius II. "Kult" Academy.
- 2014 Order "Honor of the Nation". The President of the Republic of Albania
- 2012, Gratitude of Albanian Parliament In 100th Anniversary of the Declaration of Independence of Albania
- 2009, Certificate of Gratitude, National and University Library of Kosovo
- 2008, "Order of Merit of the Italian Republic", President of Italian Republic
- 2005, Award "Best Practice", first edition, For National Library's Leadership, Junior Chamber Italiana / Junior Chamber International
- 2003, Award "Serembe", For the book "Lufta e Trojës vazhdon", "Serembe" Foundation
- 2000, Award "Penda e Argjendtë", For the book's translation "Armët e fshehta", Julio Cortazar, Ministry of Culture
- 1993, Award "The best literary translation", For the book "Një flatër dhe një këmbë", Marin Sorescu, Ministry of Culture
- 1989, Order "Naim Frashëri", "For special contribution as well as high artistic level in the field of literary translations", Presidum of the People's Assembly of Albania
