= Order of the Academic Oak =

Honorary decoration of the Republic of Albania

Order of the Academic Oak Urdhri i Lisit Akademik
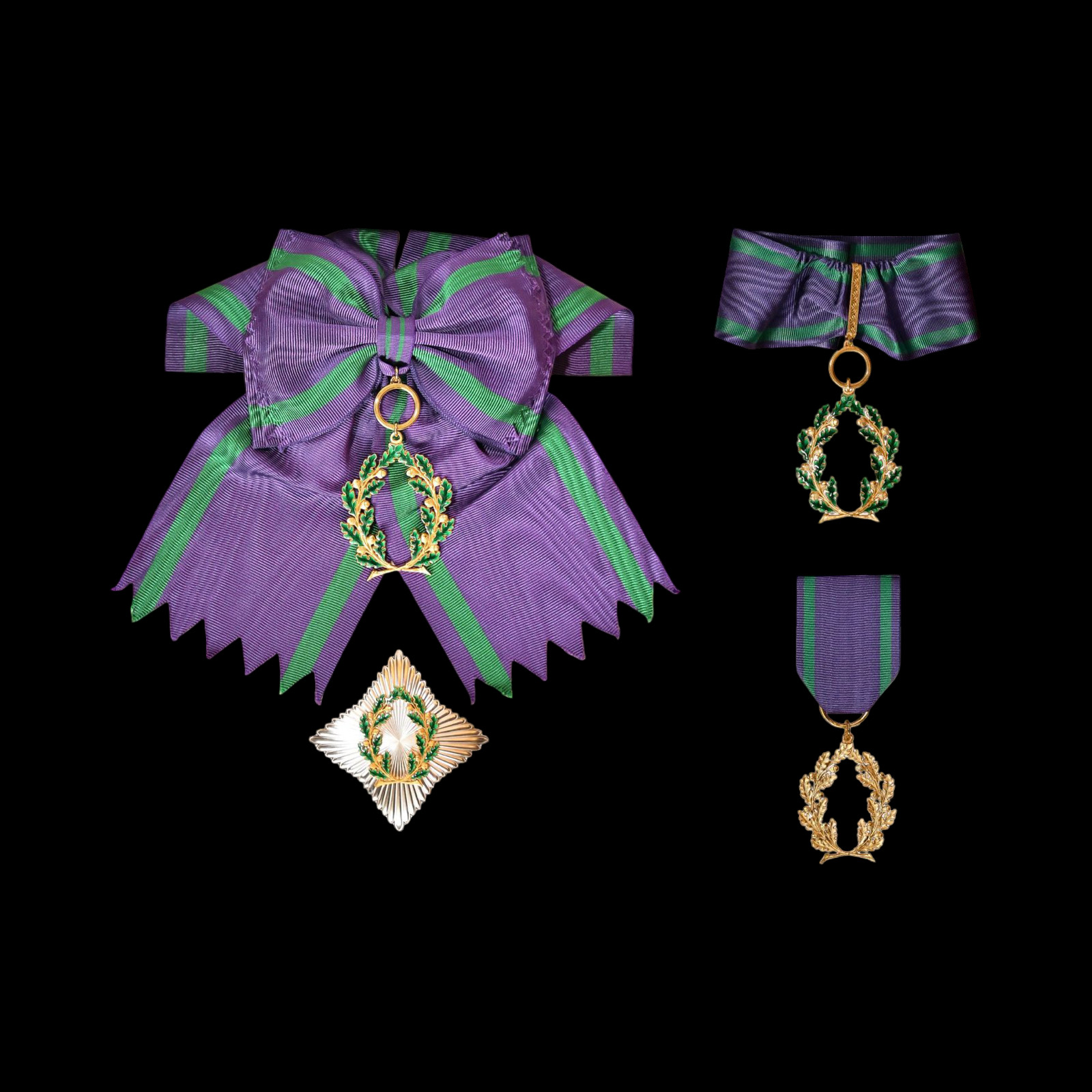
- The order shown in three classes

Awarded by the President of the Republic
- Type: Order of merit
- Established: 28 March 2024
- Country: Albania
- Eligibility: Albanian citizens
- Status: Currently constituted
- Grades: Grand Star; Commander; Knight
- Ribbon bar

The Order of the Academic Oak (Albanian: Urdhri i Lisit Akademik; ULA) is an Albanian order of merit awarded for notable contributions to the arts, culture, education, science, literature, sports, journalism and other fields of intellectual and creative activity.

== History ==
The Order of the Academic Oak was established as part of a reform on Albania's system of state honors, creating a national decoration for distinguished achievement in cultural, academic, scientific and creative fields. From 2013 to 2025, the legislation in force provided no separate decoration for such achievements, which were instead recognised through honorary titles.

The new order has no direct equivalent among earlier Albanian decorations. Its concept draws partly on the French Ordre des Palmes académiques and Ordre des Arts et des Lettres, both of which have influenced the development of similar honors in other countries.

== Insignia ==
Several features distinguish the Albanian order from the French models. Its insignia consists of two oak branches in place of palm branches and the violet ribbon bears two longitudinal green stripes. The order also includes the Grand Star as its highest grade, while omitting the grade of Officer. Additionally, the Order of the Academic Oak is a national order, whereas its French counterparts are ministerial orders.

== Grades ==
The Order of the Academic Oak is conferred in three grades, ranked by descending order of precedence:

Insignia	Description
	Grand Star; The insignia of the Grand Star consists of a 74 mm four-pointed silver star surmounted by a green-enamelled oak-leaf wreath measuring 35 × 45 mm. Both elements are made of 960/999 silver, with the wreath gilded in 750/999 gold. A second oak-leaf wreath, measuring 50 × 60 mm and similarly gilded and enamelled, serves as the sash badge and is attached by a 12 mm ring.
	Commander; The insignia of the Commander consists of an oak-leaf wreath identical to that used for the sash badge of the Grand Star. Measuring 50 × 60 mm, it is suspended from a 50 mm-wide neck ribbon.
	Knight; The insignia of the Knight consists of a single-sided oak-leaf wreath measuring 35 × 45 mm. It is made of 960/999 silver, gilded with 750/999 gold and is not enamelled. It is then suspended from a 37 mm-wide ribbon and is worn on the left side of the chest.

== Notable recipients ==
=== Grand Star ===
- Ismet Elezi – jurist and legal scholar (2025)
- Abaz Hoxha – film historian and scholar (2025)

=== Commander ===
- Shpresa Gjongecaj – archaeologist (2025)
- Zyber Dushku – military officer (2025)
- Etleva Domi – academic and librarian (2025)
- Fioralba Cakoni – mathematician (2025)
- Hasan Uğur Ulusoy – businessman and philanthropist (2026)

=== Knight ===
- Gjovalin Bicaj – teacher (2025)
- Edor Kabashi – scientist and academic (2025)
- Kastriot Aliko – teacher (2025)
- Liljana Luani – teacher (2025)
- Klarita Gërxhani – sociologist and academic (2026)
- Shqiponja Telhaj – economist and academic (2026)

== See also ==
- Chancellery of Orders and Medals of the Republic
- Orders, decorations, and medals of Albania
