= Order of Skanderbeg (1945–1996) =

Honorary decoration of the Republic of Albania

Order of Skanderbeg Urdhri i Skënderbeut

Awarded by The Presidium of the People's Assembly
- Type: Order of merit
- Established: 13 October 1945
- Country: People's Socialist Republic of Albania
- Eligibility: Military and security personnel
- Criteria: Distinguished military service, leadership and contribution to the development of the armed forces.
- Status: Discontinued
- Classes: I, II, III
- 1st Class 2nd Class 3rd Class

The Order of Skanderbeg (Albanian: Urdhri i Skënderbeut) was a military decoration of the People's Socialist Republic of Albania, established on 13 October 1945 and named after the Albanian national hero Skanderbeg.

Divided into three classes, it was awarded primarily to military and internal security officers for distinguished service, combat leadership and contributions to the organization, training and development of the country's armed forces.

== History ==
Although an earlier Albanian order bearing the same name existed prior to 1945, the communist-era model was introduced as a separate order with a new design and award criteria.

Instituted on 13 October 1945, in three classes, the order was named after Skanderbeg, the 15th-century local ruler and military commander who led resistance against the Ottoman Empire. Its earliest insignia were manufactured in Yugoslavia by the Zagreb-based IKOM ("Industrijska kovnica Orešković Marko") between 1945 and 1948.

Following the deterioration of Albanian–Yugoslav relations in 1948, production was transferred at the Präwema factory in Markneukirchen, East Germany. Differences in materials, manufacturing techniques, reverse construction and fastening systems resulted in numerous variants of the decoration.

== Award criteria ==
The Order of Skanderbeg was awarded to active-duty and reserve officers of the Albanian People's Army, personnel of the Ministry of Internal Affairs and members of the Volunteer Forces of People's Self-Defence, as well as military units and subunits. It recognized distinguished combat leadership, military and political merit and contributions to the organization, training, modernization and strengthening of the armed forces.

From the 1970s, the order was additionally awarded for long and exemplary military service. First Class was awarded to generals and officers after 25 years of service, Second Class after 20 years and Third Class after 15 years.

== Grades ==
The Order of Skanderbeg was conferred in three classes:

- First Class (Albanian: Klasi i Parë)
- Second Class (Albanian: Klasi i Dytë)
- Third Class (Albanian: Klasi i Tretë)

== Insignia ==
The insignia comprised two superimposed five-pointed stars, approximately 48 mm across, with a laurel wreath and central medallion depicting Skanderbeg in profile wearing his distinctive helmet.

Insignia	Description
	First Class; The First Class insignia consisted of two superimposed gilt five-pointed stars, surmounted by a laurel wreath and a smaller red-enameled star. At the center was a silvered and patinated medallion depicting Skanderbeg in profile wearing his helmet. Some examples manufactured by IKOM were made of gilt silver and bore Yugoslav silver hallmarks, while a special series was produced in gold.
	Second Class; The Second Class insignia followed the same design and dimensions as the First Class but was predominantly silvered, with a gilt wreath and red-enameled star. Early examples were made of silver with gilt elements while later versions were produced from silvered base metal.
	Third Class; The Third Class insignia retained the same design and dimensions as the higher classes but was mostly silvered, with a central medallion depicting Skanderbeg in profile.

== Notable recipients ==
- Mehmet Shehu
- Kristo Themelko
- Beqir Balluku
- Rrahman Parllaku
- Pëllumb Deshnica
- Hito Çako
- Gjeli Argjiri
- Gafur Çuçi
- Myzafer Spaho
- Qazim Kondi
- Xhule Çiraku
- Kadri Hazbiu
- Thoma Xhixho
- Ndreko Rino
- Qazim Kapisyzi
- Vehbi Abazi
- Kadri Brahimaj
- Halim Ramohito
- Hajdar Aranitasi
- Skënder Çuçi
- Muharrem Kokomani
- Vasil Miçi
- Nuçi Panga
- Ndreçi Plasari

== See also ==
- Orders, decorations, and medals of Albania
- Order of Skanderbeg (1925–1945)
- Order of Skanderbeg (2022)
