= Order of Skanderbeg (2022) =

Honorary decoration of the Republic of Albania

Order of Skanderbeg Ylli i Skënderbeut
- Grand Star of the Order

Awarded by the President of Albania
- Type: Order of merit
- Established: 28 March 2024
- Country: Albania
- Eligibility: Albanians, foreign citizens.
- Awarded for: Distinguished and sustained civil or military service to the Albanian state and nation and for contributions to society and democratic values.
- Status: Currently constituted
- Head of the Order: President of the Republic
- Grades: Grand Star; Grand Officer; Commander; Officer; Knight
- Ribbon bar

The Order of Skanderbeg (Albanian: Urdhri i Skënderbeut; USK) is an Albanian order of merit awarded for distinguished and sustained civil or military service to the Albanian state and nation and for contributions to society and democratic values.

It is the oldest of the country's current national orders and ranks second in the ceremonial order of precedence.

== History ==
The present-day Order of Skanderbeg is not a direct institutional successor to the decoration established under then-president Ahmet Zogu in 1925, which survives as part of the dynastic heritage of the former Albanian royal family.

Within the hierarchy of civil honors of that period, the order ranked immediately below the Order of Besa.

The current order is likewise distinct from the Order of Skanderbeg used during communist rule, which was an exclusively military decoration.

Nevertheless, the modern order retains the name of Skanderbeg, Albania's national hero and follows the five-grade structure of its predecessor.

The ribbon and insignia incorporate design elements of the original order through its predominantly reddish field, complimented by red and black stripes, in addition to the diamond-cut relief with a five-pointed star.

The five-pointed star draws on the motif used for the "Gjergj Kastrioti Skënderbeu" Decoration and ultimately derives from the Officer insignia of the inaugural order. In the modern design, the trophy of arms previously occupying the center of the star is replaced by a portrait of Skanderbeg in civilian clothing, emphasizing his role as a statesman.

== Grades ==
The Order of Skanderbeg consists of five grades, arranged in descending order of precedence:

- Grand Star (Albanian: Ylli i Madh)
- Grand Officer (Albanian: Oficer i Madh)
- Commander (Albanian: Komandar)
- Officer (Albanian: Oficer)
- Knight (Albanian: Kalorës)

== Insignia ==
The insignia of the Order of Skanderbeg is based on a five-pointed star bearing a central portrait of Skanderbeg, derived from a depiction attributed to Cristofano dell'Altissimo and preserved in the Uffizi gallery, in Florence. Other recurring elements include an oak-leaf wreath, the red and black national colors and a stylized representation of Skanderbeg's helmet.

Insignia	Description
	Grand Star; The Grand Star insignia consists of a breast star and sash badge. The breast star comprises a 74 mm diamond-cut five-pointed star surmounted by a 64 mm white-enameled five-pointed star, with a central bas-relief portrait of Skanderbeg bordered in red and black enamel. A green-enameled oak wreath surrounds the center, while a stylized representation of Skanderbeg’s helmet appears above. The insignia is made of 960/999 silver, with the upper star, wreath, helmet and central shield gilded in 750/999 gold. The 58 mm sash badge follows the same design but omits the diamond-cut base. Made of gilded 960/999 silver, it is suspended from the grand cordon by a 12 mm ring above the helmet.
	Grand Officer; The Grand Officer insignia consists of a 64 mm breast star and a 58 mm neck badge. The breast star follows the design of the Grand Star but omits the diamond-cut base and is made of 960/999 silver gilded with 750/999 gold. The neck badge is identical to the Grand Star sash badge and is suspended from a 50 mm-wide ribbon.
	Commander; The Commander insignia is identical to the 58 mm neck badge used for the Grand Officer and as the Grand Star sash badge but is worn without an accompanying breast star.
	Officer; The Officer insignia consists of a 40 mm white-enameled five-pointed star made of 960/999 silver and gilded with 750/999 gold. At its center is a portrait of Skanderbeg surrounded by a gilded oak-leaf wreath. The badge is suspended from a 37 mm-wide ribbon by a connector depicting Skanderbeg’s helmet facing heraldic left and is worn on the left side of the chest.
	Knight; The Knight insignia consists of a 40 mm white-enameled five-pointed star made of 960/999 silver, with a central portrait of Skanderbeg surrounded by an ungilded and unenameled oak-leaf wreath. Unlike the Officer badge, it lacks the helmet-shaped connector and is suspended directly from a 37 mm-wide ribbon by a 10 mm ring. It is worn on the left side of the chest.

== Notable recipients ==
=== Grand Star ===
- Besim Elezi – physician and professor of medicine (2025)
- Seit Mansaku – linguist and academic (2025)

=== Grand Officer ===
- Pëllumb Xhufi – historian and diplomat (2025)
- Francesco Altimari – linguist and Albanologist (2025)
- Matteo Mandalà – Albanologist and professor (2025)

=== Commander ===
- Shpresa Gjongecaj – ethnomusicologist and academic (2025)
- Zyber Dushku – military officer (2025)

=== Officer ===
- Mimoza Dhëmbi – choreographer and ballet dancer (2025)
- Markus Schuhmann – physician and neurosurgeon (2026)

=== Knight ===
- Ajet Jata – military officer (2025)
- Adriana Hysenaj – educator (2025)
- Lorik Cana – former professional footballer (2026)
- Anders Lindberg – diplomat (2026)

== See also ==
- Chancellery of Orders and Medals of the Republic
- Orders, decorations, and medals of Albania
- Order of Skanderbeg (1925–1945)
- Order of Skanderbeg (1945–1996)
