= Variations on "Non più mesta" (Paganini) =

Introduction and Variations on "Non più mesta accanto al foco"
- by Niccolò Paganini
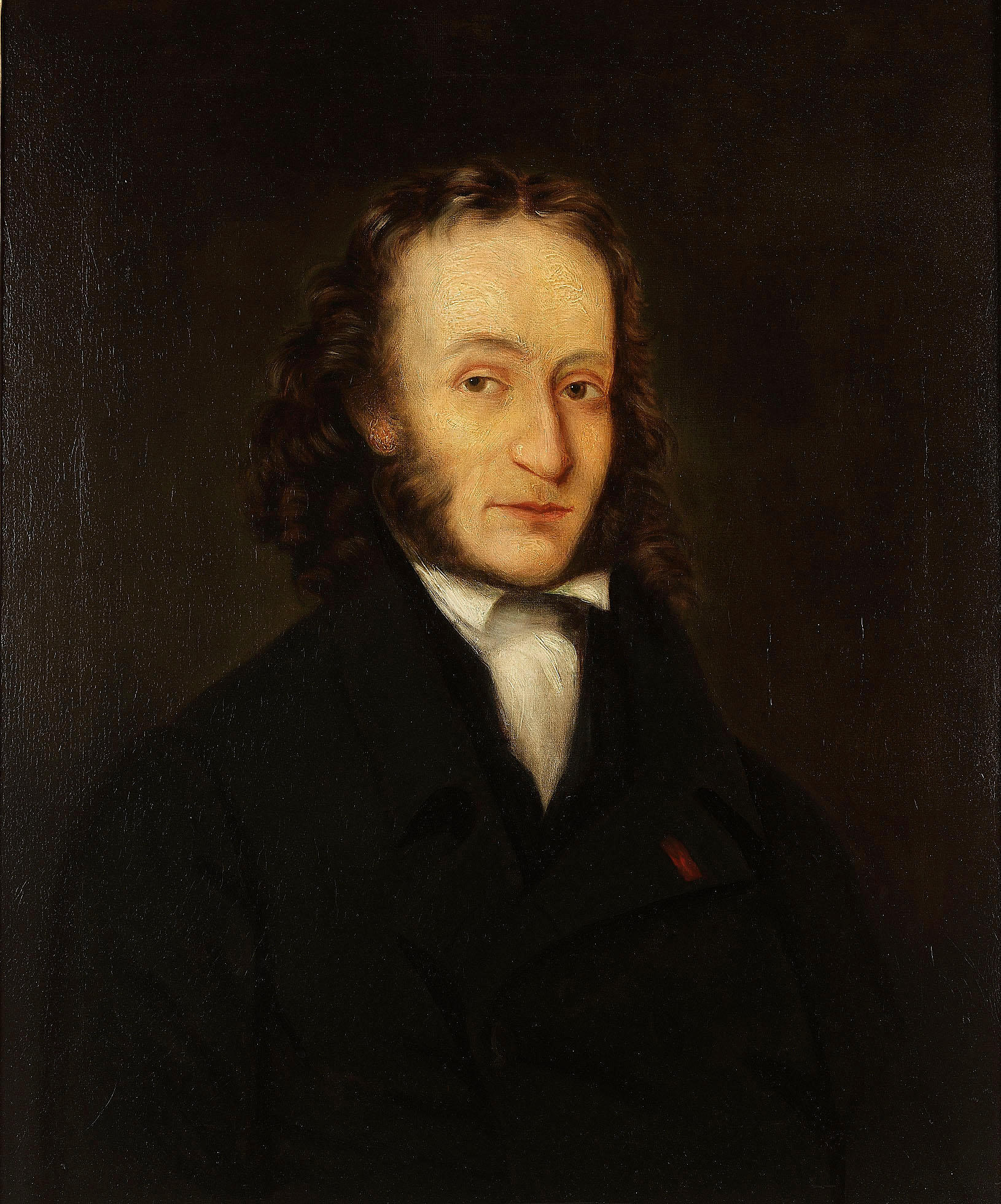
- The composer
- Key: E♭ major
- Catalogue: MS 22
- Opus: Op. 12
- Year: 1819
- Related: Gioachino Rossini's La cenerentola (1817)
- Duration: 12 minutes
- Scoring: Violin and orchestra

Introduction and Variations on "Non più mesta accanto al foco", (Note: The work does not have a single standardized title. Instead, publishers and recordings use slightly different versions of a longer descriptive title, usually referring to it as an Introduction [or Theme] and Variations on the Rondo "Non più mesta accanto al f[u]oco", from "La cenerentola" by Gioacchino Rossini.) (Note: “Foco” is an archaic poetic variant of the modern Italian “fuoco” (fire), used in early 19th-century operatic language.) Op. 12, MS 22 (Italian: Introduzione e variazioni su "Non più mesta accanto al foco"), is a composition by Italian violin virtuoso and composer Niccolò Paganini, based on a theme from Gioachino Rossini's La Cenerentola. It was finished and first performed in 1819, shortly after the opera premiere, which took place two years earlier.

== Background ==
“Non più mesta” was presumably composed between 1817, immediately after the premiere of Rossini's La Cenerentola, and 1819, but Paganini never published it during his lifetime, instead keeping it in his personal collection, which he also used for public performance, as he was a violin virtuoso more than a publishing composer. Despite several attempts to have it published later in his life, he died in 1840 without seeing it in print. It was only after his death, when publishers and collectors began to access his manuscripts, that the publishing firms of Schonenberger, in Paris, and B. Schotts Söhne, in Mainz, brought out the piece along with eight more unreleased works. Some other publishers also published them in their respective local markets, such as Ricordi, who published it in 1851 in Milan. As was customary for many of Paganini’s posthumous works, it was issued as a reduction for violin and piano. Upon publication, it was assigned Op. 12 and labeled “N.º 7 delle opere postume” (No. 7 of the posthumous works). This is because Paganini only published the first five opus numbers in his lifetime, and all subsequent opus numbers were assigned posthumously by publishers, not musicologists.

Violinist Fritz Kreisler made an arrangement for violin and piano in 1905, in which he removed the third variation and made substantial changes to much of the piece. This arrangement was first published in 1905 by Eulenburg in Leipzig (for Europe) and by G. Schirmer in New York (for America). An additional arrangement for cello and piano was made by Robert Emil Bockmühl. Published by Litolff in Braunschweig, it was described as a "concert-etude" and was dedicated to the professor at the Leipzig Conservatory Carl Schröder.

== Structure ==
The composition is concertante in style, scored for a solo violin and an orchestra consisting of two flutes, two oboes, two clarinets, two bassoons, two French horns, two trumpets, two trombones, a bass trombone, timpani, a bass drum, and a string section that is made up of seven first violins, six second violins, four violas, three cellos, and eight double basses. It has a total duration of around twelve minutes. The piece is divided into different sections which are structured as follows:

- Introduction. Adagio cantabile
- Theme. Moderato
- Variation I
- Variation II
- Variation III
- Variation IV
- Finale. Allegro - Più presto

"Non più mesta" is in the key of E♭ major. It is based on an original theme by Gioachino Rossini, found in the finale of Act II of La Cenerentola (1817). To make the solo violin part easier, Niccolò Paganini used scordatura, retuning the solo violin strings a semitone higher (to A♭, E♭, B♭, and F). In this setup, the violinist reads the music as if it were in D major, while it sounds in E♭ major. In some modern editions and performances, the piece is instead transposed and played directly in D major in standard tuning, in order to avoid scordatura.

== Recordings ==
The following is a list of recordings of Paganini's "Non più mesta":

Recordings of Introduction and Variations on "Non più mesta accanto al foco", Op. 12, MS 22, by NIccolò Paganini
| Violin | Conductor (or piano) | Orchestra | Date of recording | Place of recording | Record label | Notes |
|---|---|---|---|---|---|---|
| Salvatore Accardo | Charles Dutoit | London Symphony Orchestra | April 1975 | Barking Town Hall, London, UK | Deutsche Grammophon | |
| Stefan Milenkovich | Massimo Paderni | — | June 1996 | Dynamic's, Genoa, Italy | Dynamic | |
| Philippe Quint | Dmitri Kogan | — | June 2008 | Glenn Gould Studio, CBC, Toronto, Ontario, Canada | Naxos | |
| Benjamin Schmid | Ariane Haering | — | January 2013 | Solitär des Mozarteums, Salzburg, Austria | Oehms Classics | |
| Mario Hossen | Martin Kerschbaum | Vienna Classical Players | March 2017 | Casino Baumgarten, Vienna, Austria | Dynamic | |

== Reception ==
Very few details about this piece have survived. However, a reviewer of a concert in May 1824 that featured the work remarked that it was the best received item in a program of twelve pieces, and that it roused "furore upon furore."
