= Cowbell Digital Music =

Australian independent record label

Cowbell Digital Music Logo.

Cowbell Digital Music (also referred to as Cowbell or Cowbell Music) is an independent record label based in Queensland, Australia. The name derives from a Saturday Night Live sketch in which Christopher Walken demands 'More Cowbell.

Cowbell Digital Music, in addition to being an independent label, has several sub-divisions.

Launching Cowbell China in early 2010, Cowbell became "the first [independent label] in the western world to successfully launch into the heavily regulated Chinese digital music distribution market."

Cowbell Entertainment has licensed the Grammy Award winning show, The Purple Couch.

The company's current slogan is 'It's Your Choice'.

== History ==
Early in 2009, Shayne Locke, as CEO, and Andrew Browne, the Chief Operations Officer founded the company.

Cowbell China "was launched in February and is based on the same model operating Cowbell’s worldwide distribution since October 2009."

Cowbell China also offers direct links to their music store through a partnership with a major Chinese website that receives up to 4 million hits per month.

== Partnerships ==
Cowbell's roster includes Guy 'Mutto' Mutton from the 2006 series of "Australian Idol and Brisbane based Nik Phillips who broke through the Chinese charts in 2010. Nik Phillips' song, 'Reach Around The World', a duet with Chinese singer Bi Jie reached number 4 on the Chinese charts."

Creating a partnership with China's prevalent record label, TR Music, Cowbell China is also able to offer physical distribution and touring options for the artists who gain popularity within China.
