= Miriam Solovieff =

American violinist and pianist (1921–2004)

- Born: November 4, 1921; San Francisco, California, U.S.
- Died: October 3, 2004 (aged 82); Paris, France
- Occupation(s): Violinist, pianist, music teacher

Miriam Solovieff (also: Myriam Solovieff, November 4, 1921 – October 3, 2004) was an American classical violinist, pianist, and music teacher.

== Biography ==
Solovieff was born in San Francisco. The daughter of an Orthodox Jewish emigrant from Russia, she received piano lessons from the age of three. From 1928, she also received violin lessons from Robert Pollack at the San Francisco Conservatory of Music. After Pollack left for Japan, she was first taught by Kathleen Parlow's assistant Carol Weston and then by Kathleen Parlow herself.

After appearances at the Pacific Musical Society and the Community Playhouse, among others, she made her debut in 1932 in the Young People's Symphony Concerts with the San Francisco Symphony Orchestra under the direction of Basil Cameron. She subsequently appeared with the Los Angeles Philharmonic under the direction of Artur Rodziński.

From 1933 to 1937 she studied with Louis Persinger, the teacher of Yehudi Menuhin and Ruggiero Ricci. In 1934 she performed Felix Mendelssohn's Violin Concerto in front of an audience of one thousand at the Hollywood Bowl with the Los Angeles Philharmonic Orchestra under Ossip Gabrilowitsch, and in 1937 she made her debut in New York's Town Hall. In 1938, she traveled to Europe to study with Carl Flesch and gave concerts in Belgium, the Netherlands and England.

In 1939, Solovieff was an eyewitness when her estranged father fatally shot her mother, her sister and finally himself; she herself escaped unharmed.

During the Second World War, she worked as a violinist for the US Army's troop support unit and also gave concerts in the liberated concentration camps of Buchenwald and Auschwitz.

In 1946, she gave a concert with the Vienna Symphony Orchestra under the direction of Jonathan Sternberg. In the 1950s, Solovieff settled in Paris and taught violin. In the mid-1960s, she recorded all of Johannes Brahms' violin sonatas with Julius Katchen, but the recordings were never released commercially. She lived in Paris from 1949 until her death in a hospital on October 3, 2004.
