= Order of the Black Eagle (Albania) =

Order of the Black Eagle Urdhri i Shqiponjës së Zezë
- Order of the Black Eagle (silver star)

Awarded by the Principality of Albania
- Type: Silver medallion, partly gilded and enameled
- Established: 26 March 1914
- Country: Principality of Albania
- Motto: Besë e Bashkim (English: Fidelity and Union)
- Criteria: Deserving military and civil deeds
- Classes: Grand Cross; Grand Officer; Commander; Officer; Knight

Statistics
- Total inductees: 10
- Ribbon bar

The Order of the Black Eagle (Albanian: Urdhëri i Shqiponjës së Zezë) was the highest title that could be bestowed on a citizen of the Principality of Albania. The order was established by Wilhelm, Prince of Albania, in 1914 on the example of the Prussian Order of the Black Eagle. The order had a black eagle and around the words Besë e Bashkim (English: Fidelity and Union).

Since the Principality of Albania was short-lived, the order was awarded very few times, and is considered today very rare for collectors. It is also considered to be the first award ever given in modern Albania.

== See also ==
- Orders, decorations and medals of Albania
