= Moretti and Sorrento =

Moretti and Sorrento refers to a thematic catalogue of the works of Niccolò Paganini. The catalogue was commissioned in 1982 by the city of Genoa in celebration of the bicentenary of Paganini's birth. It was edited by Maria Rosa Moretti and Anna Sorrento, hence the abbreviation "MS" is assigned to Paganini's catalogued works.

== See also ==
- List of compositions by Niccolò Paganini
- 24 Caprices for Solo Violin (Paganini)
- Opus number
