= Marco Rogliano =

Italian violinist

Marco Rogliano (born 1967) is an Italian violinist.

== Biography ==
Rogliano was born in Rome in 1967, and received his violin degree at the Santa Cecilia Conservatory under the guidance of Antonio Salvatore. After he studied at the Mozarteum in Salzburg with Ruggiero Ricci, the Chigiana Academy in Siena with Riccardo Brengola and the Stauffer Academy in Cremona with Salvatore Accardo. He was prize winner in various international competitions including the V. Bucchi in Rome (1988), the Young Soloists Selection in Helsingborg (Sweden 1989), the ARD Intern. Competition in Munich (1998) and the East and West Artists Intern. Selection in New York (2002).

Rogliano made his debut as a soloist in 1989 performing the Sibelius Violin Concerto in Sweden with the Helsingborg Symphony Orchestra conducted by Ari Rasilainen. Afterward he has played with orchestras such as Moscow Radio Symphony at the Ciajkovskij Hall, Berliner Symphoniker at the Berlin Philharmony Hall, RAI National Symphony Orchestra in Turin, Sicily Symphony Orchestra in Palermo, Italian Chamber Orchestra, Pomeriggi Musicali Symphony Orchestra in Milan with conductors like Lior Shambadal, Gunter Neuhold, Salvatore Accardo, Franco Petracchi, Marco Angius, Tito Ceccherini.

In July 2009 he made his debut in China playing the Paganini Violin Concerto n.4 with the Macao Symphony Orchestra for the season closing Concert. Furthermore, he played for recitals in international contests like the St. Petersburg Philharmony Hall, the Weill Recital Hall at the New York Carnegie Hall, the Tokyo Casals Hall and Asahi Hall, the Munich Prinzregententheater and Herkulessaal, the S. Cecilia Academy Hall, the Alla Scala theatre, the Parma and Turin Teatro Regio.

He has collaborated with artists such as Reiko Watanabe, Ingolf Turban, Bruno Giuranna, Danilo Rossi, Enrico Dindo, Hansjorg Schellenberger, Alexander Lonquich, Gianluca Luisi, Roberto Cominati, Andrea Lucchesini, Shuku Iwasaki, Lucio Gallo.

His performances have been broadcast by RAI, Radio France, Bayerischer Rundfunk, BBC and many others. He won the Diapason d'Or with his recording of Allegoria della Notte for Violin and Orchestra by S.Sciarrino for Kairos, and his 25 caprices by N. Paganini released for Tactus in 2001 (the second Italian after Accardo) were acclaimed by magazines like Fanfare, Gramophone, Diapason (5 stars), Le Monde de la musique (4 stars). Furthermore, he dedicated particular attention on bringing out many Italian rarities for violin of 19th and 20th centuries recording as a first the Humoreske and Leggenda for Violin and Orchestra by O. Respighi for Inedita, the complete works with piano by O. Respighi, the Violin Sonata and Poemetto by A. Zanella, the 4 Seasons by Vivaldi together with Seasons by A. Guarnieri (best CD Amadeus) for Tactus.

He has been particularly appreciated by many contemporary composers dedicating their works to him like S. Sciarrino, R. Molinelli, A. Guarnieri, C. Ambrosini, G. Manca, G. Taglietti, M. Dall'Ongaro, C. Galante, C. De Pirro, D. Nicolau. He is presently Chairman of Chamber Music and Violin at the G.B.Pergolesi Conservatory of Fermo and collaborated with different academies like the Pavia Music Academy, Steinway Academy in Verona and was invited in many Italian Conservatories and the Mozarteum in Salzburg for master classes. He plays a violin by Nicola Bergonzi (Cremona 1790) trusted from the Maggini Foundation of Langenthal in Switzerland.

His last important CD releases are dedicated to rarities like the music with piano by Liszt (A. Dindo, piano) for the magazine Amadeus, the first recording of the complete works with piano by Thuille for Naxos (G. Luisi, piano) and the first recording of Sciarrino "Stagioni Artificiali" for violin and ensemble (M. Angius, conductor) with Stradivarius.

Official website

== Discography ==
- Niccolò Paganini 24 Capricci e Caprice D'adieu (Tactus)
- Antonio Vivaldi Quattro Stagioni - Ensemble Respighi - Cond. F. Ferri (Tactus)
- Salvatore Sciarrino Allegoria della notte (1985) per Violino e Orch. (World First Recording) RAI National Symph. Orch. - Cond. T. Ceccherini (Kairos)
- Antonio Guarnieri Stagioni - AnnaMaria Morini, flauto Ensemble Respighi - Cond. F. Ferri (Tactus)
- Ottorino Respighi Humoreske e Leggenda per Violino e Orch. (World First Recording) Sassari Symphony Orch. - Cond. R. Tigani (Inedita)
- Ottorino Respighi Complete works for Violin and Piano, Maurizio Paciariello, piano (Tactus)
- Ludwig Thuille Complete works for Violin and Piano, Gianluca Luisi, piano (Naxos)
- Franz Liszt Works for Violin and Piano, Andrea Dindo, piano (Amadeus Magazine June 2011)
- Salvatore Sciarrino 6 Capricci (Accord)
- Nadir Vassena Triptych - Crucifixion - Ensemble Algoritmo - Cond. M. Angius (Altrisuoni)
- Ivan Fedele Mixtim, Arcipelago Moebius, Immagini da Escher, ecc. - Ensemble Algoritmo - Cond. M. Angius (Stradivarius)
- Christian Sinding 2 Sonate per Violino e Piano e Suite in F op.14, Maurizio Paciariello, piano (ASV-classical)
- Giuseppe Tartini Sonate a tre e Trillo del Diavolo (Tactus) Alessandra Talamo, 2° violino - Federico Ferri, violoncello - Daniele Proni, clavicembalo (Tactus)
- Ludwig van Beethoven 2 Romanze Sassari Symphony Orch. - Cond. R. Tigani (Inedita)
- Ludwig van Beethoven Konzert-Satz C major - Sassari Symphony Orch. - Cond. R. Tigani (Bongiovanni)
- Franz Berwald Concerto per Violino - Sassari Symphony Orch. - Cond. R. Tigani (Bongiovanni)
- Luigi Maurizio Tedeschi Musica da Camera con Arpa - Antonella Ciccozzi, arpa - Francesco Sorrentino, violoncello (Tactus)
- Amilcare Zanella Poemetto op.22, Sonata per Violino op.71 - Marco Alpi, piano (Tactus)
- Alessandro Rolla Sei Duo per Flauto e Violino - Daniele Ruggieri, flauto (Tactus)
- Alessandro Rolla Tre Duo Concertanti per Violino e Viola - Luca Sanzò, viola (Tactus)
- Salvatore Sciarrino Per Mattia, Trio n.2, Omaggio a Burri, Spazio inverso - Alter Ego Ensemble (Stradivarius)
