= Caprice No. 16 (Paganini) =

Capriccio composed by Niccolò Paganini

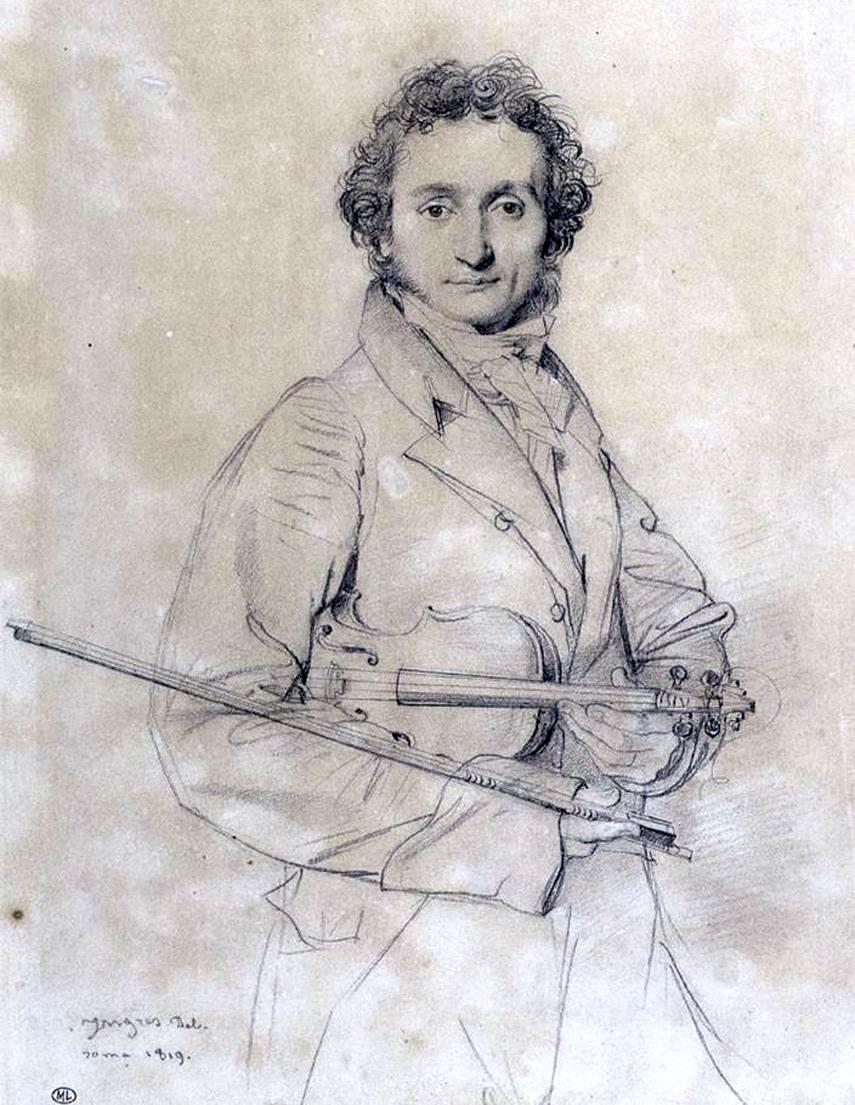
Niccolò Paganini, 1819

Caprice No. 16 in G minor is one of Niccolò Paganini's 24 Caprices. The meter is triple meter. The caprice consists of a continuous stream of 16th notes. The duration is approximately one and a half minutes.

== Structure ==
The first part shows the theme, requiring a player's ability of right-hand and left-hand bow control as it consists of arpeggios using either alternate adjacent strings or string jumping. The former requires the player the mastery of upper register, as it is difficult to control especially with the distance. The latter on the other hand requires the performer to master string skipping, where a player jumps from one string to another, rapidly over adjacent positions. The over-all required technique is detaché.

The second part is continuous —the earlier part is a consequent passage. The next area differentiates itself by the continued use of a quieter feel, with chromatic passages executed in slur phrases. By analysis, the second part is smorzando legato. It returns with a series of up and down arpeggios and scales increasing in intensity until the caprice's conclusion. The caprice appears to be brief since its entire length is executed in presto.
