= Sonata for Solo Violin (Prokofiev) =

Violin sonata composed by S. Prokofiev

- by Sergei Prokofiev
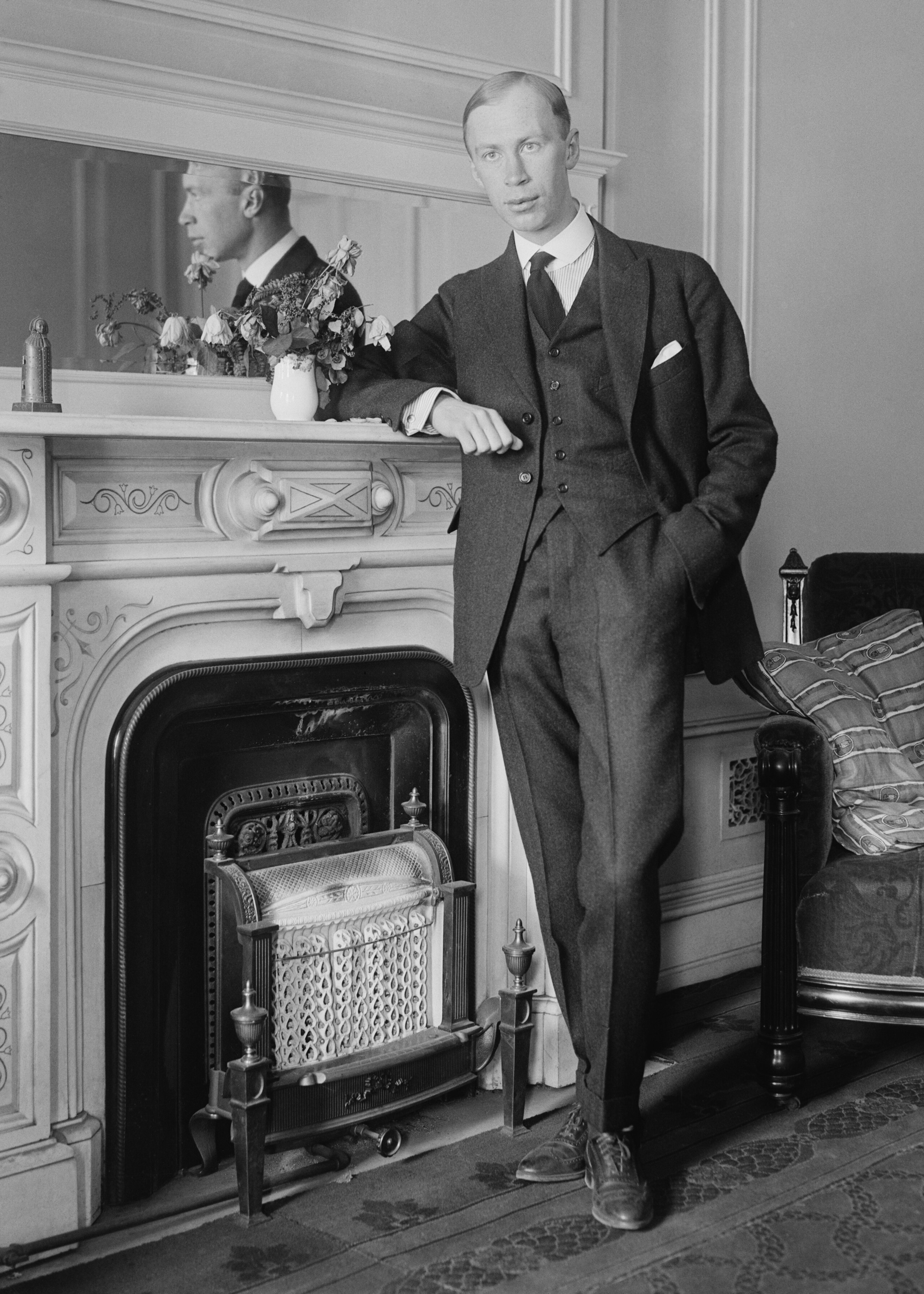
- Prokofiev c. 1918
- Key: D major
- Opus: 115
- Genre: Sonata
- Style: Neoclassical
- Composed: 1947
- Published: 1952
- Movements: Three
- Scoring: Unaccompanied violin or violins (in unison)

The Sonata for Solo Violin (or Sonata for Unaccompanied Violins in Unison) in D major, Opus 115, is a three-movement work for unaccompanied violin composed by Sergei Prokofiev in 1947. It was commissioned by the Soviet Union's Committee of Arts Affairs as a pedagogical work for talented violin students. It is therefore a non-virtuosic piece, and was originally designed to be played not by one soloist but by multiple young performers in unison. It was not performed until 10 July 1959 - six years after Prokofiev's death - by Ruggiero Ricci at the Moscow Conservatory.

== Structure and Analysis ==
The three movements of the sonata are as follows:

1. Moderato
2. Andante dolce. Tema con variazioni
3. Con brio. Allegro precipitato

The work is composed in Classical style and its melodies are largely diatonic. The first movement is in sonata form, the second movement is a theme with five variations, and the third movement has characteristics of a mazurka.
