= César Lecat de Bazancourt =

French military historian

César Lecat baron de Bazancourt (1810–1865) was a French military historian and a director of the library of Compiègne under Louis Philippe.

He was born in Paris and was appointed official historiographer by Napoleon III, whom he accompanied during several campaigns. The results of these expeditions appeared in his works on L'Expédition de Crimée jusqu'à la prise de Sébastopol, chronique de la guerre d'Orient (1856); La campagne d'Italie de 1859, chronique de la guerre (1859); and Les expéditions de Chine et de Cochinchine (two volumes, 1861–62).

== Other works ==
- History
  - Histoire de Sicile sous la domination des Normands (1846)
- Novels
  - Georges le montagnard (1851)
  - Noblesse oblige (1851)
  - La princesse Pallianci (1852)
