= History of the Jews in Albania =

Albanian Jews
Hebrenjtë Shqiptarë
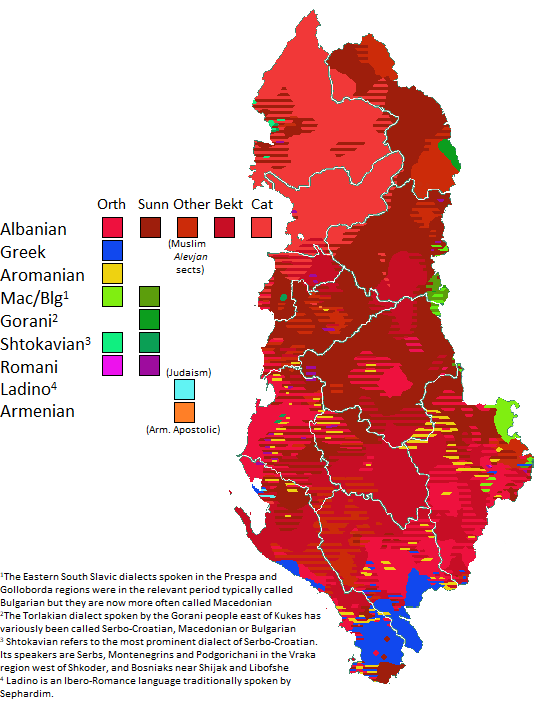
- Traditional distribution of Ladino-speaking Jews of Albania in the area of Vlorë, highlighted in turquoise on the map.

Total population
- 40-50

Regions with significant populations
- Tirana

Languages
- Albanian (presently) Ladino (historically), Yevanitika language (historically)

Religion
- Judaism

Related ethnic groups
- Jews (Kosovo Jews, Albanian Jews)

The history of the Jews in Albania dates back about 2,000 years. According to historian Apostol Kotani (Albania and the Jews): "Jews may have first arrived in Albania as early as 70 C.E. as captives on Roman ships that washed up on the country's southern shores... descendants of these captives that would build the first synagogue in the southern port city of Sarandë in the fifth century... Little is known about the Jewish community in the area until the 15th century." "According to Jewish Studies scholar Melsen Kafilaj, the claims regarding a first- or second-century Jewish presence in this area lack historical and archaeological documentation. Kafilaj notes that there are no records in contemporary Greek, Latin, or Jewish textual sources, nor any archaeological artifacts from that period to support the hypothesis."

In the early 16th century, there were Jewish settlements in most of major cities of Albania such as Berat, Elbasan, Vlorë, Durrës and also they are reported as well in Kosovo region. These Jewish families were mainly of Sephardi origin and descendants of the Spanish and Portuguese Jews expelled from Iberia in the end of 15th century. Present-day Albanian Jews, predominantly of Romaniote and Sephardi origin, have in modern times only constituted a very small percentage of the population.

During the Italian occupation, which coincided with World War II, Albania was the only country in Nazi-occupied Europe that saw an increase in its Jewish population, because Albanian Jews were not turned over to the Germans thanks to an Albanian set of laws which is known as the Besa from the Kanun.

During the communist dictatorship of Enver Hoxha which was named the People's Socialist Republic of Albania, all religions were banned in the country from February 1967 to 1990, including Judaism, in adherence to the doctrine of state atheism, and all foreign influences were also restricted. In the post-communist era, these policies have been abandoned and freedom of religion is permitted, although the number of practicing Jews in Albania is very small today, with many Jews having made aliyah to Israel.

== Ancient period ==
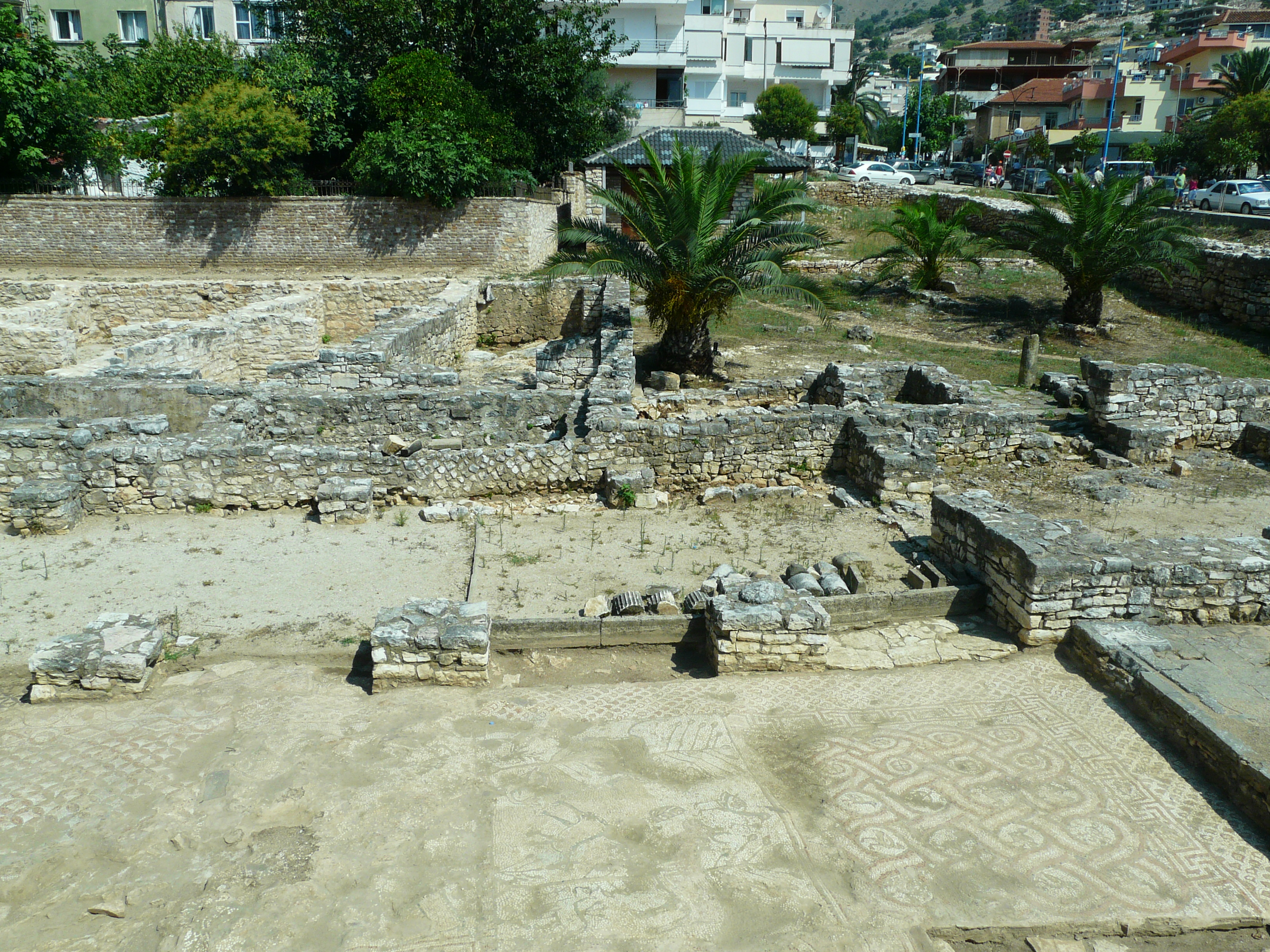
Ruins of the ancient synagogue found in Saranda

First reports of Jews living in Albania date from the 70 CE, with it being thought that Jews first arrived as captives on Roman ships that shipwrecked and washed up on the shores of southern Albania.

The descendants of these refugees, according to Albanian historian Apostol Kotani, would found Albania's first synagogue in the fourth or fifth century, in the city of Onchesmos, modern day Saranda. At this city on the Adriatic coast, opposite the Greek island of Corfu, the remains of the synagogue dating from 3rd or 4th century (and enlarged in the 5th or 6th century) were excavated in 2003-2004. Albanian archaeologists apparently first discovered remains in the 1980s; the ban on religion by the then Communist regime prevented them from further exploring what was already thought to be a religious site.

The subject matter of the exceptional mosaics found at the site suggested a Jewish past, leading to a joint project between archaeologists from the Institute of Archaeology in Tirana and the Hebrew University Institute of Archaeology in Jerusalem. According to archaeologists Gideon Foerster and Ehud Netzer of the Hebrew University of Jerusalem, “five stages were identified in the history of the site. In the two early stages fine mosaic pavements (2nd to 4th century), probably part of a private home, preceded the later synagogue and church. In the third stage several rooms were added, the largest of these containing a mosaic pavement representing in its centre a menorah flanked by a shofar (ram’s horn) and an etrog (citron), all symbols associated with Jewish festivals. Mosaic pavements also decorated the other rooms. A large basilical hall added in the last two stages of the history of the site (5th to 6th century) represents the heyday of the Jewish community of Anchiasmon (Onchesmos), the ancient name of Saranda.”

In sixth century Venosa (in Italy) there are references to Jews hailing from Onchesmos, which was also called Anchiasmos. The synagogue in Onchesmos was supplanted by a Christian church in the sixth century.

== Medieval and Ottoman period ==
In the 12th century, Benjamin of Tudela visited the area and recorded the presence of Jews.

In the thirteenth century, a Jewish community existed in Durrës and was employed in the salt trade. In Vlorë during 1426, the Ottomans supported the settlement of a Jewish community involved in mercantile activities. The Vlorë community underwent population growth in subsequent decades with Jews migrating from Corfu, Venetian ruled lands, Naples, France and the Iberian Peninsula. Approximately seventy Jewish families from Valencia settled in Vlorë between 1391 and 1492. Following the expulsion of Jews from Spain in 1492, the Ottoman state resettled additional Jewish exiles in Vlorë toward the end of the fifteenth century. Ottoman censuses from 1506 and 1520 recorded the Jewish population in Vlorë as consisting of 528 families. The Spanish expulsions also resulted in the formation of a Jewish community in Ottoman Berat that consisted of 25 families between 1519–1520.

In 1501 following the establishment of Ottoman rule, the Durrës Jewish community experienced population growth, as did the Jewish population in Elbasan and Lezhë. Ottoman censuses for 1506 and 1520 recorded the Jewish population as consisting of 528 families and some 2,600 people in Vlorë. The Jews of Vlorë were involved in trade and the city imported items from Europe and exported spices, leather, cotton fabrics, velvets, brocades and mohair from the Ottoman cities of Istanbul and Bursa."During that time in Avlona existed 4 different Jewish Communities; Sephardic Jews, Portuguese Jews, Italian Jews (mostly from Naples and Puglia) and Romaniote Jews. According to scholar and specialist of Jewish Studies Melsen Kafilaj 3 famous Rabbis and Philosophers lived in Avlona (Vlora) during this period: 1) R. Joseph ibn Verga, R. David ben Judah Messer Leon and R. Moses ben Jacob Albelda.

Jews avoided settling in the city of Shkodra as unlike elsewhere in Albania, they perceived it to be the site of "fanatical" religious tensions, and the local rulers would not give them the same rights that Jews were receiving elsewhere in the Empire.

It is thought that the beginning of the Jewish community in Elbasan was in 1501 but when Evliya Çelebi visited the city he reported that there were no Jews, nor any "Franks, Armenians, Serbs or Bulgars"; Edmond Malaj argues that Celebi was simply unaware of the local Jewish neighborhood which existed in the city, which had its own Jewish market.

After the Battle of Lepanto (1571) and the deterioration of security along the Ottoman controlled Adriatic and Ionian coasts, the numbers of Jews within Vlorë decreased. The Berat and Vlorë Jewish communities took an active role in the welfare of other Jews such as managing to attain the release of war related captives present in Durrës in 1596.

In 1673, Sabbatai Zevi was exiled by the sultan to the Albanian port of Ulqin, also called Ulcinj, now in Montenegro, dying there three years later. Followers of Sabbatai Zevi existed in Berat among Jews during the mid sixteenth century.

The Jewish community of Yanina renewed the Jewish communities of Kavajë, Himarë, Delvinë, Vlorë, Elbasan and Berat in the nineteenth century.

== 1900–1939 ==
During the Albanian nationalist revolts of 1911, Ottoman officials accused the Jewish community of colluding with and protecting Albanian nationalist rebels.

Vlorë was the site of Albania's only synagogue until it was destroyed in the First World War.

Another interesting fact confirmed scientifically by the scholar and specialist of Jewish Studies, Melsen Kafilaj, based on his research in the Leo Back Archives — Berlin, is that in the first part of the 20th Century, and specifically in the year 1915, we have the first rafiguration of the Albanian Jew in European Art, realized in Vilna, Lithuania by the Jewish-German artist, Hermann Struck..https://gazetadielli.com/imazhi-i-hebreut-shqiptar-ne-artin-evropian/

According to the Albanian census of 1930, there were only 204 Jews registered at that time in Albania. The official recognition of the Jewish community was granted on April 2, 1937, while at that time this community consisted in about 300 members. With the rise of Nazi Germany a number of German and Austrian Jews took refuge in Albania. Still in 1938 the Albanian Embassy in Berlin continued to issue visas to Jews, at a time when no other European country was willing to take them. One of the major Albanologists Norbert Jokl asked for Albanian citizenship, which was granted to him immediately; but this could not save him from concentration camps.

== World War II ==
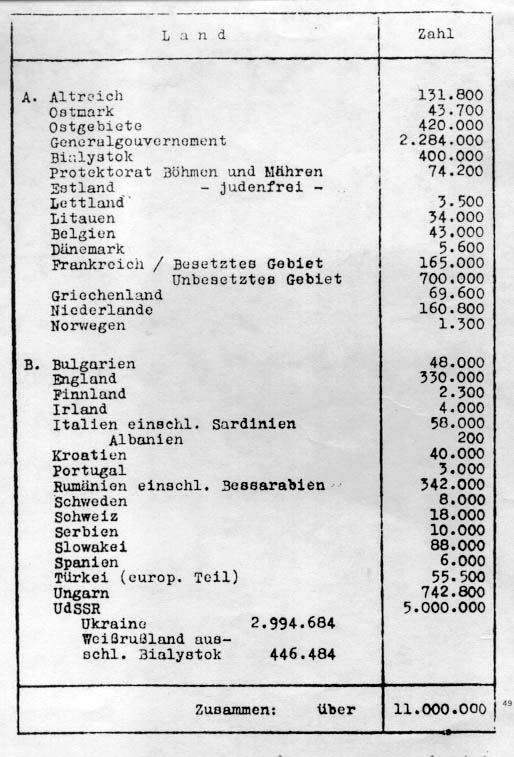
A list of European Jews compiled by the Nazis at the Wannsee Conference in January 1942. Albania is listed as having 200 Jews.

Albania had about 200 Jews at the beginning of the war. It subsequently became a safe haven for several hundred Jewish refugees from other countries. At the Wannsee Conference in 1942, Adolf Eichmann, planner of the mass murder of Jews across Europe, estimated the number of Jews in Albania that were to be killed at 200. Nevertheless, Jews in Albania remained protected by the local Christian and Muslim population and this protection continued even after the capitulation of Italy on September 8, 1943. At the end of the war, Albania had a population of 2,000 Jews. During the Second World War, Jews were concealed in the homes and basements of 60 families from the Muslim and Christian communities in Berat.

Albania was the only European nation directly affected by the war to have come out of the Second World War with a higher Jewish population at the end of the war than at the start of the war.

== Communist era ==
Throughout Albania's era of communist rule under the dictatorship of Enver Hoxha, the Jewish community was isolated from the Jewish world, but its isolation was not caused by specifically anti-Jewish measures. In order to forge a sustainable form of national unity as well as the new system of socialism, Hoxha banned confessional loyalties across the religious spectrum. In this manner, the fate of the Jewish community was inextricably linked to the fate of Albanian society as a whole.

All religions were strictly banned in the country. After the fall of Communism in 1991, nearly all of the Jews of Albania emigrated. Because they were not victims of anti-Semitism, their primary reasons for leaving Albania were economic. Some 298 Albanian Jews emigrated to Israel (mostly settling in Ashdod and Karmiel) and about 30 others moved to the United States. About a dozen Jews, most of whom were married to non-Jews, chose to remain in Albania.

== Jews in present-day Albania ==
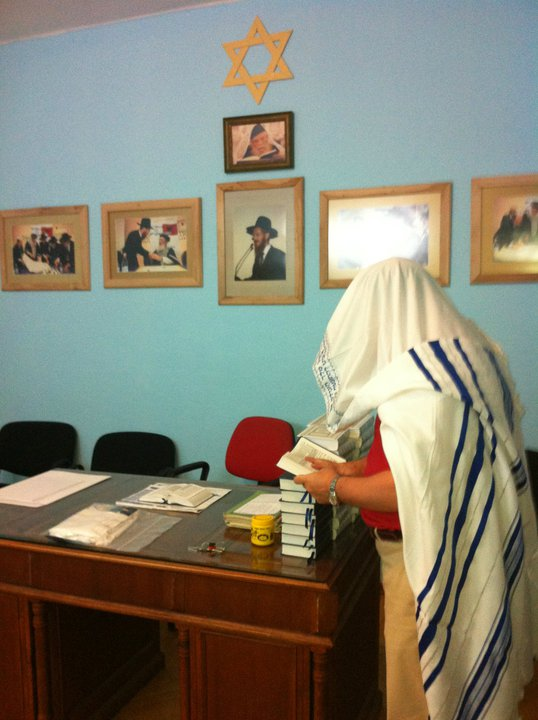
Rite in the Tirana Synagogue, 2011

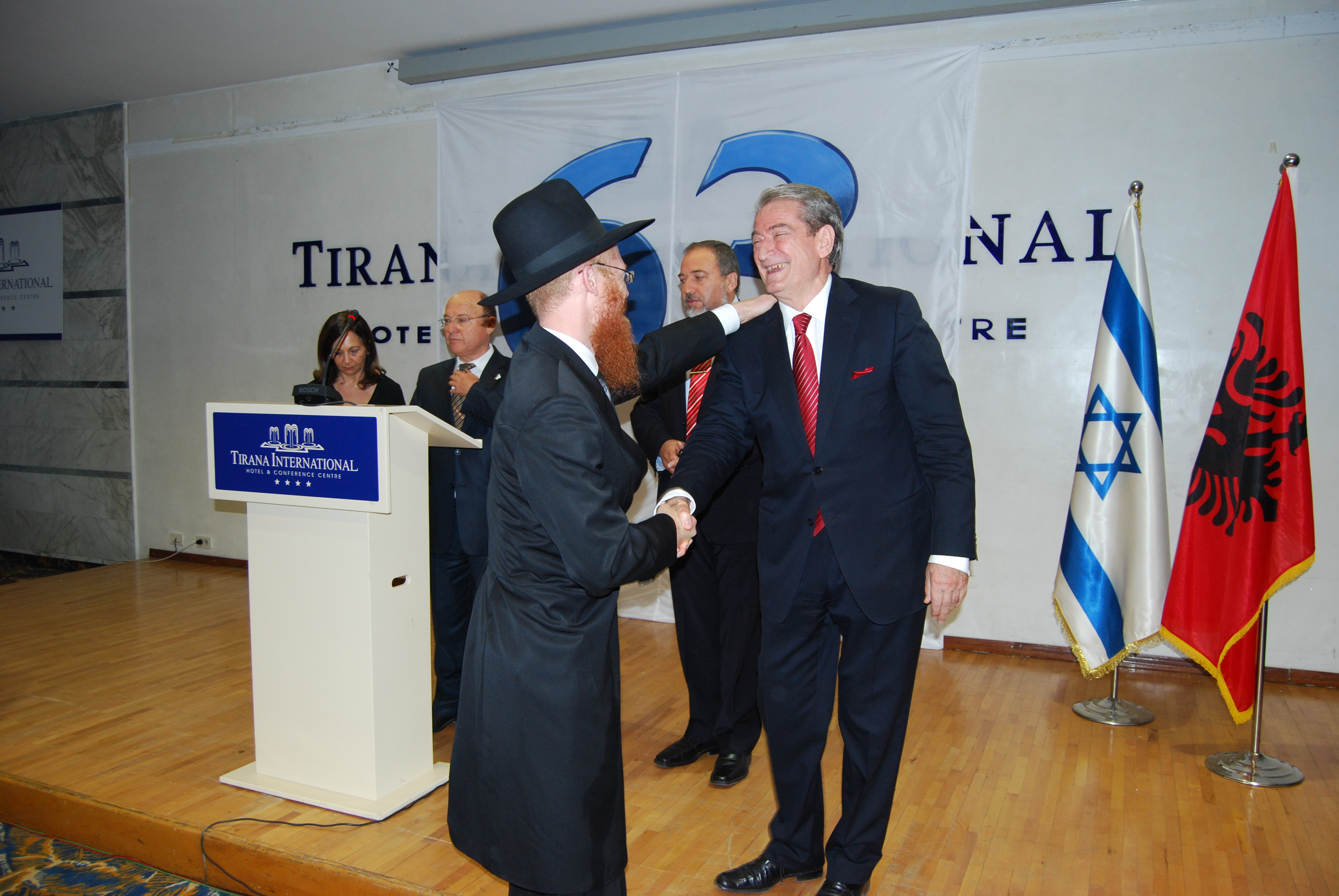
The Prime Minister of Albania Sali Berisha meeting with Rabbi Yoel Kaplan in Tirana

Today, around 40 to 50 Jews are living in Albania, most of them are living in the capital, Tirana. An old synagogue was discovered in the city of Saranda and a new synagogue which is known as "Hechal Shlomo" started providing services to the Jewish community in Tirana in December 2010. A synagogue still exists in Vlorë, but it is no longer in use. Also in December 2010, Rabbi Joel Kaplan was inaugurated as the first chief rabbi of Albania by the former Albanian Prime Minister Sali Berisha and the Chief Rabbi of Israel Shlomo Amar. A Jewish Community Center which is named "Moshe Rabbenu" was also inaugurated in Tirana, in total disaccordance with the Jewish community who denies Kaplan's status of chief rabbi, partly because they were never consulted. Kaplan is an emissary or shaliach of the Chabad or Lubavitch sect of Hasidic Judaism.

In the late 2010s, a Jewish history museum which is named the "Solomon Museum" was established in southern Berat and it contains exhibits about the Holocaust in Albania and the survival of Jews in the country during the war.

In early July 2020, a Holocaust Memorial was unveiled in Tirana and it honors Albanians who safeguarded Jews from Nazi persecution during the Second World War. Among those who were in attendance were prime minister Edi Rama and the US and Israeli ambassadors.

On 22 October 2020, the Albanian parliament adopted the International Holocaust Remembrance Alliance's Working Definition of Antisemitism to support international efforts in combating antisemitism, becoming the first Muslim-majority country to do so.

Partnering with the Jewish Agency for Israel and the New York-based Combat Antisemitism Movement (CAM), Albania hosted the first meeting of The Balkans Forum Against Anti-Semitism on 28 October 2020, which was held online due to the COVID-19 pandemic. The participants included Prime minister Edi Rama, U.S. Secretary of State Michael R. Pompeo and other high ranking officials from the local region, wider Europe and the US.

Prime Minister Edi Rama has been commended for his efforts to fight antisemitism.

In August 2026, Rabbi Mendy Kotlarsky, a leading figure of the international Chabad-Lubavitch network, visited Albania in connection with efforts to strengthen Jewish life in the country and deepen ties between the Jewish Community of Albania and Chabad's international network.

As executive director of Merkos 302, Chairman of CTeen, JewQ, and the Roving Rabbis, Rabbi Kotlarsky proposed areas of cooperation included strengthening Jewish education, youth programs, assistance for Jewish and Israeli visitors, and closer links between Albania and international Jewish communities.

The Jewish Community of Albania characterized the visit as a historic moment and the beginning of a new chapter of cooperation with Chabad-Lubavitch and its global network.

== Notable Jews of Albanian origin ==
- Robert Shvarc, translator

== See also ==
- Albania–Israel relations
- Israelization of Albania
