= History of the Jews in Yugoslavia =

See main article about Yugoslavia.
Note: Yugoslavia was a country in Southeast Europe and Central Europe for most of the 20th century. It came into existence after World War I in 1918 under the name of the Kingdom of Serbs, Croats and Slovenes by the merger of the provisional State of Slovenes, Croats and Serbs and the kingdoms of Serbia and Montenegro. Yugoslavia broke apart in the 1990s to form the following 5 countries: Bosnia and Herzegovina, Croatia, Republic of Macedonia, Slovenia, Federal Republic of Yugoslavia (FRY). In 2003, the FRY was reconstituted as the federation of Serbia and Montenegro. In 2006, it was split into the separate countries of: Montenegro and Serbia. Kosovo is part of the former Yugoslavia.

History of the Jews in Yugoslavia see:

- History of the Jews in Bosnia and Herzegovina.
- History of the Jews in Croatia.
- History of the Jews in Kosovo.
- History of the Jews in North Macedonia.
- History of the Jews in Montenegro.
- History of the Jews in Serbia.
- History of the Jews in Slovenia.
