= Solomon Museum =

Jewish museum in Berat, Albania

- Muzeu Solomon
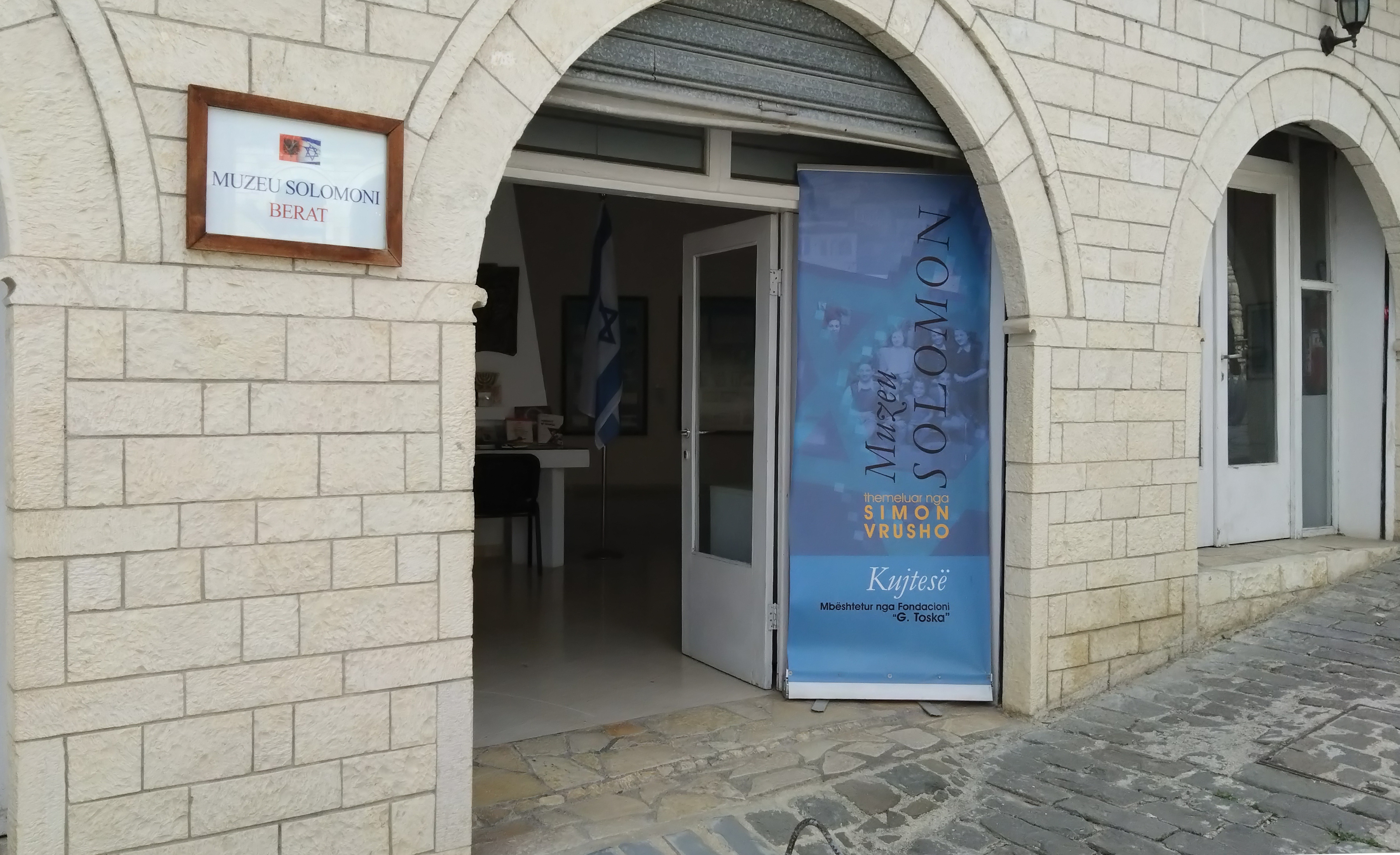
- Established: 2018; 8 years ago
- Location: Berat, Albania
- Coordinates: 40.7064°N 19.9482°E
- Type: history of the Jewish community in Albania
- Founder: Professor Simon Vrusho
- Director: Angjlina Vrusho

The Solomon Museum (Albanian: Muzeu Solomon, also called the "Solomoni Museum") is a museum in the Albanian city of Berat devoted to the history of the Jewish community in Albania.

== History ==
Opened in 2018 by Professor Simon Vrusho, who ran it with his own pension and small donations, the museum was on the brink of closure after Vrusho passed away. However, Gazmend Toska, a French-Albanian businessperson, read about the museum and its possible fate, and paid for the relocation of the museum to a larger place in the city, which relocation took place on September 29, 2019. The museum is unique among its peers for telling the stories of how Albanians saved almost 2,000 Jews from the Holocaust, following the Albanians' centuries-old Besa code of honor.

== Collections ==
The museum has documents, photos, and items that have belonged to the Jewish community, who arrived in Berat in the 16th century from Spain, fleeing the Inquisition. Albania is the only Nazi-occupied territory whose Jewish population increased during World War II. The museum's current director is Angjelina Vrusho, Simon Vrusho's wife.
