= The Holocaust in Albania =

- Part of The Holocaust and World War II
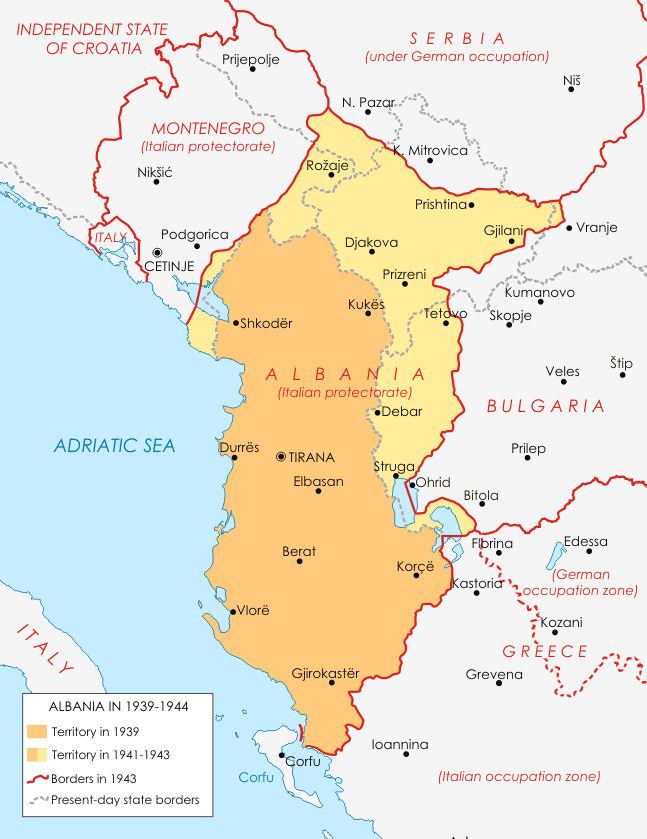
- A map of Albania during World War II, with territories annexed to Albania-proper shown in light yellow.
- Location: Italian- and German-occupied Albania
- Date: 1941–1944
- Target: Jews
- Attack type: Genocide
- Deaths: c. 600
- Perpetrators: Nazi Germany and its collaborators
- Defenders: Local Albanian population (of which 75 recognized by Yad Vashem) and defective Albanian fascist authorities

The Holocaust saw crimes committed against Jews in Albania while Albania was under Italian and German occupation during World War II. Throughout the war, nearly 2,000 Jews sought refuge in Albania-proper. Most of these Jewish refugees were treated well by the local population, despite the fact that Albania-proper was occupied first by Fascist Italy, and then by Nazi Germany. Albanians often sheltered Jewish refugees in mountain villages and transported them to Adriatic ports from where they fled to Italy. Other Jews joined resistance movements throughout the country.

For the 500 Jews who lived in Kosovo, the experience was starkly different, and about 40 percent did not survive the war. With the surrender of Italy in September 1943, Germany occupied Albania. In 1944, an Albanian Waffen-SS division, the 21st Waffen Mountain Division of the SS Skanderbeg was formed, which arrested and handed over to the Germans 281 Jews from Kosovo who were subsequently deported to the Bergen-Belsen concentration camp, where many were killed. In late 1944, the Germans were driven out of Albania-proper and the country became a communist state under the leadership of Enver Hoxha. Around the same time, Axis forces in the Albanian-annexed regions of Kosovo and western Macedonia were defeated by the Yugoslav Partisans, who subsequently reincorporated these areas into Yugoslavia.

Approximately 600 Jews were killed in Axis-occupied Albania during the Holocaust. In Albania-proper, five Jews from the same family were killed by the Germans, the only native Jews to be killed there over the course of the war. Albania-proper emerged from the war with a population of Jews eleven times greater than at the beginning, numbering around 1,800. Most of these subsequently emigrated to Israel. Several hundred remained in Albania until the fall of Communism in the early 1990s before doing the same. There is no academic consensus as to why Jewish survival rates in Albania-proper differed so drastically from those in Kosovo. Some scholars have argued that the traditional code of honour known as besa, an important part of the culture of Albania-proper, played a role. Other academics have suggested the cause was the relative lenience of the Italian occupying authorities in 1941–1943, Germany's failure to seek out Jews in Albania-proper in 1943–1944 as thoroughly as they had in other countries, and also the Kosovo Albanians' distrust of foreigners. As of 2018, 75 citizens of Albania had been recognized by Yad Vashem as Righteous Among the Nations.

== Background ==
=== Post-Ottoman period ===
According to the Albanian census of 1930, 24 Jews lived in Albania. In 1937, the Jewish community, which then numbered nearly 300, was granted official recognition in the country by King Zog. Before the war, Albanian Jews predominantly lived in the southern part of the country, mostly in the city of Vlorë, which had been approximately one-third Jewish in the 16th century. The Jewish community in Albanian-majority Kosovo, part of neighboring Yugoslavia, numbered approximately 500. In the late Ottoman era, Albanian national ideology had developed in such a way that it claimed affiliation with no one religion and aimed for reconciliation among the various faiths in the country. Following Albania's independence in 1912, the country's government began implementing an ideology of religious reconciliation, and this became marked under Zog's rule, when the equality of "all faiths" was codified and greater religious diversity promoted.

During the 1930s, the Jewish community became increasingly integrated into Albanian society, with official government recognition on 2 April 1937. Zog went further and aided Jewish immigration to Albania and helped the integration of new Jewish arrivals. In 1934, Herman Bernstein, the American ambassador to Albania, who was Jewish himself, remarked that Jews were not discriminated against in the country because it "happens to be one of the rare lands in Europe today where religious prejudice and hate do not exist". With the rise of Nazism, a number of German Jews and Austrian Jews took refuge in Albania, and the Albanian embassy in Berlin continued to issue visas to Jews until the end of 1938, at a time when no other European country was willing to do so. (Note: An urban legend that appears to have originated in the 21st century contends that the physicist Albert Einstein used Albania as a transit point out of Central Europe, that he was sheltered in Tirana and was issued an Albanian passport by King Zog, which he subsequently used to escape to the United States. The exhibit dedicated to the Holocaust in Tirana's National History Museum contains a photograph of Einstein, accompanied by a caption making this claim. The claim later appeared in the documentary Rescue in Albania, as well as in numerous social media posts, and several mainstream news articles. Edith Harxhi, Albania's Deputy Minister of Foreign Affairs, repeated the claim during an OSCE conference on tolerance and anti-discrimination in May 2013. According to Barbara Wolff, the director of the Albert Einstein Archives at the Hebrew University of Jerusalem, there is no archival evidence to support the assertion that Einstein ever set foot in Albania or was issued an Albanian passport. The Einstein biographer Walter Isaacson concurs, stating that Einstein never visited Albania and that he used a Swiss passport to sail to the United States.) Bernstein played a critical role in persuading the Albanian government to continue issuing Jews tourist and transit visas. From 1933 onward, Bernstein's efforts resulted in many Jews escaping from Germany and Austria as the Nazi Party consolidated power, some of whom used Albania as a transit point from which to escape to the United States, Turkey, or South America.

=== Italian occupation ===
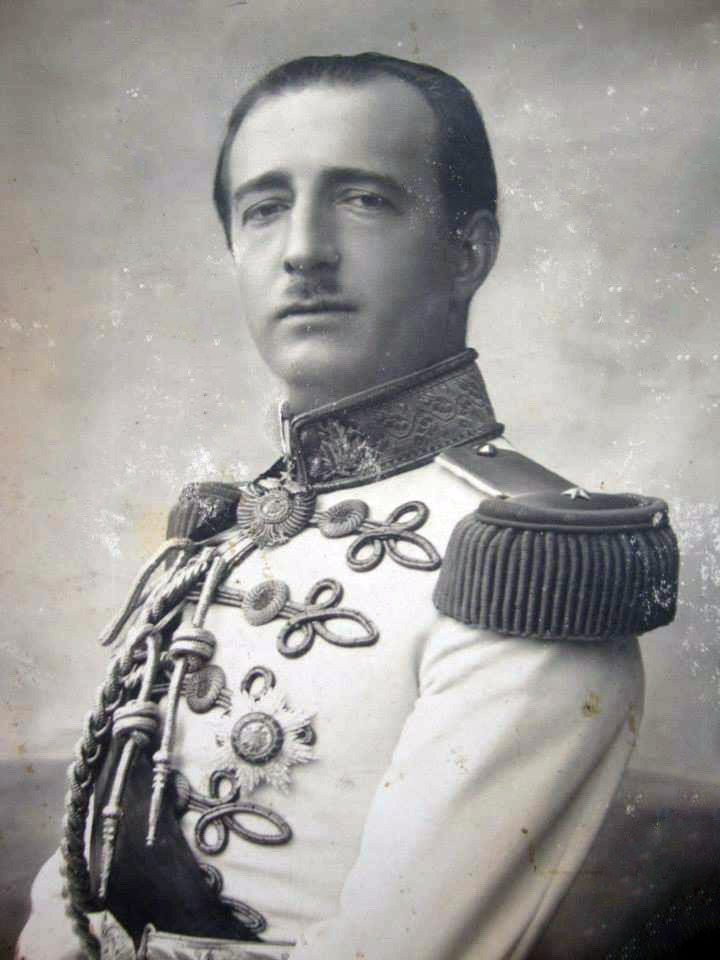
King Zog was deposed as Albania's ruler following the Italian invasion of Albania in April 1939

The least-developed country in Europe, Albania was subjected to Italian economic and political hegemony throughout the 1930s. On 25 March 1939, Italian dictator Benito Mussolini delivered Zog an ultimatum, demanding the acceptance of an Italian military protectorate over Albania. Zog refused, and on 7 April, Italy invaded Albania and deposed him. A quisling government was installed shortly thereafter, headed by Albania's wealthiest and most powerful landowner, Shefqet Vërlaci. Also formed was an Albanian "national assembly", which quickly voted in favour of an economic and political union with Italy, thereby making the country an Italian protectorate. Under the direction of viceroy general Francesco Jacomoni, the Italian occupational authorities implemented laws that prohibited Jewish immigration to Albania, and mandated the deportation of all foreign Jews living in the country.

Within a month of the Italian occupation, the Albanian Fascist Party (Albanian: Partia Fashiste e Shqipërisë, or PFSh) was formed. It enacted laws that prevented Jews from joining it, and excluded them from professions such as education. Composed of ethnic Albanians and Italians residing in Albania, the party existed as a branch of the Italian Fascist Party (Italian: Partito Nazionale Fascista, or PNF) and its members were required to swear an oath of loyalty to Mussolini. All Albanian civil servants were required to join and it became the only legal political party in the country. As World War II progressed, Italy permitted occupied Albania to annex adjacent Albanian-inhabited territories to form Greater Albania, a protectorate of Italy that included most of Kosovo and a portion of western Macedonia, which had been detached from Yugoslavia after the Axis powers invaded that country in April 1941. Although officially under Italian rule, the Albanians in Kosovo were given control of the region and were encouraged to open Albanian schools, which had been prohibited under Yugoslav rule. They were also given Albanian citizenship by the Italian authorities, and permitted to fly the flag of Albania. The Italians stationed hundreds of thousands of soldiers in Greater Albania. Approximately 20,000 Italian soldiers and 5,000 policemen and frontier guards were stationed in Kosovo alone. An additional 12,000 soldiers and 5,000 policemen and border guards were stationed in the Albanian-annexed areas of modern-day North Macedonia. The Italian occupational authorities warned that at least ten hostages would be shot for every Italian soldier killed or wounded in the occupied Yugoslav territories.

== The Holocaust ==
=== 1939–1943 ===
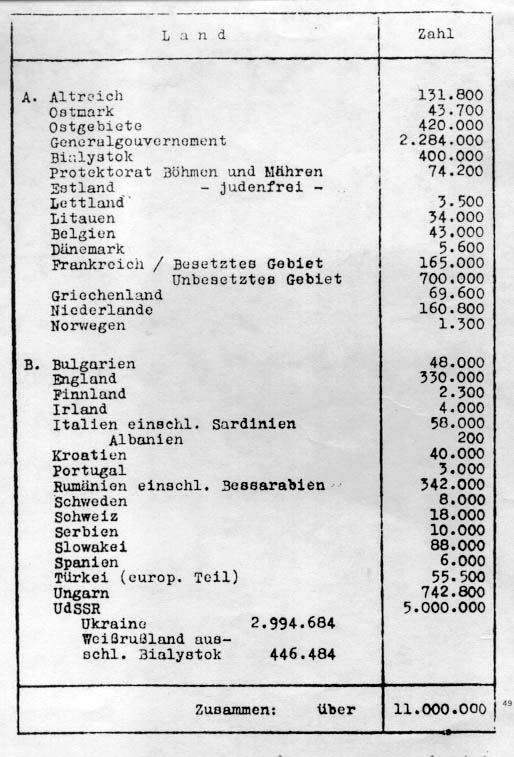
A list of European Jews compiled at the Wannsee Conference in January 1942. Albania is listed as having 200 Jews.

After the invasion of Yugoslavia, the Jewish community in Greater Albania grew as Jews from Macedonia and northern Serbia, as well as Jewish refugees from Germany, Austria, and Poland, came to Italian-controlled, Albanian-annexed Kosovo and settled in the towns of Pristina, Prizren, and Uroševac. As many as 1,000 refugees arrived, attributed by German sources to a Jewish organization which was responsible for smuggling Jews into the country. The refugees did not experience persecution at the level that Jews were experiencing in the German-controlled territories, because the Italians considered them to be of economic importance and "representative of Italian interests abroad". The Italians did arrest approximately 150 Jewish refugees and transfer them to the town of Berat, in Albania-proper, where they were given a chance to work. Also arrested were 192 Jews from the Italian-annexed Bay of Kotor, who were transferred to concentration camps in Albania-proper on 27/28 July 1941. They were subsequently transferred to camps in Italy.

The population of Albania-proper was very protective of the Jewish refugees. Many were transported to Albanian ports on the Adriatic from where they could travel to Italy. Others hid in remote mountain villages, while some joined resistance movements across the country. Hundreds of Jews received false documents from the Albanian authorities and were smuggled to Albania to safety. On other occasions, Jews were transferred to Albania-proper under the false pretext that they had typhus and needed hospital treatment. Under the direction of viceroy general Francesco Jacomoni, the Italian administration implemented laws that prohibited Jewish immigration to Greater Albania, and mandated the deportation of all foreign Jews in the country. However, these laws were implemented in a half-hearted manner, as evidenced by the fact that no Jews were deported under them, and while leaving the country became more difficult, immigration of foreign Jews to Greater Albania continued apace. When Jews were found crossing the border, they were usually released by the Albanian authorities to find shelter among local families. On some occasions, they were robbed and killed. In January 1942, the Germans estimated at the Wannsee Conference that Albania-proper was inhabited by 200 Jews. That month, Jews were interned by the Italians at a camp in Pristina. Though they feared that they would be handed over to the Germans, the camp's Italian commander promised that this would never happen. On 14 March 1942, the Italians blockaded the camp and arrested the Jews that had been detained there. Fifty-one were handed over to the Germans. They were subsequently transported to the Sajmište concentration camp, in the Independent State of Croatia, and killed. Others, together with Serbs, were taken to a camp in Berat, where they were held until Italy's capitulation. As many as 500 Jews were interned at the camps in Berat, Krujë, and Kavajë during the Italian occupation.

=== 1943–1945 ===
When Italy surrendered to the Allies in September 1943, all concentration camps in Greater Albania were dissolved. Shortly thereafter, the Germans invaded and occupied Greater Albania, and most of the Italian soldiers stationed in the country surrendered to the Germans. The German occupational authorities then began to target for extermination all of the Jews living in Albania-proper and the Albanian-dominated regions of Axis-occupied Yugoslavia. The Jewish community in western Macedonia, which had remained untouched under Italian occupation, was targeted and several groups of Jews were dispatched to extermination camps. Their property and belongings were later expropriated by multiple institutions, as well as by individuals.

The Germans arranged for Greater Albania's collaborationist government to be reorganized shortly after occupying the country. On 15 September, the Albanian National Committee was established under German sponsorship. It governed until a regency council was established and recognized by Germany as the country's official government on 3 November. Xhafer Deva, a Kosovo Albanian collaborator and German ally, was then appointed the Minister of Interior. Deva subsequently founded the collaborationist Second League of Prizren in Kosovo. Foreseeing the arrival of German troops, beginning in September 1943, the Jews of Albania-proper fled the cities and hid in the countryside, where they were concealed by rural Albanians. Some Jews feigned conversion to either Christianity or Islam while still maintaining a Jewish identity. With a new administration in place, the Germans demanded that the Albanian authorities provide them with lists of Jews to be deported. The local authorities did not comply, and even provided Jewish families with forged documents. In early 1944, the German occupational authorities again demanded that Albanian officials produce a list of all the Jews living in the country. Two local Jewish leaders subsequently approached Albania's collaborationist Prime Minister, Mehdi Frashëri, for assistance. Frashëri referred them to Deva, who had both a reputation for protecting Jews, as well as for ordering gratuitous acts of violence against his political opponents. Deva reportedly told the Jewish delegates that he already possessed a list of Jews living in Albania-proper. He refused to hand the list over to the Germans and rejected their requests to gather all the country's Jews in one place. Deva informed the Germans that he would not provide them with such a list because such demands constituted "interference in Albanian affairs". Shortly thereafter, Deva informed the leaders of the Jewish community that he had successfully refused the German request. In June 1944, the Germans once again demanded that the Albanian collaborationist government produce a list of the country's Jews and the Albanian authorities refused once more.

The situation in Kosovo was quite different. There, Deva began recruiting Kosovo Albanians to join the Waffen-SS. The 21st Waffen Mountain Division, nicknamed Skanderbeg, was formed on 1 May 1944. On 14 May, the division raided Jewish homes in Pristina, arrested 281 native and foreign Jews, and handed them over to the Germans. On 23 June, 249 of these Jews were taken to the Bergen-Belsen concentration camp, where many were murdered. As many as 2,000 Jews sought refuge in Greater Albania during the war. The number of Jews who successfully used Greater Albania for transit is difficult to estimate because of the clandestine nature of the rescue networks, but estimates range between 600 and 3,000. About 210 Kosovo Jews were killed. (Note: A comprehensive list of Jewish fatalities in Kosovo is non-existent. An official Yugoslav state report published in 1964 recorded 74 wartime deaths.) This represents a fatality rate of about 40 percent. Approximately 600 Jews were killed in all the Albanian-controlled territories over the course of the Holocaust. At least 177 of these were murdered at Bergen-Belsen. A somewhat greater number survived the war. Virtually all of the native Jews in Albania-proper survived the Holocaust, as did almost all the foreign Jews who sought refuge there. The only native Jews killed in Albania-proper were five members of the Ardet family. A sixth family member survived the war. Together with Denmark and Bulgaria, Albania-proper was one of the only Axis-occupied European countries where the majority of Jews were saved.

== Analysis ==
Opinions differ among scholars, as well as in public discourse, with regard to how to interpret the high survival rate of Jews in Albania-proper, as well as the stark contrast in survival rates in Albania-proper and Kosovo. Some experts have attributed the "exceptional difference" in Albania-proper to the besa, a traditional code of honour that was an important part of the culture of the Albanian highlands. The besa obligated Albanians to provide shelter and safe passage for anyone seeking protection, especially if they had sworn to do so. Failure to provide safe passage would result in a loss of prestige. Testimony from Jewish survivors, as well as from Albanian rescuers, has shown that many individual rescuers justified their actions by citing the besa. Traditionally, Albanian historiography has also emphasized the role of the besa, as well as other Albanian cultural values present at the turn of the century, to explain the high survival rate. The besa hypothesis has also been espoused by multiple foreign scholars. It has since come under criticism as an "almost folk explication" that is in fact "thoroughly limited", according to the historian Monika Stafa, who argues that "Albanian popular virtues" on their own could not possibly have successfully resisted the power of Nazi Germany's almost mathematical execution of its racial philosophy.

Stafa argues that the high rate of survival must also be attributed to a more complicated combination of factors. She cites the failure of the German occupational authorities to acquire detailed lists of Jews living in Albania-proper, the inaction of the Italian occupational authorities, as well as individual altruism, especially by individuals in positions of power. Stafa stresses the importance of the repeated refusal of the Albanian collaborationist authorities to hand over to the Germans a list of the country's Jews, noting that across Europe, the obstruction of German attempts to obtain comprehensive lists was associated with a 10 percent increase in a country's Jewish survival rate. Kosovo differed from Albania-proper in that the Germans managed to obtain lists of Jews, despite efforts by some Kosovo Albanian officials to prevent this. Fischer notes that the Germans acquiesced to the Albanian collaborationist government's refusal to hand over the lists because they wished to maintain the appearance that Germany was allowing Albania "relative independence". He also attributes the lack of an organized German effort to hunt down local Jews to this policy.

Kosovo Albanians tended to be more hostile towards foreigners, an attitude that the Professor Paul Mojzes attributes to the Albanian–Serbian conflict and persecution suffered at the hands of the Ottoman Empire. As a result, most Kosovo Albanians welcomed the defeat and partitioning of Yugoslavia, and were particularly grateful to any power that offered them their "dream of Greater Albania" and opportunities to "settle scores" with the local Serb population. Mojzes attributes the protection Jews received in Kosovo in the early years of the war to the relatively lenient attitude of the Italian occupational authorities rather than to the efforts of the local population. In Albania-proper, Mojzes argues that antisemitism was not widespread because there were very few Jews. According to Stafa, antisemitic legislation was often not enacted in Albania-proper by the Italian authorities. Fischer notes that when antisemitic legislation was adopted, as it was in 1940, it was applied in a half-hearted way. He also states that Jews felt little need to hide their identities during the Italian period, and even celebrated their traditional holidays in public. Fischer instead attributes the Albanians' relative tolerance towards the Jews to "deeper religious tolerance" that was encouraged by Albania-proper's religious diversity.

== Aftermath and legacy ==
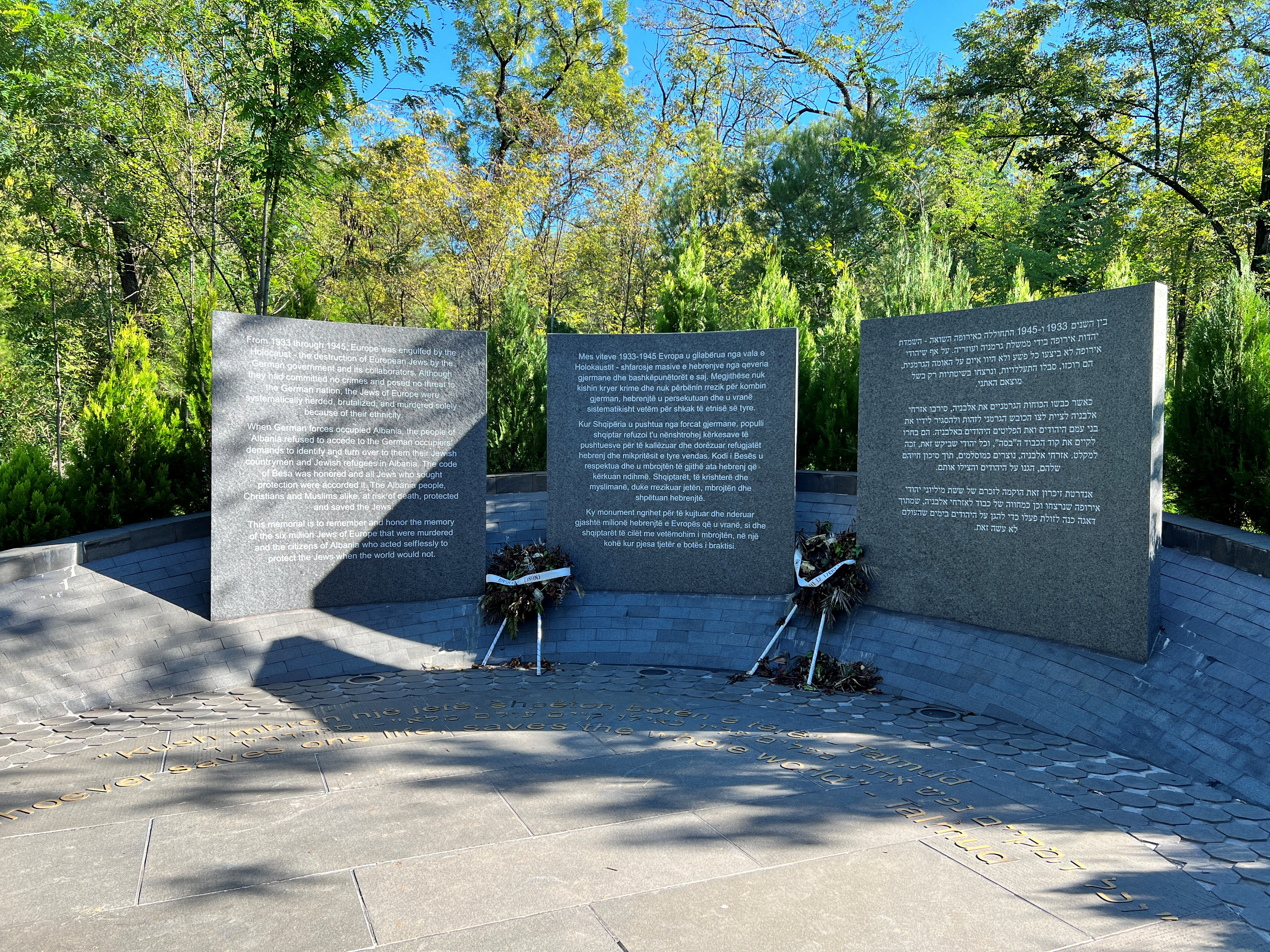
The Holocaust Memorial in the Grand Park of Tirana. It was designed by Stephen Jacobs and unveiled in 2020.

From October to November 1944, the Yugoslav Partisans, supported by both the Western Allies and the Soviet Union, and assisted by the forces of the Bulgarian Fatherland Front and two brigades of Albanian partisans, retook the region of Kosovo as the Germans withdrew. The area was reincorporated into Yugoslavia. With no chance of victory, the withdrawing Germans helped Albanian collaborators escape the country as the communists drew near. Many failed to escape and were executed by the communists upon capture.

On 28 November 1944, the Albanian Partisans, under the command of Enver Hoxha, emerged victorious in Albania-proper. Hoxha subsequently implemented a totalitarian Stalinist government that outlawed all religious activity in the country. It is estimated that there were 1,800 Jews in Albania-proper at the end of the Second World War. Albania's Jewish population increased eleven-fold between 1939 and 1945. The Jewish community in Kosovo never fully recovered from the war. Few Jews remained in Kosovo, and many emigrated to Israel during the communist period. Similarly, most of Albania's Jews decided to emigrate following the communist takeover.

In 1999, during the Kosovo War, Israel airlifted a group of Kosovo Albanians to safety and housed them in kibbutzim on Yom HaShoah (Holocaust Remembrance Day). The descendant of a Kosovo Albanian family that had sheltered Jews during the war stayed with the descendants of the family that they had sheltered. The only public space in Albania dedicated to the Holocaust is a small display inside Tirana's National Historical Museum. Consisting of photographs, texts, maps, and wartime documents, it was opened on 29 November 2004. A documentary film titled Rescue in Albania, about the survival of Albania's Jews, was released in 2009. In 2013, the Government of Kosovo erected a plaque in memory of the Kosovo Jews who perished during the Holocaust. As of 2018, 75 Albanians had been recognized by Yad Vashem as Righteous Among the Nations. In 2020, a monument to Albanian rescuers of Jews was unveiled in Tirana's Grand Park. In 2023, the Albanian government announced that in Tirana a museum will be established in honor of Albanian rescuers of Jews. In the same year, a Wall of Honor monument was erected in Prishtina's City Park (Parku i Qytetit) to commemorate the 23 Kosova Albanians who rescued Jews during the Holocaust.

== See also ==
- Albania–Israel relations
- History of the Jews in Albania
