= Albania–Israel relations =

- Albania: Israel

Diplomatic mission
- Albanian embassy, Tel Aviv: Israeli embassy, Tirana

Albania has recognized Israel as a state since April 19, 1949. Diplomatic relations between the countries were established on August 19, 1991. Albania has an embassy in Tel Aviv and Israel has an embassy in Tirana.

Albania was the only European country, formally aligned with the Axis powers during World War II, that emerged from World War II with a larger Jewish population than it had before the Holocaust. In 1999, Israel took in Kosovar Albanian refugees from the Kosovo War, providing them with medical care, food, and accommodations. In 2018, a monument dedicated to former Israeli President and Prime Minister Shimon Peres was erected in Tirana to honor his memory. Also in 2018, Albanian Ambassador to the UN Besiana Kadare of Muslim-majority Albania co-hosted an event at the United Nations with Jewish-majority Israel and Catholic-majority Italy, celebrating the translation of the Talmud into Italian for the first time.

In November 2019, after a deadly earthquake struck Albania, Israel sent Israel Defense Forces (IDF) military engineer troops to Albania to search through the rubble for survivors and rescue them, assess whether buildings were structurally sound, and provide Albanians who had been evacuated from their homes with waterproof tents to shelter them. In January 2020, Albanian President Ilir Meta met with Israel Defense Forces soldiers during an official visit in Israel, embraced them, thanked them for their assistance, and awarded them the Albanian Golden Medal of the Eagle.

== History ==
=== Early days ===
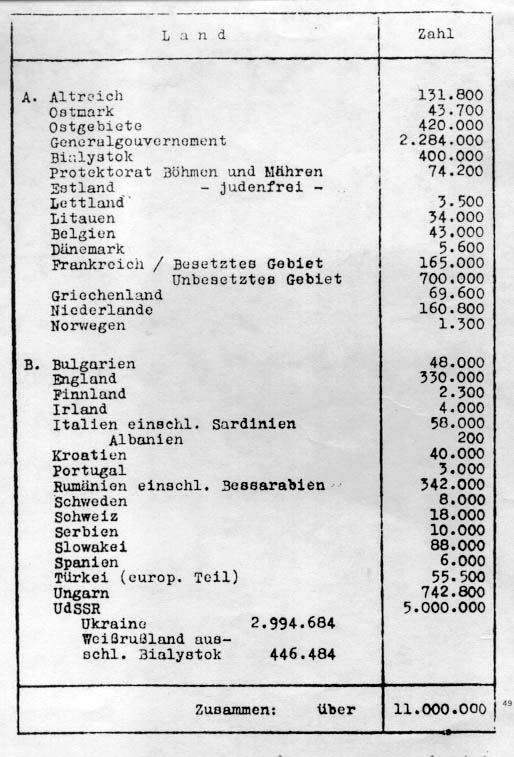
A list of European Jews compiled by the Nazis at the Wannsee Conference in January 1942. Albania is listed as having 200 Jews.

Albania was the only European country, of those occupied by the Axis powers of World War II, that emerged from World War II with a larger Jewish population than it had before the Holocaust. Its Jewish population rose from 200 before World War II, to more than 3,000 at the end of the war.

Not only did the Albanians protect their own Jews, but they provided refuge for Jews from neighboring countries. The Albanians refused to comply with the Nazis and hand over lists of Jews. Instead, they provided the Jewish families with forged documents, and helped them disperse in the Albanian population. Some 1,200 Jewish residents and refugees from other Balkan countries were hidden by Albanian families during World War II, according to official records.

In 2015, Israeli Prime Minister Benjamin Netanyahu said of Albania: "We never forget our friends, and we appreciate that display of humanity, civility, and courage in our darkest hours." Albanian Prime Minister Edi Rama said that Albania was "proud to have been a country where no Jew was released to the Nazis, and where there are incredible stories of Muslim families who protected Jewish families." In 2020, Albania unveiled a Holocaust memorial in the capital of Tirana to honor the dead and the Albanians who protected Jews from the Nazis, with an inscription written in three stone plaques in English, Hebrew, and Albanian that says “Albanians, Christians, and Muslims endangered their lives to protect and save the Jews.” Israeli Ambassador Noah Gal Gendler commented: "An excellent example from a small country which highlights the values of humanity, sacrifice, and love, values which still stand as fundamental in Albania."

=== Communist Albania (1946–1992) ===
Albania has recognized Israel as a state since April 19, 1949. During the Cold War (1947–1991), Albanian communist dictator Enver Hoxha had strained ties with Israel, due to his relationships with Arab states and his banning of all religions. On August 19, 1991, diplomatic relations between the two countries were established. Albania has an embassy in Tel Aviv, Israel, and Israel has an embassy in Tirana, Albania.

=== Contemporary Albania ===
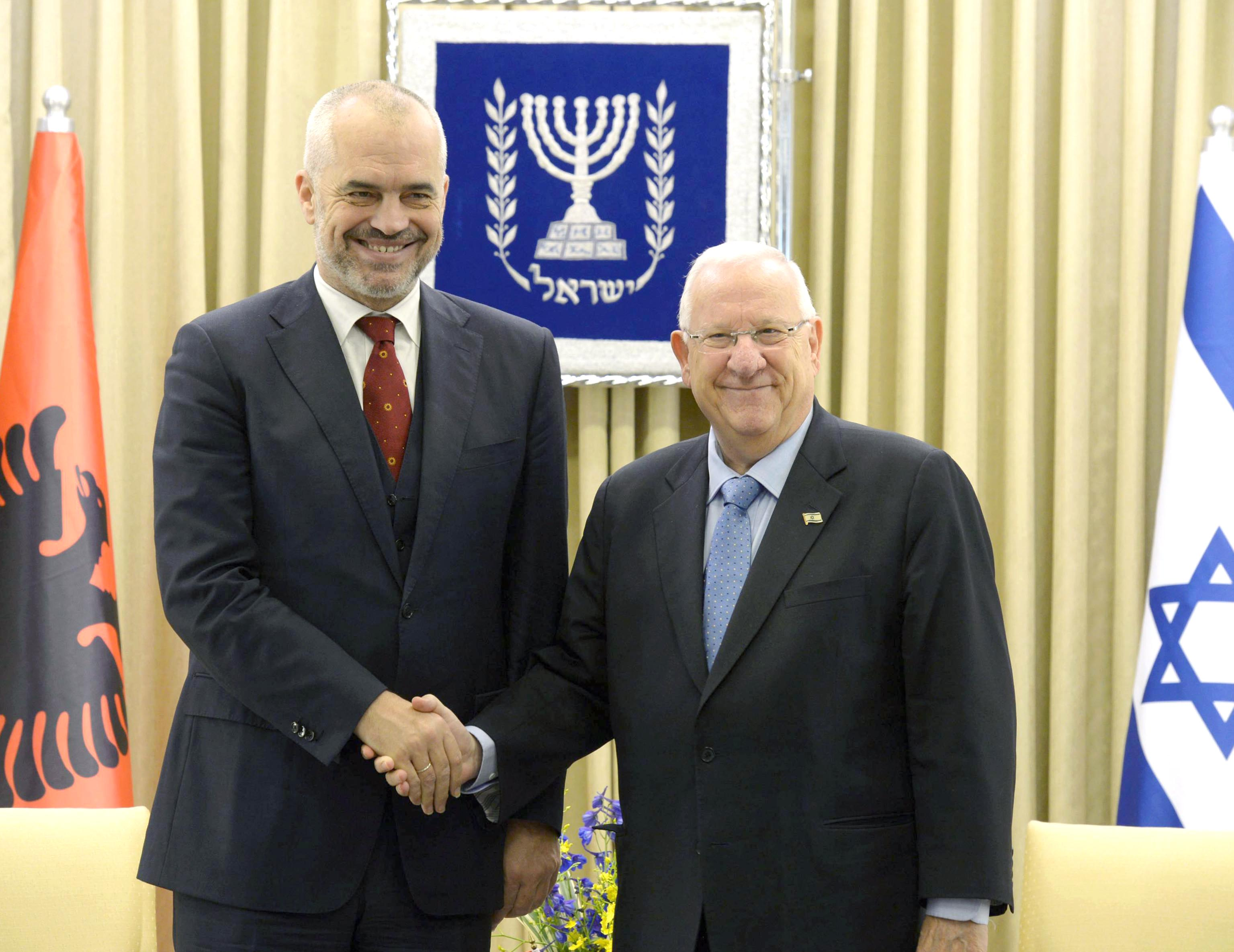
Albanian Prime Minister Edi Rama and Israeli President Reuven Rivlin

After the collapse of communism in Albania and the loosening of emigration restrictions, most of Albania's Jewish community emigrated in the 1990s to Israel, where in the early 21st century they number some 550 people. In 1994, Israeli then-Minister of Foreign Affairs Shimon Peres visited Albania.

In 1999, Israel took in Kosovar Albanian refugees from the Kosovo War, providing them with medical care, food, and accommodations.

In 2008, direct commercial flights began between the two countries. The countries also agreed to eliminate the need for tourist visas between them.

In 2011, Albanian Prime Minister Sali Berisha said: "Peace between Israel and the Palestinians must go through direct negotiations, and by guaranteeing the security of both states.... The solution must bring full security to both states, but I have not seen any support for the acceptance and recognition of the State of Israel."

In 2015, Israeli Prime Minister Benjamin Netanyahu and Albanian Prime Minister Edi Rama met in Israel and signed a joint declaration of friendship, a medical research cooperation agreement, and an agreement on the employment of diplomats' spouses. The two countries had established trade ties, and were working together on issues of security, investment, energy, and water, and discussing bilateral cooperation in cyber and innovation.

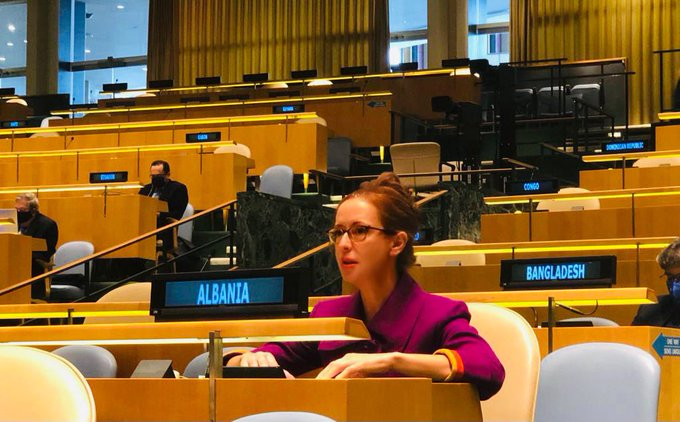
Albanian Ambassador to the United Nations Besiana Kadare

In 2018, Albanian Ambassador to the United Nations Besiana Kadare of Muslim-majority Albania co-hosted an event at the UN with Jewish-majority Israel and Catholic-majority Italy, celebrating the translation of the Talmud into Italian for the first time. Ambassador Kadare opined: “Projects like the Babylonian Talmud Translation open a new lane in intercultural and interfaith dialogue, bringing hope and understanding among people, the right tools to counter prejudice, stereotypical thinking and discrimination. By doing so, we think that we strengthen our social traditions, peace, stability — and we also counter violent extremist tendencies.”

Also in 2018, a monument dedicated to Israeli Prime Minister Shimon Peres was erected in Tirana to honor his memory, and the square in which it was placed was named for him. The monument is made of a Star of David-shaped stone, with the image of Peres engraved on it. Increasing numbers of Israelis travel to Albania, and in 2019 they amounted to 20,000 tourists.

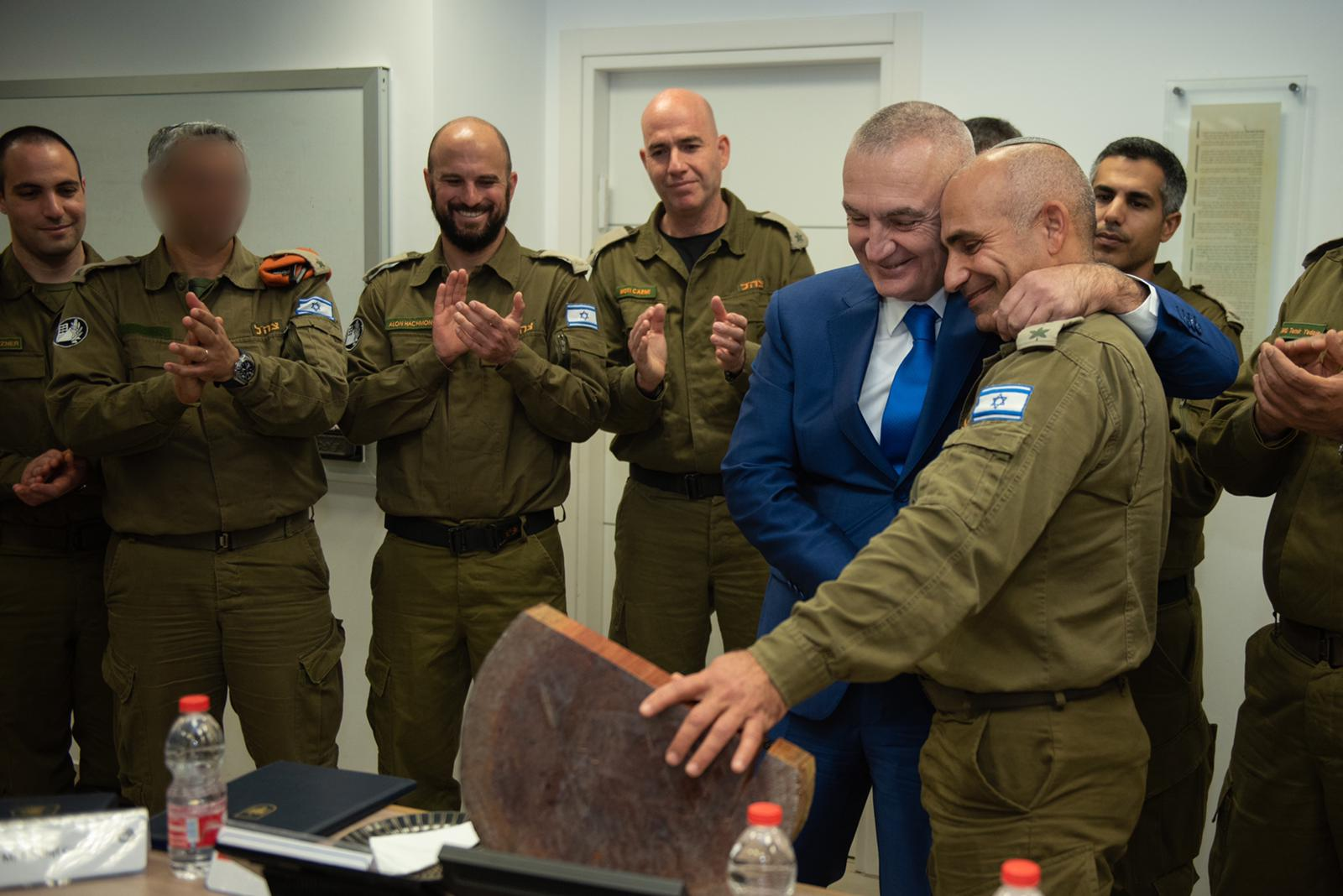
President Ilir Meta thanking IDF soldiers for their earthquake relief assistance

On 26 November 2019, an earthquake struck the Durrës region of Albania, killing 51 people, injuring 3,000 others, and damaging 11,000 buildings. Israel sent Israel Defense Forces (IDF) Home Front Command military engineer troops and a rescue and service team from the regional council of Mevo'ot HaHermon to Albania to search through the rubble for survivors and rescue them, assess whether buildings were structurally sound, and provide Albanians who had been evacuated from their homes with waterproof tents to shelter them. Israeli Foreign Minister Israel Katz wrote: "We stand with our Albanian friends during this difficult time, and will continue to assist them in any way we can." On 23 January 2020, Albanian President Ilir Meta met with Israel Defense Forces soldiers during an official visit in Israel, embraced them, and thanked them for their assistance in earthquake relief efforts and "further consolidating the friendly and historical relations between our two nations and our countries." At Ramla military base, Meta awarded the Golden Decoration of the Eagle to the National Rescue Unit of the IDF.

In 2020, Albania became the first Muslim-majority country to formally adopt the International Holocaust Remembrance Alliance’s definition of anti-Semitism and promise to fight anti-Jewish prejudice. The measure to adopt the definition was proposed by Socialist Party MP Taulant Balla, and accepted unanimously by the Parliament of Albania.

In September 2024, Israeli President Isaac Herzog visited Albania, becoming the first Israeli president to visit Albania.

=== Gallery ===
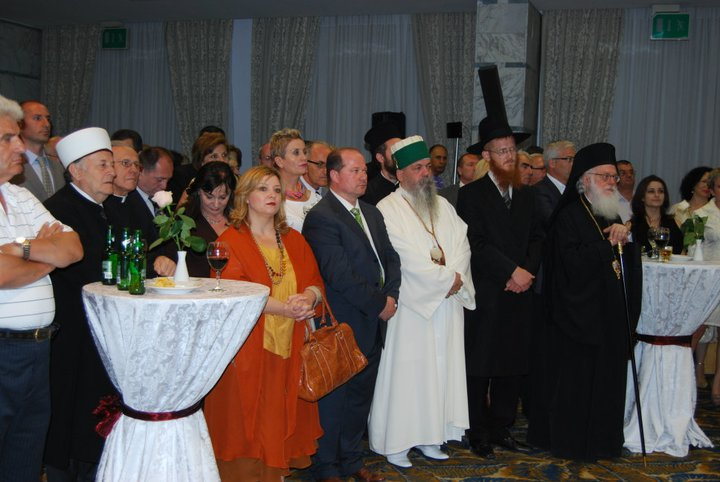
Marking Israel's 63rd anniversary in an Albanian synagogue in 2011

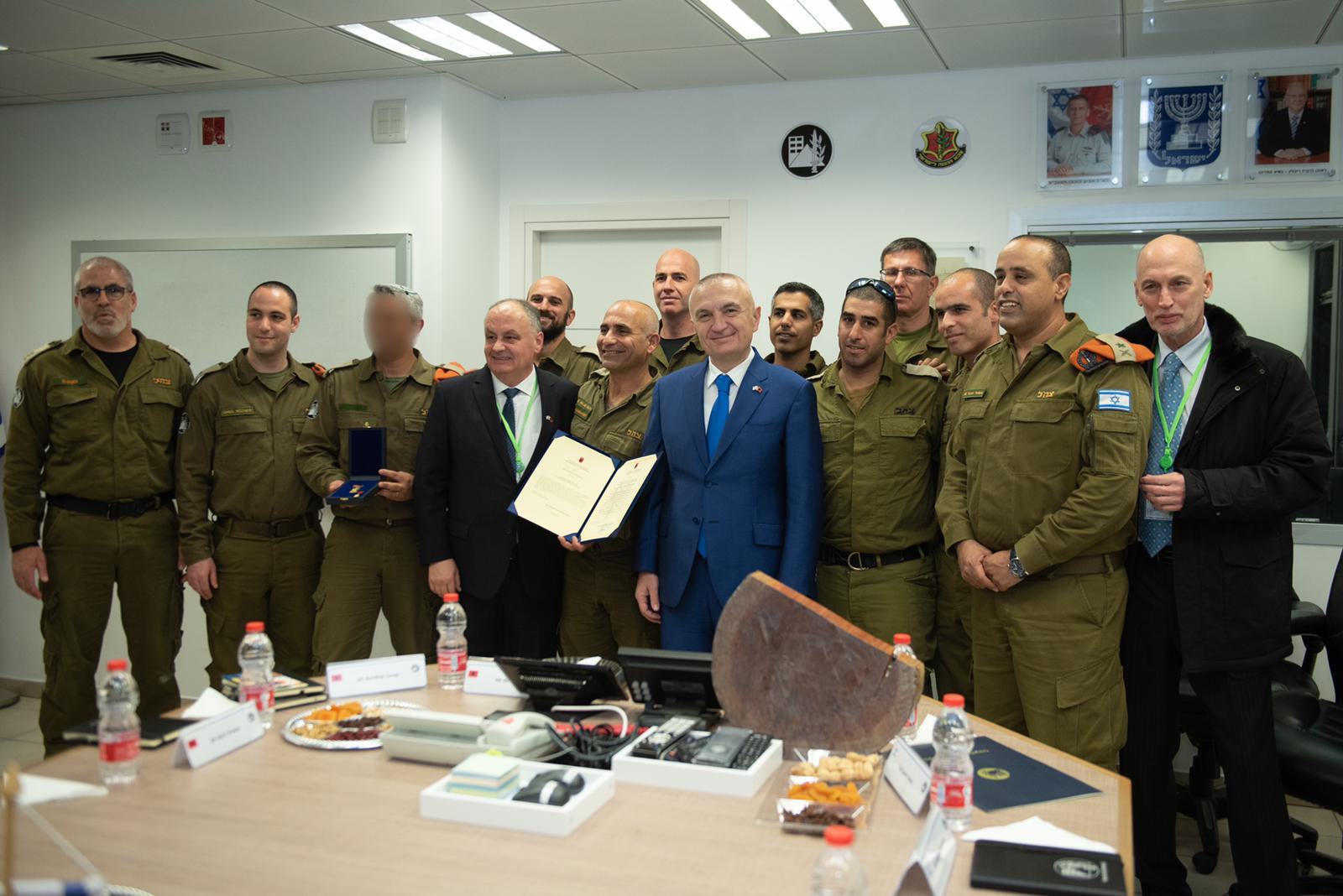
Albanian President Ilir Meta awarding the IDF National Rescue Unit the Golden Decoration of the Eagle

== Resident diplomatic missions ==
- Albania has an embassy in Tel Aviv.
- Israel has an embassy in Tirana.

== See also ==
- Albanians in Israel
- Foreign relations of Albania
- Foreign relations of Israel
- History of the Jews in Albania
- International recognition of Israel
- List of Albanian Righteous Among the Nations
- Israelization of Albania
