= Andinia Plan =

Patagonian Jewish state conspiracy theory

The Andinia Plan (Spanish: Plan Andinia) is an antisemitic conspiracy theory about an alleged Jewish plot to establish a Jewish state in Patagonia, a region spanning southern Argentina and Chile. The theory stems from the intentional distortion of historical Jewish agricultural migration to Argentina and discarded early-20th-century proposals for a Jewish homeland outside of Palestine, which conspiracists falsely reframe as evidence of an aggressive expansionist plot.

The conspiracy has been used in Argentina as a rhetorical device by far right circles to attack Jews and Jewish institutions. In 1971 a leaflet appeared among officers in the Argentinean army under the name "Plan Andinia," which accused international Jewry and Zionists of planning to take over southern Argentina.

== Historical origins and misuse ==
The "Andinia Plan" conspiracy theory relies on the retroactive distortion of late 19th and early 20th-century Jewish and Zionist history in Argentina. Conspiracists have misappropriated historical events, such as state-sanctioned agricultural migration, to falsely construct a narrative of clandestine territorial ambition.

In the late 19th century, the Argentine government, under the Roca administration, encouraged European immigration to facilitate national development. During this period, the Jewish Colonisation Association, sponsored by Maurice de Hirsch and Rabbi Zadoc Kahn, established agricultural settlements to support Jews fleeing persecution. While these projects were authorized by the Argentine state and focused on agrarian settlement, modern antisemitic narratives incorrectly characterize them as the initial stage of a "state-building" project.

The actual Jewish settlement effort in Argentina, largely centered in the Entre Ríos Province, integrated into the regional economy alongside other European immigrant groups. This history of legitimate settlement is frequently exploited by proponents of the Andinia theory to provide a veneer of historical "plausibility" to the claim that a modern, aggressive territorial conspiracy exists.

== Conspiracy theory ==
The extreme right-wing had a strong foothold in the Argentine military, mostly through the teachings of Jordán Bruno Genta. In these circles, the Andinia Plan was sometimes assumed to be a fact, even though the Zionist movement had abandoned all plans related to Argentina decades earlier, and Argentine Jewish institutions (headed by Delegación de Asociaciones Israelitas Argentinas) were recognized by (and conversant with) all Argentine governments, including military juntas.

Later versions of the Plan, as published in Argentine Neo-Nazi media in the 1970s by Walter Beveraggi Allende, involved an alleged Israeli plan to conquer parts of Patagonia in Argentina's south, and declare a Jewish state.

During the 1976–1983 dictatorship, some Jewish prisoners of the armed forces, notably Jacobo Timerman, were tortured for information about the Andinia plan, and were asked to provide details regarding the alleged preparations of the Israel Defense Forces for the invasion of Patagonia.

Timerman recalled details of the interrogation about the Plan Andinia – and his response to the absurdity of such a concept – in Preso Sin Nombre, Celda Sin Número (Prisoner without a Name, Cell without a Number).

=== 21st century ===
In the 21st century, conspiracy theorists have exploited the high volume of Israeli tourists in Patagonia to manufacture evidence for the plan. Following a 2011 accidental fire caused by an Israeli in Torres del Paine National Park, some local politicians and media figures falsely alleged a connection to the Andinia Plan, a claim condemned by the Anti-Defamation League. The 2026 Patagonia wildfires reignited the Andinia Plan conspiracy, with proponents falsely accusing Israeli tourists of intentionally starting the blazes.

== See also ==
- Judeopolonia, a similar antisemitic conspiracy theory regarding Poland
- Israelization of Albania
