= Walter Beveraggi Allende =

Argentinian politician and lawyer

Walter Beveraggi Allende (1 December 1920 – 1 April 1993) was an Argentinian politician, lawyer, and economist. He was known as a professor of Economics, and was openly antisemitic. Beveraggi Allende developed and promoted the conspiracy theory known as the Andinia Plan, which claimed that Jewish people intended to colonize the Patagonia region in order to establish a Jewish state and undermine the Argentinian nation. Despite lacking evidence, this theory continues to be believed by certain groups not only in Argentina but also in Chile and the diasporas of both countries.

In addition, he was a fierce opponent of Juan Domingo Perón, his political movement, and the presidents who later upheld his legacy. His opposition to Perón led to his exile and various political and legal troubles in Argentina.

== Biography ==
He was born in Buenos Aires, the son of Domingo Beveraggi, a medical doctor who went into exile in Montevideo, Uruguay due to his son's anti-Peronist activities, and later died there. Beveraggi Allende studied Law at the University of Buenos Aires, earning his degree in 1943. He joined the Labour Party in 1947 and became vice president of the party in October 1948. When Cipriano Reyes broke with Perón, both Reyes and Beveraggi Allende were incarcerated. Beveraggi claimed that he was tortured during his imprisonment, which fueled his strong opposition to Peronism.

After his release, he went into exile, first to Montevideo, and later to the United States, where he earned a PhD in Economics from Harvard University. He then began working as a professor at Boston University, where he became involved with other Argentinians who opposed Perón.

His anti-Peronist activism prompted the Argentine National Congress, at the initiative of the President, to strip him of his Argentinian citizenship in 1951 through a unique national law. This marked the first and only occasion in which an Argentinian citizen was formally deprived of their nationality. The main argument presented by Peronist lawmakers was that Beveraggi Allende was conspiring with then–U.S. Ambassador to Argentina Spruille Braden to stage a coup d'état against Perón.

When Perón was overthrown in 1955, the law was repealed, and Beveraggi Allende returned to Argentina. He resumed academic work, teaching Economics and Law at the University of Buenos Aires and the National University of Rosario.

He never concealed his strong opposition to Perón and his followers, including Carlos Menem, who wanted to be more conciliatory. In 1971, he began writing for the magazine Cabildo, where he published his theories about the Andinia Plan.
