= JewQ International Torah Championship =

International Jewish knowledge competition

JewQ (also called the International Jewish Knowledge Championship and International Torah Championship) is an annual contest in which part‑time Hebrew school pupils in grades 3–7 study a set Jewish‑knowledge syllabus and take written and quiz‑bowl exams. The programme was launched in 2018 by CKids International, a division of Merkos L'Inyonei Chinuch, and has since spread to communities on six continents.

== History ==
JewQ began in 2018 under CKids International, part of Merkos Suite 302 at Chabad-Lubavitch headquarters in Brooklyn. The first international final, held in March 2019 in Crown Heights, Brooklyn, drew regional champions from the United States and Canada.

In 2023 organisers reported 3,500 pupils from 235 schools, with 300 finalists meeting in Stamford, Connecticut. The following year JNS noted 4,000 participants from 250 communities and "hundreds of remote watch‑parties" worldwide.

The 2025 finals, hosted in New Jersey, featured 63 grade‑level champions drawn from roughly 4,000 contestants in 26 countries.

In 2026, 98 finalists from a field of about 4,500 students in 25 countries competed in the international final; Las Vegas third-grader Charlotte Henn won the third-grade division.

== Format ==
Contestants study grade‑specific handbooks covering prayers, Jewish holidays, biblical history and basic law. After three written tests, high scorers advance to regional quiz‑bowl events and an international final. The final round uses rapid‑fire questions, sometimes in team format, and crowns a winner for each grade.

== Organization and leadership ==
JewQ is organized by CKids (Chabad Kids) International, which is a division of Merkos Suite 302 (often referred to simply as Merkos 302). Merkos 302 operates under Merkos L'Inyonei Chinuch, the central educational branch of Chabad-Lubavitch headquartered in Brooklyn, New York. The competition is one of CKids' flagship programs and aligns with Chabad's outreach goals of providing enriching Jewish experiences to children outside of the day-school system. Rabbi Mendy Kotlarsky, executive director of Merkos 302 and key figure at Chabad Headquarters, oversees CKids International and has been central to JewQ's expansion.

== Reception ==
JewQ has attracted coverage in regional and national news outlets, underscoring both its educational reach and community impact. In February 2025, the Long Island Press detailed a Port Washington regional contest, highlighting how local schools prepared students for the international finals. The South Florida Sun Sentinel published a profile of a Boynton Beach fifth-grader who earned the title of Torah World Champion in April 2025, and the Jewish Exponent covered a Gladwyne, Pennsylvania student's victory that same month. In April 2025, Main Line Media News reported on a Lower Merion champion, and the Baltimore Jewish Times featured an international finalist from Maryland in April 2025.
