= Israelization of Albania =

Antisemitic conspiracy theory originating in Albania

The Israelization of Albania (Albanian: Izraelizimi i Shqipërisë) is an antisemitic conspiracy theory originating in Albania. The theory alleges that organizations or individuals affiliated with the Zionist movement are seeking to establish a Jewish state in Albania, and that resorts in Sazan, Zvërnec, Rrjoll and elsewhere are being created to establish Jewish settlements.

The theory has been promoted by prominent Albanian conspiracy theorists such as Alfred Cako, Zaçe Islami, and Altin Goxhaj.

== History and background ==
In 1935, a British Zionist journalist named Leo Elton visited Albania. Elton was impressed by the country's religious tolerance, lack of antisemitism and fertile land. Due to these factors he proposed the creation of a Jewish state in Albania, but ultimately this proposal never materialized.

=== Sazan Island Resort ===
The Sazan Island Resort is a highly controversial, proposed €1.4 billion luxury eco-resort development on Sazan Island, Albania. Spearheaded by Jared Kushner's investment firm, Affinity Partners, alongside his wife Ivanka Trump, the mega-project aims to transform a decommissioned Cold War communist military base into a high-end tourist destination featuring luxury villas, hotels, and a marina.

The proposal has caused significant resistance and opposition in Albania, escalating into large anti-government protests, known as the Flamingo Revolution. While starting as a movement against the construction of the resort, the movement has evolved into protests against the Albanian political class.

== Conspiracy theory ==
In February 2026, during an appearance on the television program E Diell following Prime Minister Edi Rama's visit to Israel, conspiracy theorist Alfred Cako claimed that Jews were attempting to build a "new Khazaria" in Albania. He accused Rama of collaborating with "Jewish advisors" to drive Albanians out of the country.

The theory began to gain attention in May 2026, primarily through social media. A video spread on TikTok with an image showing a fence in Zvërnec with the Albanian flag on one side, and the Israeli flag on the other. This picture was later revealed to be AI-generated. In a speech held in Berat, PM Edi Rama condemned the disinformation and claimed that "...they're [the protesters] falling prey to some pseudo-Muslims spreading the legend that Zvërnec has been sold to Israel".

The theory began to spread even more due to remarks made by Dr. Anna Cohen, a Jewish-Albanian dentist. In an interview, Cohen claimed that in 1492, Vlora had a 90% Jewish population and a 10% Albanian population. This statement drew significant backlash from many Albanians.

In April 2026, former CIA agent and whistleblower John Kiriakou stated that "Israelis are buying up land in Albania, Greece and Cyprus", and that "this was a plan to create a safe haven if things got worse". In August 2026 false claims that Edi Rama would give citizenship to 100 thousand Israelis emerged.

Social media users falsely claimed that the host of an Airbnb in Vlorë discovered that his guests were IDF soldiers and that he evicted them from the apartment, and that the group of tourists set fire to the apartment subsequently.

== See also ==
- Antisemitism
- Andinia Plan
- Judeopolonia
- History of the Jews in Albania
- Flamingo Revolution
