= History of the Jews in Kosovo =

Kosovar Jews
Hebrenjtë kosovarë Косовски Јевреји
- The location of Kosovo in Europe

Total population
- ~50

Regions with significant populations
- Pristina

Languages
- Serbian, Albanian, Ladino, Turkish

Religion
- Judaism

Related ethnic groups
- Jews (Serbian Jews, Albanian Jews)

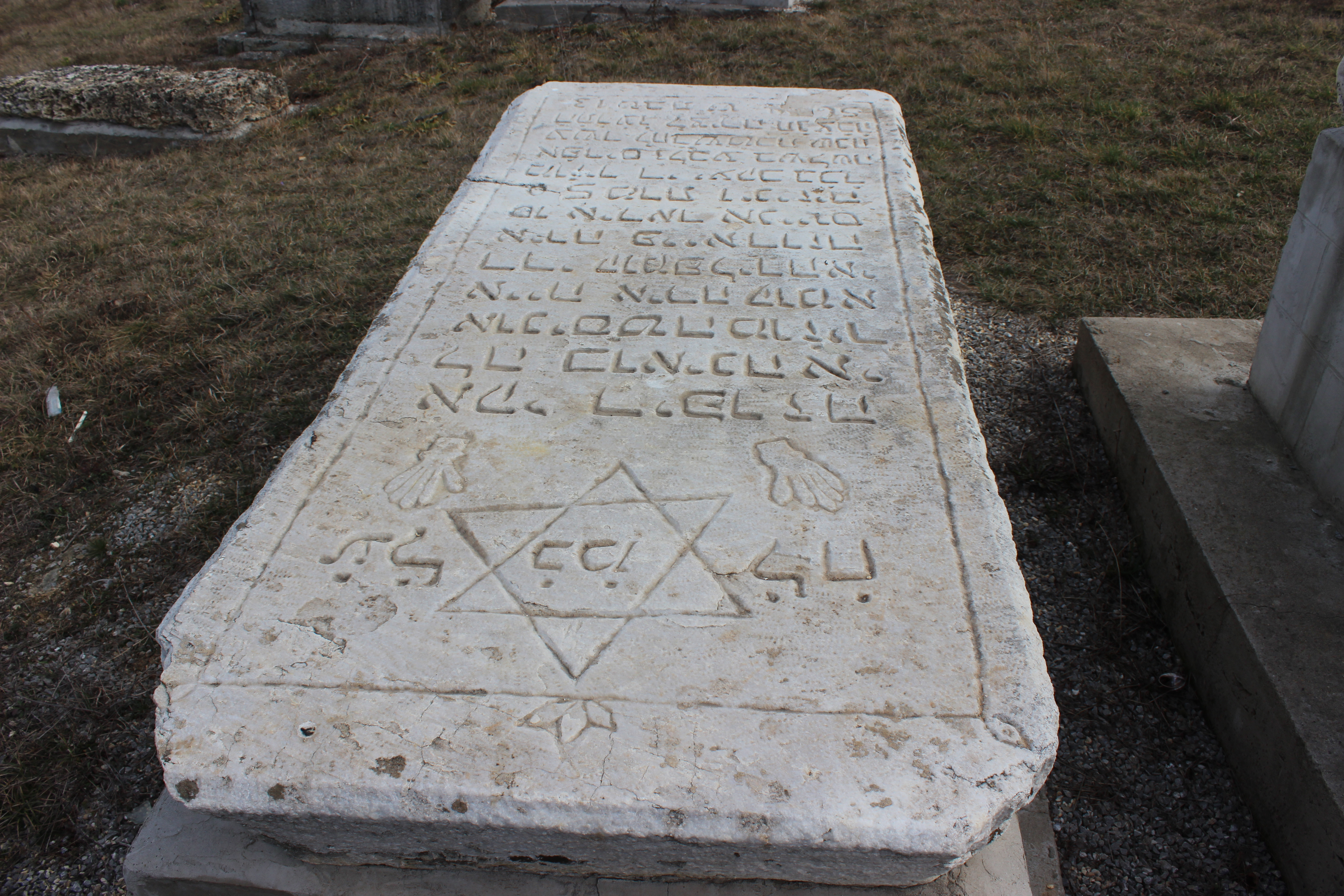
Jewish tombstone in Pristina

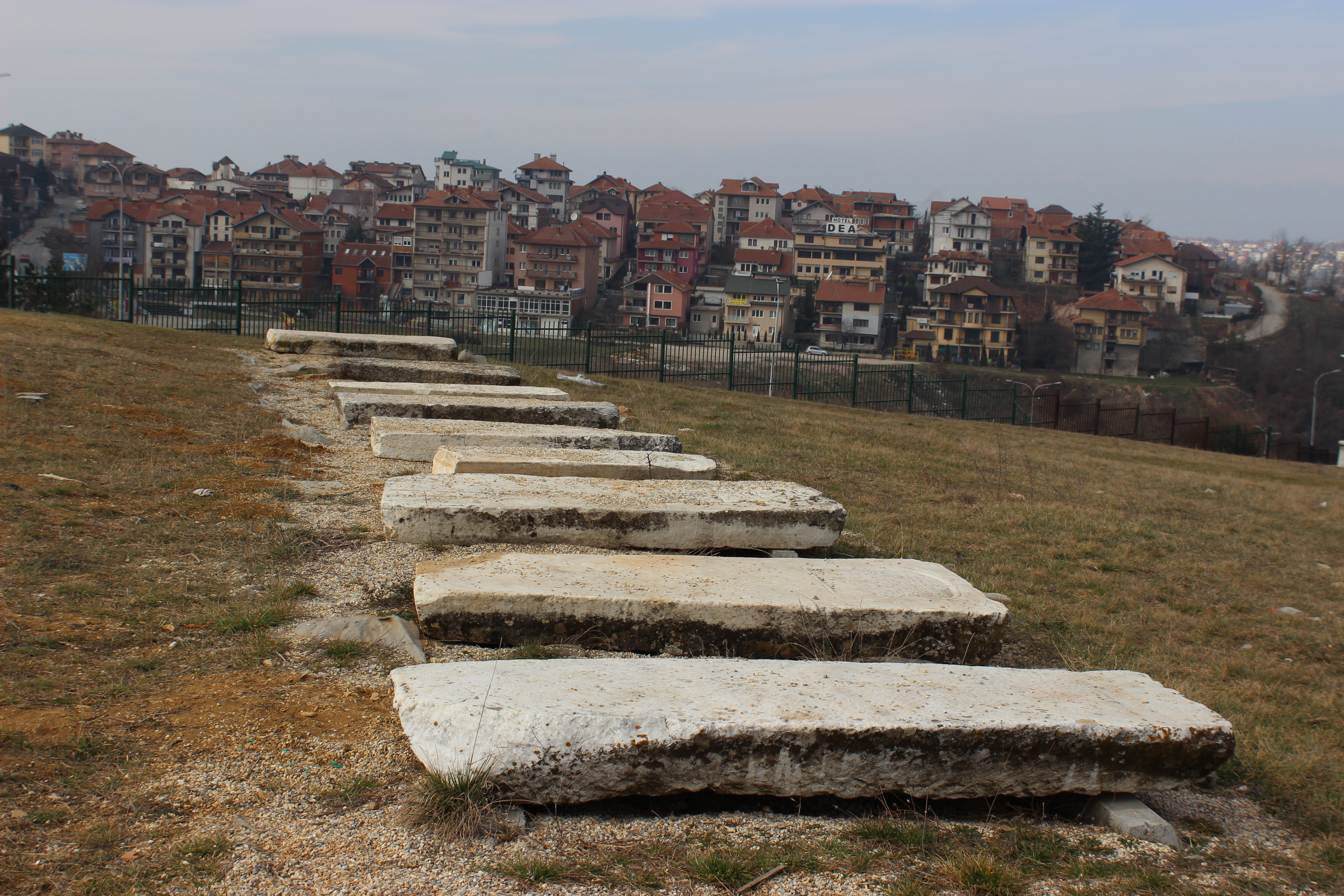
Jewish cemetery in Pristina

The history of the Jews in Kosovo largely mirrors that of the history of the Jews in Serbia, except during the Second World War, when Kosovo, as part of Kingdom of Albania, was under Italian control and later under German control. The other exception is following the Kosovo War of 1999, when the province began its political separation from Serbia.

== Ottoman rule ==
Prior to the Ottoman Turkish conquest of the region, documentation on the Jews of the Balkans was sketchy. The Jewish communities of the Balkans were boosted in the 15th and 16th centuries by the arrival of Jewish refugees fleeing the Spanish and Portuguese Inquisitions. Sultan Bayezid II of the Ottoman Empire welcomed the Jewish refugees into his empire. Jews became involved in trade between the various provinces in the Ottoman Empire, becoming especially important in the salt trade.

The 1455 Turkish cadastral tax census^{a} of the Branković lands (covering 80% of present-day Kosovo) recorded 1 Jewish dwelling in Vushtrri.

An Austrian statistic published in 1899 estimated:

- Albanians: (48%)
- Serbs: (44%)
- Remaining 8%: Tsintsars, Turks, Circassians, Romani, and Jews

== Yugoslavian rule ==
In the aftermath of World War I, Serbia merged with Montenegro, and then united with the State of Slovenes, Croats and Serbs to form the Kingdom of Serbs, Croats and Slovenes, which was soon renamed Kingdom of Yugoslavia. The largely Albanian-populated Kosovo was included within Serbia. At the time, some 500 Jews resided in Kosovo.

The 1921 population census for the territories comprising modern-day Kosovo listed 439,010 inhabitants:

By religion:

- Muslims: 329,502 (75%)
- Serbian Orthodox: 93,203
- Roman Catholics: 15,785
- Jews: 427
- Greek Catholics: 26

== World War II and The Holocaust ==
In 1941, Kosovo was incorporated into the Italian-ruled Greater Albania. In July 1943, when Italy left the war, the Germans took control of Kosovo. In 1944, communist partisans recaptured Kosovo from Albania and made it part of the Democratic Federal Yugoslavia.

=== Deportations and death / survival figures ===
Current literature indicates five sets of numerically recorded deportations from Kosovo:

1) August 1941, Mitrovica, under German occupation, 88 Jews are reported to have been sent to Sajmište Concentration Camp near axis occupied Belgrade where they were killed. Prior to deportation all Jewish men in Mitrovica / Mitrovice are alleged to have been arrested, while women were sent to daily forced labor. In February 1942, the women are said to have been detained with their children, Jewish property taken by local collaborators, and the synagogue destroyed. A 1960 report to the Administration of the State Security of NR Serbia details names of victims from 12 families shot at the camp in winter 1941.

[Source can be crossed referenced with second generational verbal accounts of deportations from Mitrovica that can still be sourced today. Supplementary survivor testimony in the Shoah Foundation Archive also makes reference to experience of the holocaust in relation to movements through Kosovska Mitrovica]

2) 1942, Prishtina. 250 Yugoslavian Jews, including an unknown number of native Kosovo Jews, transferred to the Albanian interior. As of 1943 historian Daniel Perez relates they made up part of 500 Jews held under house arrest or in concentration camps in the Albanian towns of Berat, Kruja and Kavaja. He also indicates movements of both native and non-native Jews from Kosovo to Albania were ongoing throughout the war period.

3) March 1942, Prishtina. Italian military police detained 51 Jewish refugees and passed them to the Nazis. According to historian Noel Malcolm they were sent to Sajmiste. Daniel Perez details that the deportation list was compiled by Italian authorities and local Albanian police and that they were first sent to a "concentration camp" [probable terminiological error - as it was a holding camp] in Prishtina before being transferred to Mitrovica.

4) May 14, 1944, Prishtina. Nazi Chief Heinrich Himmler organized the Skanderburg Unit which were commanded by the Germans to arrest 281 Jews who were sent to Bergen-Belsen via occupied Belgrade where, according to Noel Malcolm, 'more than' 200 died, or according to Martin Cüppers, 'at least' 177 died.

5) August 1944, Prishtina, An extensive list of 789 mainly non-Jewish victims including Bosniak, Albanian, Serbian, communists, partisans and activists, arrested by the SS Skanderburg division to be transported to the Reich has been published by Robert Elise. 31 people are listed as Jews, and a further 11 people, mainly children, are listed purely on the basis of belonging to a Jewish family. Their fate is unknown.

Though the majority of historians seem to draw consensus around the 281 figure Albanian historian Haxhi Bajraktari is said to have written that only 43 Jewish names were included in a total of 249 deportees, whom he describes as mainly Communists and Partisans. Analysis of apparently original Nazi transport lists suggest Bajraktari's apparent figures for Jews to be understated. Serbian historian Pavle Dzeletovic Ivanov also puts the number of arrests on May 14 at 400 (which conversely suggests overstatement). The names of those who both survived and perished at Bergen-Belsen are recorded at source

Noel Malcolm summarises that out of 551 native Kosovo Jews present before war, 210 had died by the end. This does not correspond numerically with the full evidence above. The true number therefore remains unknown.

Video interviews with Kosovo Jews who survived the Holocaust can be found at the Shoah Foundation.

Extensive testimonies and photographs can be found at the USA Holocaust Museum website.

=== Extracts from witness statements ===
An extract from the statement of Hedviga Schönfein, prisoner of the Judenlager Zemlin (Sajmište) prison camp has been published by the Centre for Democracy and Reconciliation in South East Europe:

"Immediately upon our arrival at the camp, the Germans told us that the camp would gradually be evacuated, because they intended to imprison communists at the Fair, but they did not want to tell us where they were going to take us.... For the first transfers they invited volunteers and the first to be invited was the group I was from – Jews from Kosmet. (...) Those who were designated for transport were ordered, or, more precisely, kindly advised to take their most valuable possessions with them, and to pack all the rest carefully and put their exact address on the package. (...) Thus, these transfers departed almost every day. On Sundays and holidays there were usually no transfers or removals, but there were days when the car would make two rounds. The driver of the grey car often entered the camp alone, gathered children around him, caressed them, took them in his arms and gave them candies. The children liked him and whenever he came, they would rush toward him to get candies. No one in the camp suspected that people were taken to their deaths. It was strongly believed they were being transferred into a work camp."

A statement from Albert Ruben suggests a deportation from Prishtina in winter 1943, not recorded by the academic historians above:

"At the end of 1943, it was already winter, maybe November or December, the SS men came to all Jewish homes to round us up. They got us out of our beds and took us straight to the barracks near the football field. There were a lot of us, more than four hundred people. We stayed there for two days. Everyone brought some food with them. We didn't have a toilet, so we dug a hole and put some wooden boards over it. They were threatening us, telling us to hand over our gold and other valuables, and we were throwing them into the toilet. What we had not given to the poor earlier we were now throwing into the toilet. Before long they put us into cattle wagons and drove us to the Belgrade camp for Jews at the Sajmiste."

=== Further sources of information on WWII and Holocaust period ===
Extensive information on the German occupation of Albania proper, with original Nazi source materials referring to Kosovo, can be found in the work of Robert Elise.

A thorough critique of the teaching of the subject of WWII and the holocaust in Kosovo schools has been produced by Oral History Kosovo.

== Post-war community ==
The Federation of Jewish Communities in Yugoslavia was formed in the aftermath of World War II to coordinate the Jewish communities of post-war Yugoslavia and to lobby for the right of Jews to immigrate to Israel. The Federation was headquartered in Belgrade, the capital of the post-war Yugoslavia.

More than half of the surviving Yugoslav Jews chose to immigrate to Israel after World War II. The Jewish community of Serbia, and indeed of all constituent republics in Yugoslavia, was maintained by the unifying power of the Federation of Jewish Communities in Yugoslavia. However, this power ended with the dissolution of Yugoslavia in the 1990s.

== Yugoslav wars ==
The Jews of Serbia lived relatively peacefully in Yugoslavia between World War II and the 1990s. According to the 1991 census, there were 112 Jews in Kosovo, though it is possible that there have been more. However, the end of the Cold War saw the breakup of Yugoslavia, and wars in Croatia and Bosnia and Herzegovina. The war for Kosovo began in the 1990s, when Serbian leader Slobodan Milošević began consolidating power in Kosovo and the Kosovo Liberation Army waged a separatist insurgency. In 1999, international forces expelled Serbian forces from Kosovo. During the conflict, the 50 remaining Jews in the provincial capital city of Pristina fled to Albania, because they had close cultural and linguistic ties with Albanians.

== Post-war Kosovo ==
Currently there are very few Jews in Kosovo, according to Čeda Prlinčević, the leader of Pristina's small Jewish community.

The lone Jewish community in Prizren speaks Albanian and Turkish, and has remained for the time being. This community numbers around 50 members, divided among three families. Unemployment is prevalent, and support for the community comes from the American Jewish Joint Distribution Committee. There has been some amount of intermarriage with the surrounding Albanian community. The father of Votim Demiri, Prizren's Jewish community leader, is Albanian. Israel has good relations with the Kosovar Government, with the Israeli government sending some humanitarian aid during the war in 1999. As of 2020 Israel has recognized Kosovo's independence and Kosovo will move its embassy to Jerusalem.

Kosovo has adopted the International Holocaust Remembrance Alliance's Working Definition of Antisemitism to support international efforts in combating antisemitism.

== See also ==
- The Holocaust in German-occupied Serbia
- Israel–Kosovo relations

== Notes and references ==
Notes:

a.	The original Turkish-language copy of the census is stored in Istanbul's archives. However, in 1972 the Sarajevo Institute of Middle Eastern Studies translated the census and published an analysis of it Kovačević Mr. Ešref, Handžić A., Hadžibegović H. Oblast Brankovića - Opširni katastarski popis iz 1455., Orijentalni institut, Sarajevo 1972. Subsequently, others have covered the subject as well such as Vukanović Tatomir, Srbi na Kosovu, Vranje, 1986.
