= Besa (Albanian culture) =

Albanian concept of faith, honor, and keeping one's word

Besa (indefinite form: besë) is an Albanian cultural precept, usually translated as 'pledge of honor', 'solemn faith', 'solemn oath', 'to keep the promise' or 'word of honor', regarded as something sacred and inviolable. Besa is of prime importance as a cornerstone of personal and social conduct in the Albanian traditional customary law (Kanun), which has directed all the aspects of Albanian tribal society.

The Albanian adjective besnik, derived from besa, means 'faithful' or 'trustworthy'. Besnik for men and Besa for women continue to be popular names among Albanians.

== Etymology ==
The Albanian word besa is an Indo-European cognate and shares similarities with the Classical Latin word fides. In Late Antiquity and the Medieval period, Latin fides took on the Christian meaning of 'faith' or '(religious) belief', a sense that persists in modern Romance languages and was borrowed into Albanian as feja. Originally, however, fides had an ethical and juridical meaning and was personified as the Roman goddess Fides.

The Albanian term besa was borrowed into Greek as μπέσα (bésa), with the same meaning 'word of honor'.

== Cultural concept and institution ==
An Albanian who says besa once cannot in any way break [his] promise and cannot be unfaithful [to it].

— Mehmed Ferid Pasha, Ottoman-Albanian grand vizier, (1903)

Besa is a word in the Albanian language meaning 'pledge of honor'. The concept is based upon faithfulness toward one's word in the form of loyalty or as an allegiance guarantee. Besa contains mores toward obligations to the family and a friend, the demand to have internal commitment, loyalty and solidarity when conducting oneself with others and secrecy in relation to outsiders. The besa is also the main element within the concept of the ancestor's will or pledge (amanet) where a demand for faithfulness to a cause is expected in situations that relate to unity, national liberation and independence that transcend a person and generations.

The concept of besa is included in the Kanun, the customary law of the Albanian people. The besa was an important institution within the tribal society of the Albanian Malisors (highlanders). Albanian tribes swore oaths to jointly fight against the government and in this aspect the besa served to uphold tribal autonomy. The besa was used toward regulating tribal affairs between and within the Albanian tribes. The Ottoman government used the besa as a way to co-opt Albanian tribes in supporting state polices or to seal agreements.

During the Ottoman period, the besa would be cited in government reports regarding Albanian unrest, especially in relation to the tribes. The besa formed a central place within Albanian society in relation to generating military and political power. Besa held Albanians together, united them and would wane when the will to enforce them dissipated. In times of revolt against the Ottomans by Albanians, the besa functioned as a link among different groups and tribes.

== History ==
In the Statutes of Scutari, according to Ardian Klosi and Ardian Vehbiu, the verb bessare ('to make an oath') is the first documentation of this concept. Afterwards in the missal translated by Gjon Buzuku, it is used as faith (Latin: fides) "O gruo, e madhe äshte besa jote" (Latin: O mulier, magna est fides tua; Gospel of Matthew 15:28). In the early 19th century, Markos Botsaris, in his Greek-Albanian dictionary, translated the Albanian besa (written μπέσα) as the Greek θρησκεία (thriskeía), meaning 'religion', or, by extension, 'faith'. In 1896, the Ottoman government provincial almanac for Kosovo titled Kosova Salnamesi had a two-page entry on besa and compared it to the French concept of parole d'honneur ('word of honor').

=== Late Ottoman period ===
During the Great Eastern Crisis, Albanians gathered in Prizren, Kosovo (1878) and made a besa to form a political alliance (League of Prizren) aimed at upholding Ottoman territorial integrity to prevent the partition of Albanian lands by neighbouring Balkan countries. In 1881 Albanians swore a besa and rebelled against the Ottoman government. Abdul Hamid II opposed blood feuds of the Albanian tribes and issued (1892–1893) a proclamation to the people of the Ișkodra (Shkodër) area urging them to make a besa and reject the practice, in the hope that the very institution (besa) that upheld the vendetta could be used against it.

In 1907, the empire sent a military inspection commission to Kosovo and one of its fact finding objectives was concerned with the prevention of a "general besa" against the Ottoman government. During the Young Turk Revolution of July 1908, Kosovo Albanians that gathered at Firzovik (Ferizaj) agreed to a besa toward pressuring sultan Abdul Hamid II to restore constitutional government. In November 1908, during the Congress of Manastir on the Albanian alphabet question, delegates selected a committee of eleven that swore a besa promising that nothing would be revealed before a final decision and in keeping with that oath agreed to two alphabets as the step forward. During the Albanian revolt of 1910, Kosovo Albanian chieftains gathered at Firzovik and swore a besa to fight the centralist polices of the Ottoman Young Turk government. In the Albanian revolt of 1912, Albanians pledged a besa against the Young Turk government which they had assisted into gaining power in 1908. Haxhi Zeka, a landowner from Ipek (Pejë) organized a meeting of 450 Kosovo Albanian notables in 1899 and they agreed to form a besa (League of Peja) to fight the Ottoman government and swore a besa to suspend all blood feuding.

=== World War II ===
During World War II under German occupation, Albanians rescued and hid over 2,000 Jews from Nazi persecution, motivated in part by the cultural institution of besa that emphasises aiding and protecting people in moments of need.

=== Modern period ===
In Montenegro, an event Beslidhja e Malësisë ('Pledge of the Highlands') took place in Tuzi (28 June 1970) in the presence of Catholic and Muslim clergy. Families and other extended kin in the Malesia region made a besa and agreed to cease blood feuding and accept state judicial outcomes for victims and perpetrators.

== Cultural references ==
=== Sayings ===
Besa-related sayings include:

- Besa e shqiptarit nuk shitet pazarit. – 'The besa of the Albanian is not for sale.'
- Shqiptarët vdesin dhe Besën nuk e shkelin. – 'Albanians would die before they violate besa.'
- Besa e shqiptarit si purteka e arit. – 'The besa of the Albanian is worth more than gold.'

=== Literature, arts and politics ===
In 1874 Sami Frashëri wrote a play Besâ yâhut Âhde Vefâ ('Pledge of Honor or Loyalty to an Oath') with themes based on an Albanian ethnicity, a bond to an ethnic based territory, ethnocultural diversity as underlying Ottoman unity, honor, loyalty and self-sacrifice. The play revolved around a betrothed girl kidnapped by a jealous villager that kills her father and whose mother vows revenge co-opting the culprit's father who gives his besa to help not knowing it is his son, later killing him and himself ending with family reconciliation. At the time the play's discussion of besa signified to more astute Ottoman audiences the political implications of the concept and possible subversive connotations in future usage while it assisted Albanians in rallying militarily and politically around a national program. By the early twentieth century, the themes of the play highlighting a besa for self-sacrifice of the homeland carried a subversive message for Albanians to aim at unifying the nation and defend the homeland, something Ottoman authorities viewed as fostering nationalist sentiments.

Frashëri wrote a political treatise Albania: What She Has Been, What She Is, What She Shall Be (1899) on the Albanian question and proposed that Albanians make a besa to demand the empire and Europe recognize Albanian national rights, especially by applying pressure upon the Ottomans to achieve those aims.

Besa is a key theme in the novel Kush e solli Doruntinën (usually abbreviated in English to Doruntine) (1980), by Albanian novelist Ismail Kadare.

In the 1980s until 1994, a bimonthly newspaper named Besa was published by the Arvanite community of Greece.

In the 2010s, the cultural institution of besa featured in an international exhibition named Besa: A Code of Honor by photographer Norman H. Gershman and in an award-winning documentary film Besa: The Promise on the survival of Jews in Albania during the Holocaust.

In 2015, an Albanian political party named Lëvizja Besa ('Besa Movement') with an anti-establishment and anti-corruption platform was founded in the Republic of North Macedonia.

== See also ==
- Albanian folklore
- Kanun
- Pashtunwali
- Solemn Promise
