= Djákninn á Myrká =

Icelandic folk tale

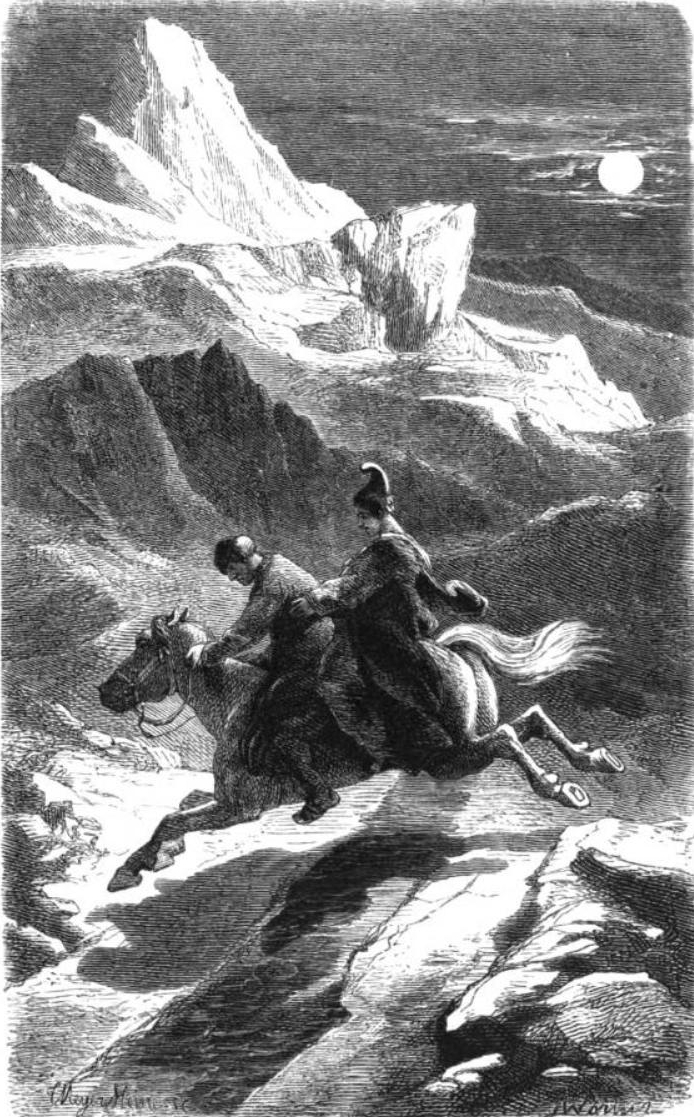
- An engraving depicting "The Deacon of Dark River" from an 1864 publication.

Folk tale
- Name: Djákninn á Myrká
- Also known as: The Deacon of the Dark River; The Deacon of Myrká
- Aarne–Thompson grouping: ATU 365 (The Dead Bridegroom carries off his Bride); ATU 365 (The Specter Bridegroom)
- Region: Iceland
- Published in: Isländische Volkssagen der Gegenwart (1860), by Konrad Maurer
- Related: Lenore (ballad); Sweet William's Ghost

Djákninn á Myrká (English: The Deacon of Dark River, The Deacon of Myrká) is an Icelandic folk tale. The setting of the tale is Myrká, in Eyjafjörður, located in Iceland.

== Legend ==
A deacon who lived on a farm called Myrká (Dark River) had a girlfriend named Guðrún. She lived on farm called Bægisá located on the other side of a big river called Hörgá. One day the deacon rode his horse Faxi to Bægisá to meet Guðrún so they could discuss their plans for Christmas. The deacon promised to ride to Bægisá on Christmas Eve and bring Guðrún to Myrká where they could celebrate the holiday together. But on his way back home that day, the deacon was unexpectedly caught in a heavy storm. He fell into the Hörgá river where he suffered a severe head injury and drowned.

The deacon's body was found the next day by a farmer and buried a week before Christmas. But the news of his death somehow had not reached Guðrún. On Christmas Eve, as per their arrangement, the deacon arrived at her farm. She had barely finished dressing, and only had time to put on one sleeve of her coat before they were off on their journey. As they rode, his face was hidden by a hat and scarf, but when they came to Hörgá river the horse tripped and the deacons hat fell forward. Guðrún saw his terrible head injury. As the moon shined upon them he said, “The moon fades, death rides. Don't you see a white spot on the back of my head, Garún, Garún?“ She replied, “I see, what is“. After that, they did not speak a word until they came to the deacon's farm Myrká. When they got off the horse, the deacon spoke again. “Wait here Garún, Garún. While I move Faxi, Faxi (the deacon's horse) over the fence, fence”. (In Icelandic folklore, ghosts often speak in verse, repeating the last word of each line.)

When Guðrún noticed an open grave in the graveyard, she felt the deacon trying to pull her into it. By luck, she was only wearing one sleeve of her coat. Then the deacon pulled on her empty sleeve. At that time, Guðrún had her other hand on the bell-string outside the church. She pulled it with all her might, ringing the bell, and did not stop pulling until people came out to see what all the noise was about. Her coat ripped into two parts and the deacon disappeared into his grave with one half of Guðrún's coat in his hand. As he went into his grave and the grave filled up, she realized that the deacon was dead and she'd encountered his ghost. Guðrún was haunted by the deacon's ghost throughout the night, the disturbance causing others residing at the farm to lose sleep. An exorcist was summoned who finally put the deacon's ghost to rest.

== Characters ==
- The Deacon of Dark River – The main character dating Guðrún in the story
- Guðrún – The co-star of the story
- Guðrúns mom – Opens the door when the deacon knocks on the door for Guðrún
- The farmer in Dark River – the man who finds the deacon's body
- Faxi – The deacon's horse

== About the story ==
The folk tale about The Deacon of Dark River is very well known and popular in Iceland, possibly because ghost tales and ghost stories in general are very popular in the Icelandic community. The story takes place in the north of Iceland, and like most folktales, its origins and author are unknown.

It is notable that when the deceased deacon picks up Guðrún for Christmas Eve, he keeps calling her Garún. This is because the first part of the name Guðrún — “ Guð “ — is the Icelandic word for God, and in Icelandic legend, ghosts can't say the words God or angel.

== Publication ==
"Djákninn á myrká" first appeared in print in Konrad Maurer's collection of Icelandic folk tales Isländische Volkssagen der Gegenwart in 1860. Its first publication in Icelandic was in Jón Árnason's and Magnús Grímsson's Íslenzkar þjóðsögur og æfintýri in 1862, whereas the book was translated into English with the name Icelandic Legends. The tale also reprinted in German language with the title Die Küster von Mörkaa. The tale was also translated to English as The Deacon of Myrká and The Deacon of Darkwater.

== Analysis ==
=== Tale type ===
The folk tale is classified as Aarne–Thompson–Uther (ATU) 365, "The dead bridegroom carries off his bride" or The Specter Bridegroom, as one of the supernatural adversaries in the folktale index. The tale is similar to stories where a man dies or is killed (in war, in a shipwreck, in an accident), but returns from the dead as a ghost, a zombie or an apparition to his beloved (or wife, or bride) in order to carry her to his grave, in a haunting moonlit horseback ride.

According to scholar John Lindow, variants of the tale type were collected from both Eastern Europe and Western Europe.

== In popular culture ==
This tale has inspired paintings and poems, including poems by Hannes Pétursson and a sculpture by Ásmundur Sveinsson.

The film director Egill Eðvarsson adapted the story to a modern setting, envisioning the deacon as a "bad ass" motorcycle rider.

== See also ==
- Ghost
- Revenant (folklore)
- Draugr
- Gjenganger
- Wiedergänger

== Bibliography ==
- Árnason, Jón; Simpson, Jacqueline. Icelandic Folktales and Legends. Berkeley and Los Angeles: University of California Press. 1972. pp. 132–136. ISBN 0-520-02116-9.
