= Wiedergänger =

German revenant folklore

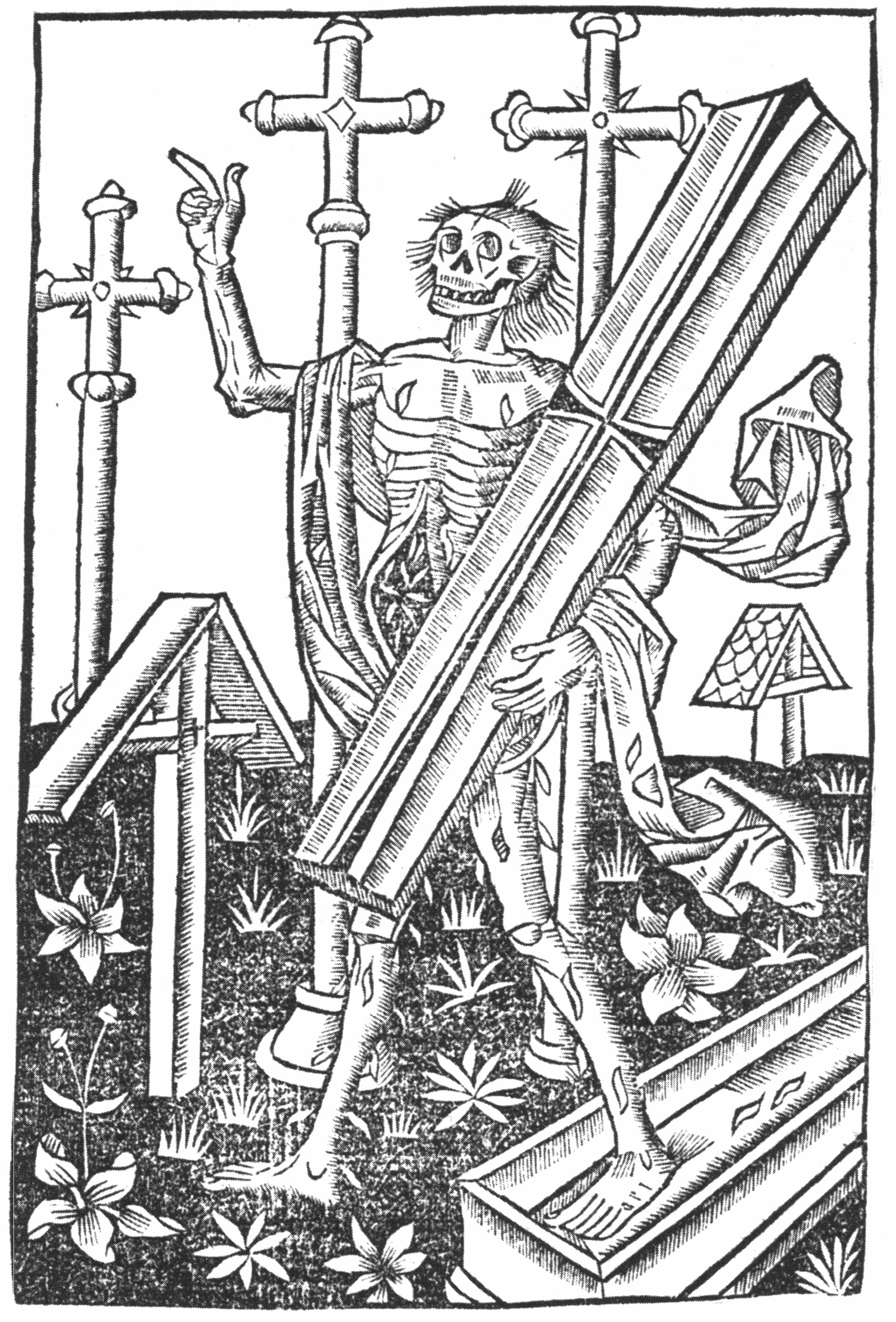
A wiedergänger rises from its coffin. Copy from a 16th–century incunabulum now in the Bavarian State Library of Munich

In German, the term Wiedergänger (German pronunciation: [ˈviːdɐˌɡɛŋɐ]) is a term for a revenant and different ghost phenomena from different cultural areas, meaning "re-walker", or by extension, "one who walks again"; cognate to Scandinavian gjenganger ("again-walker"). The core of the wiedergänger myth is the concept of the deceased, who—often in the form of a physical phenomenon—return to the world of the living. They usually cause problems and frighten living people. They exist either to avenge some injustice they experienced while alive, or because their soul is not ready to be released, as a consequence of their former way of life.

== German beliefs ==
In different parts of Germany, until the early 20th century, the belief was common that dead ones lived on, after their death, and exerted a disastrous influence from the grave. This influence was believed to be partly done via a telepathic effect (sympathy charm), so that the nachzehrer, as the villain was called, did not need to rise from the grave and still could suck the vitality from living persons with his open mouth, his open eye and by gnawing on the burial shroud.

Other undead, in the belief of the people, rose from the graves and jumped on the back of night ramblers. This Aufhocker could assume different shapes, for example in the Rhineland, the form of the werewolf. The humans had to carry him, frequently as far as to the wall of the churchyard or to the place where the body was buried. The aufhocker (also called "huckop" or "huckupp") became ever more heavy, and the victim would finally break down exhausted or dead. In some legends, the troubled humans succeeded in banishing or redeeming the villain by a spell or a prayer.

Especially in the areas marked by Catholicism, the belief of the up-squatting wiedergänger merged with the belief of the soul, so that folklorists around 1920 had considerable difficulties separating a belief in ghosts from the old nuclear belief of the undead wiedergänger. The Aufhocker, after all, could, according to the tradition, not be a ghost, because he had a tangible body, which also increased in weight from step to step, which would not have been possible for an immaterial spirit.

Another form of the physical wiedergänger is the headless rider that, frequently mentioned in West German legends, entered into world literature and even into the history of film through the American poet Washington Irving and his novel The Legend of Sleepy Hollow.

== Nordic countries ==
The Nordic countries have several linguistical analogues to German: Wiedergänger, such as Danish: genganger, Norwegian: gjenganger, Swedish: gengångare, meaning "again-walker", and Icelandic: afturganga, meaning "after-walker", among more; stemming from Old Norse: aptrgangr ("re-walker") and such. These generally describe a revenant in the broad sense, but can by extension also refer to regular ghosts and visitors from the afterlife etc.

In the Icelandic sagas, a common form of revenant is the draugr, a supernatural corporeal revenant with varying ambiguous traits. It occurs, for example, in the Hrómundar saga Gripssonar and in the Laxdœla saga. Whoever met a draugr is often threatened by imminent death.

== Wiedergänger in Archaeology ==
In Schelluinen, a small town in the Netherlands there was found a skeleton which is interpreted as a Wiedergänger. This individual (a 18 - 20-year-old man) was found buried just outside the boundaries of the churchyard. He was buried with his face downwards, and orientated with his feet to the west and his head to the east (in normal manners individuals were buried the other way around). His body was unneatly, somewhat thrown into a pit. In the pit, on his body lay a lot of stone (slate) so as to maintain the body underground. The body is radiocarbon dated around 1443 A.D.

== Literature ==
- Augustin Calmet: Gelehrte Verhandlung der Materie von den Erscheinungen der Geister, und der Vampire in Ungarn und Mähren. Edition Roter Drache, 2007. ISBN 978-3-939459-03-3 Scholarly negotiation of the subject of the apparitions of the spirits, and the Vampires in Hungary and Mähren
- Peter Kremer: Draculas Vettern. Auf der Suche nach den Spuren des Vampirglaubens in Deutschland. Düren 2005 Dracula's cousins. Searching for the traces of the Vampire-belief in Germany.
- Erwin Rudolf Lange: Sterben und Begräbnis im Volksglauben zwischen Weichsel und Memel. (Phil. Diss.) Würzburg 1955 (numerous information about wiedergänger-belief in the east of the Deutsche Reich) Dying and funeral in folk belief between Weichsel and Memel.
- Claude Lecouteux: Geschichte der Gespenster und Wiedergänger im Mittelalter. Böhlau, Köln 1987, ISBN 3-412-02587-9 History of the ghosts and wiedergänger in the Middle Ages.
- Michael Ranft, Nicolaus Equiamicus: Traktat von dem Kauen und Schmatzen der Toten in Gräbern. 1734, German translation from Latin 2006 in the UBooks-Verlag. ISBN 3-86608-015-8 Treatise of the chewing and smacking of the dead ones in graves.
- Matthias Schulz: Sumpf der Vampire. Eine in Niedersachsen entdeckte Moorleiche ist über 2600 Jahre alt. Forscher bereiten Hightech-Untersuchungen vor. Hauptfrage: Warum wurden so viele Mumien verstümmelt und angepflockt?, In: Der Spiegel. 27. Juni 2005 Swamp of the vampires. A moorland corpse discovered in Lower Saxony is over 2600 years old. Researchers prepare hightech investigations. Main question: Why were so many mummies mutilated and impaled?
- Thomas Schürmann: Der Nachzehrerglauben in Mitteleuropa. Marburg 1990 The Nachzehrer-belief in middle Europe
- A. Silberschmidt: Von den blutsaugenden Toten. Oder philosophische Schriften der Aufklärung zum Vampirismus. Hexenmond-Verlag, 2006, ISBN 978-3-9809645-5-5 About the bloodsucking dead. Or philosophical writings of the Enlightenment about vampirism.

== See also ==
- Jiangshi
- Revenant (folklore)
- Zombie
