= Lenore (ballad) =

Poem written by Gottfried August Bürger

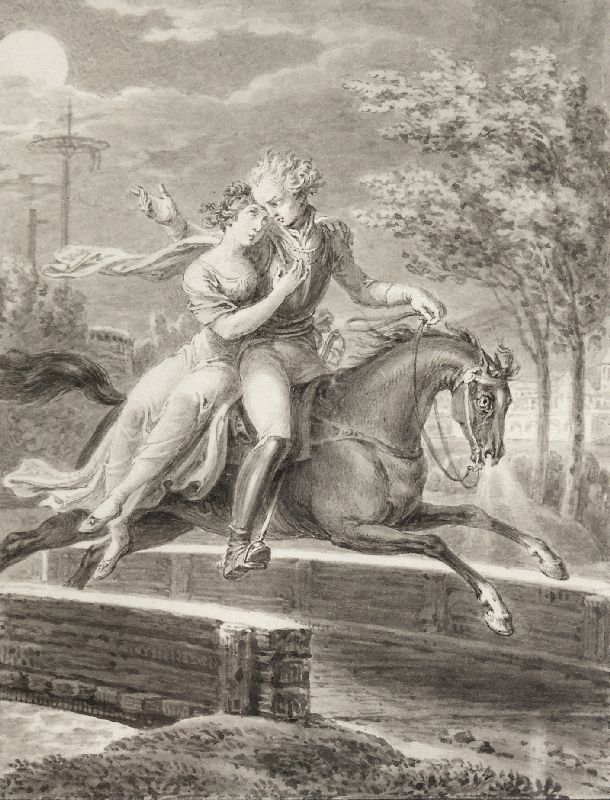
- Lenore and William riding on horseback, as depicted by Johann David Schubert.

Folk tale
- Name: Lenore
- Also known as: Ballade de Lénore; Leonora, Leonore, Ellenore
- Aarne–Thompson grouping: ATU 365 (The Dead Bridegroom carries off his Bride); ATU 365 (The Specter Bridegroom); ATU 365 (La fiancée du mort)
- Region: Germany
- Published in: Göttinger Musenalmanach (1774), by Gottfried August Bürger
- Related: The Deacon of the Dark River; Sweet William's Ghost

Lenore, sometimes translated as Leonora, Leonore, or Ellenore, is a poem written by German author Gottfried August Bürger in 1773, and published in 1774 in the Göttinger Musenalmanach. Lenore is generally characterised as being part of the 18th-century Gothic ballads, and although the character that returns from its grave in the poem is not considered to be a vampire, the poem has been very influential on vampire literature. William Taylor, who published the first English translation of the ballad, would later claim that "no German poem has been so repeatedly translated into English as 'Ellenore'".

== Background ==
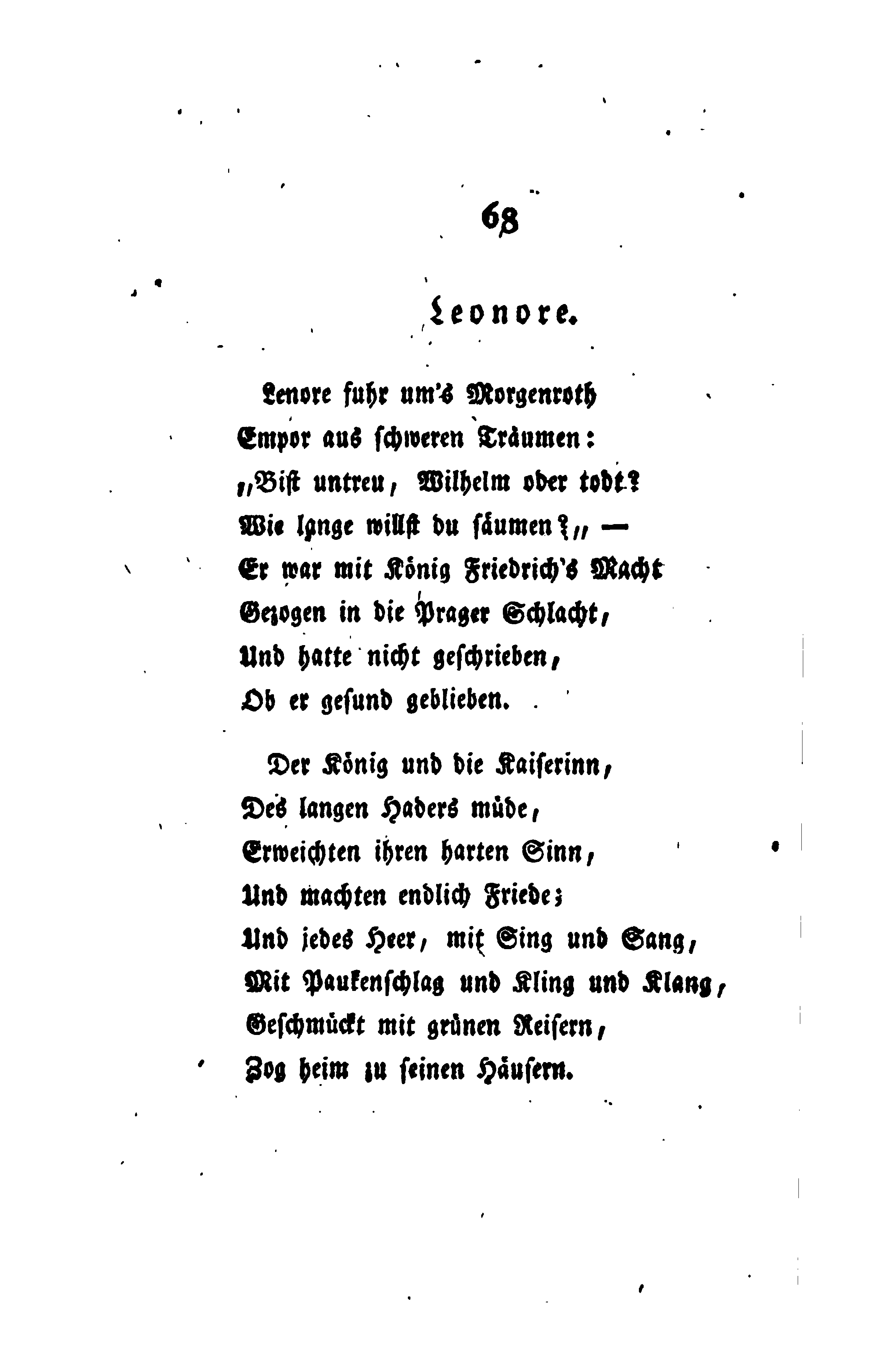
An 1817 edition of Lenore, published by Dieterichsche Buchhandlung

In the 18th century there were around three hundred different German-speaking political entities in Central Europe. During this period, due to influences from the Renaissance and the Enlightenment, Latin and French dominated over the German language, and German literature had mostly been modelled after French and Italian literature. These factors led few scholars to recognize the existence of a distinct German culture or literature.

In order to gain acknowledgement for the German language and thus acquire a distinctively German literary tradition from which it would be possible to get a sense of nationality, philosopher Johann Gottfried Herder believed that it was necessary to preserve German idioms, since they were the element that gave the language its idiosyncrasy and distinguished it from others:

The idioms are the elegances of which no neighbor can deprive us and they are sacred to the tutelary goddess of the language. They are the elegances woven into the spirit of the language, and this spirit is destroyed if they are taken out. [...] Take the idiomatic out of a language and you take its spirit and power. [...] The idioms of the time of the Meistersänger, of Opitz and Logau, of Luther, etc. should be collected [...] And if they are good for nothing else they will at least open the way to the student of the language so he can understand the genius of the nationality, and explain one by the other. The idioms of every language are the impressions of its country, its nationality, its history.

After reading Reliques of Ancient English Poetry by Thomas Percy and James Macpherson's Ossianic poems, Herder thought the means through which Germany could create a unique literature of its own would be to collect folk songs among the lower classes of Germany:

It will remain eternally true that if we have no Volk, we shall have no public, no nationality, no literature of our own which shall live and work in us. Unless our literature is founded on our Volk, we shall write eternally for closet sages and disgusting critics out of whose mouths and stomachs we shall get back what we have given.

Bürger answered Herder's plea by publishing Lenore, which had been suggested to him by a Low German Volkslied that (according to his biographer, Althof) he heard a peasant girl singing one night, but could only remember a small portion of:

The moon it shines so bright—
The dead ride quick by night.
Dost thou not fear, my love!

Achim von Arnim and Clemens Brentano claimed to have collected this song in Des Knaben Wunderhorn (1805), which was translated by William Thoms (1834), and John William Weidemeyer (1865), but this was contested by Johann Heinrich Voss, who claimed this song dates to the same time as Bürger's. It is similar to the Scottish ballad of "Sweet William's Ghost" collected in Percy's Reliques. William Taylor has also compared Lenore to "an obscure English ballad called 'The Suffolk Miracle'", in which a young man appears to his sweetheart, who has no knowledge that he had already died, and carries her on horseback for forty miles until the man complains he has a headache, which leads the maid to tie her handkerchief around his head. After they depart, the young maid returns home and is informed by her father that her lover had in fact died, whereupon he goes to the young man's grave and digs up the bones, finding that his daughter's handkerchief is tied around the skull.

== Synopsis ==
Although the Battle of Prague is over, William, the fiancé of a young woman named Lenore, has not returned from the Seven Years' War yet. Ever since he had gone to battle in the army of King Frederick, Lenore has been impatiently worrying about William every day and longing for his return, but she has not heard any news from him. When the other warriors return from the war without William, she begins to quarrel with God, complaining about His unfairness and proclaiming that He has never done her any good, which prompts her mother to ask for her daughter's forgiveness because she knows that such a thought is blasphemous and will condemn her to Hell.

At midnight, a mysterious stranger who looks like William knocks on the door searching for Lenore and asks her to accompany him on horseback to their marriage bed. Lenore happily gets on the stranger's black steed and the two ride at a frenetic pace, under the moonlight, along a path filled with eerie landscapes. Terrorised, Lenore demands to know why they are riding so fast, to which he responds that they are doing so because "the dead travel fast" (die Todten reiten schnell). Lenore asks William to "leave the dead alone" (Laß sie ruhn, die Todten).

At sunrise, their journey ends and they arrive at the cemetery's doors. As the horse goes through the tombstones, the knight begins to lose its human appearance, and is revealed as Death, a skeleton with a scythe and an hourglass. The marriage bed is shown to be the grave where, together with his ruined clothes, William's skeleton lies. The ground beneath Lenore's feet begins to crumble and the spirits, dancing in the moonlight, surround dying Lenore, declaring that "no one is to quarrel with God in Heaven" (mit Gott im Himmel hadre nicht). However, Lenore, punished with death, still has hope for forgiveness (des Leibes bist du ledig / Gott sei der Seele gnädig).

== Reception and impact ==
Lenore had a profound effect on the development of Romantic literature throughout Europe and a strong influence on the English ballad-writing revival of the 1790s. According to German language scholar John George Robertson,

[Lenore] exerted a more widespread influence than perhaps any other short poem in the literature of the world. [...] like wildfire, this remarkable ballad swept across Europe, from Scotland to Poland and Russia, from Scandinavia to Italy. The eerie tramp of the ghostly horse which carries Lenore to her doom re-echoed in every literature, and to many a young sensitive soul was the revelation of a new world of poetry. No production of the German "Sturm und Drang"—not even Goethe's Werther, which appeared a few months later—had such far-reaching effects on other literatures as Bürger's Lenore; it helped materially to call the Romantic movement in Europe to life.

In a similar tone, English literature scholar Marti Lee claims that:

"Lenore" had tremendous influence on the literature of the late eighteenth- and early [n]ineteenth-centuries, and in fact, today's popular horror books and movies are still feeling the reverberations. [...] In short, Bürger’s achievement, while minor in itself, helped father an international movement that led directly to the massive popularity of Gothic works then and now. [...] As the Gothic novel borrowed many of its original conventions from the German ballads, as popularized by "Lenore," we can fairly say that Bürger is one of the most influential founding fathers of the Gothic and horror genres.

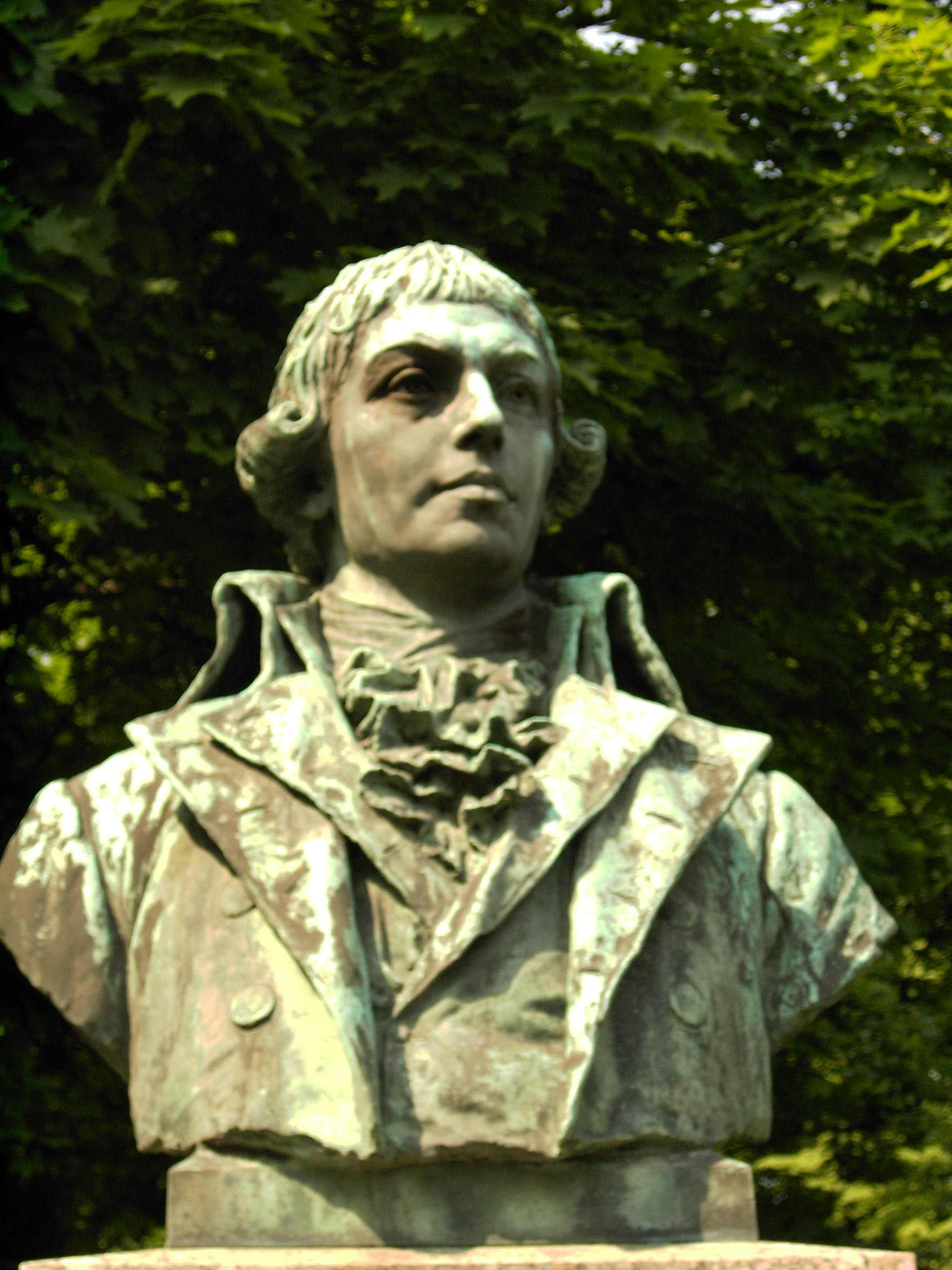
Gottfried August Bürger

Lenore was an immediate sensation in Germany and was widely translated into different languages, which brought it a great deal of popularity in many European countries and the United States, and also generated numerous "imitations, parodies, [and] adaptations". Its first English translation was published in March 1796, when William Taylor's rendering of the ballad, "Ellenore", appeared in the Monthly Magazine. The translation, however, was completed in 1790, and it had already been "declaimed, applauded and much discussed in Norwich literary circles". After Walter Scott heard how enthusiastically a crowd at Dugald Stewart's house had reacted to a reading of Taylor's version done by Anna Laetitia Barbauld, he attempted to acquire a manuscript of Bürger's original. In 1794, when he had finally received one, he was so impressed by it that he made his own rendering, William and Helen, in less than a day. Scott's version was passed from hand to hand, and was extremely well received. In 1796, three new English translations were published by William Robert Spencer, Henry James Pye and John Thomas Stanley. Translations by James Beresford and Dante Gabriel Rossetti were published in 1800 and 1844, respectively, and both have been hailed as the most faithful translations of Bürger's original work.

Other notable translators of Lenore into English include Frederic Shoberl, Julia Margaret Cameron and John Oxenford. Sigmund Zois and France Prešeren translated the ballad into Slovene, while Vasily Zhukovsky and Pavel Katenin published translations in Russian. A version in Italian was made by Giovanni Berchet and both Leopoldo Augusto de Cueto and Juan Valera made their own translations to Spanish. Gérard de Nerval, who was obsessed with the text, published five translations in French, two in prose and three in verse.

Between 1797 and 1800, Samuel Taylor Coleridge wrote Christabel, which according to some German critics was influenced by Bürger's Lenore. We can also find a strong influence of Lenora in the ballad Escape (1832, Ucieczka) by the Polish poet Adam Mickiewicz. Percy Bysshe Shelley was also impressed by Lenore and treasured a copy of the poem which he had handwritten himself. Shelley biographer Charles S. Middleton further suggests that "it is hinted, somewhat plausibly, that the Leonora of Bürgher first awakened his poetic faculty. A tale of such beauty and terror might well have kindled his lively imagination". Influences of Bürger's poem on "Monk" Lewis, John Keats and William Wordsworth have also been noted, and some of its verses have been used by other authors on their own works. The verse die Todten Reiten schnell ("The dead travel fast") is also particularly famous for being cited by Bram Stoker in the first chapter of his novel Dracula (1897). Charles Dickens alludes to the thought that "The dead travel fast" in A Christmas Carol (1843), during an exchange between Scrooge and the ghost of Marley ("You travel fast?" said Scrooge. "On the wings of the wind," replied the Ghost.) The poem, and its verse Laß sie ruhn, die Todten ("Leave the dead in peace"), inspired Ernst Raupach's 1822 short story "Laßt die Todten ruhen" ("Let the Dead Rest").

== Adaptations ==
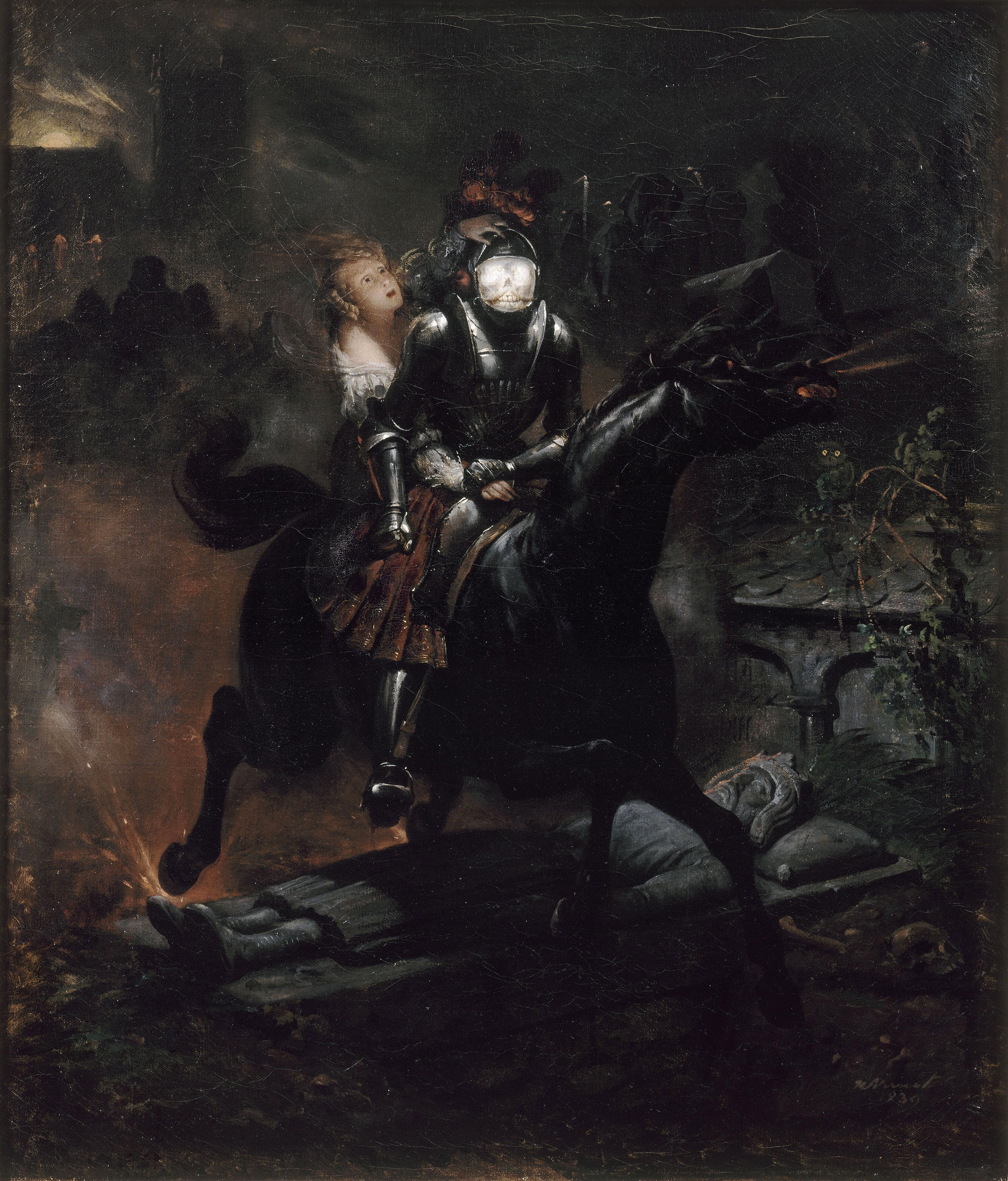
The Ballad of Lenore by Horace Vernet, 1839

Russian poet Vasily Zhukovsky wrote two free adaptations of Bürger's ballad: Lyudmila (1808), which is considered the first Russian ballad, and Svetlana (1813). In both of these, Zhukovsky gave the story a Russian setting. Zhukovsky also wrote a more accurate translation in 1831, maintaining the original title and setting. Zhukovsky's contemporary Pavel Katenin freely adapted the story of Lenore in his own work Olga (1816).

In 1828, Karl von Holtei wrote Lenore, a dramatization of Bürger's ballad which achieved great popularity. Several composers have written pieces based on, or inspired by, Lenore. Joachim Raff's Symphony No. 5, named Lenore, one of his best-regarded works and which he finished writing in 1872, has been described by pianist Donald Ellman as "a most important pivotal work between early and late-romantic styles". It also inspired Klughardt's Symphony No. 1 of 1873. In 1874, Henri Duparc wrote his symphonic poem Lénore, which was then arranged for two pianos by Camille Saint-Saëns and for piano duet by César Franck. Musicologist Julien Tiersot called it "one of the best models of its kind". Between 1857 and 1858, Franz Liszt wrote his first melodrama, Lenore, based on Bürger's ballad. Maria Theresia von Paradis also composed a ballad for voice and piano in 1789 based on Lenore.

Lenore has also inspired several illustrations by a large number of notable artists, including Carl Oesterley, Daniel Chodowiecki, Ary Scheffer, Horace Vernet, Johann Christian Ruhl, Hermann Plüddemann, Johann Heinrich Ramberg, Louis Boulanger, Otto Schubert, Eugen Napoleon Neureuther, Karl Friedrich Lessing, Frank Kirchbach, Georg Emanuel Opiz, William Blake, Franz Stassen, Franz Kolbrand, Octave Penguilly L'Haridon, Wilhelm Emelé, Alfred Elmore and Frank Stone. Lady Diana Beauclerk's depictions of the ballad were published in William Robert Spencer's rendering, while Daniel Maclise and Moritz Retzsch illustrated Julia Margaret Cameron and Frederic Shoberl's translations, respectively.

The main plot of the ballad is classified as Aarne–Thompson–Uther ATU 365, "The dead bridegroom carries off his bride" or The Specter Bridegroom, a sister story to Icelandic ghost story/folk tale The Deacon of the Dark River.
