= Skaga Stave Church =

Church building in Karlsborg Municipality, Sweden

Coordinates: 58°44.9′N 14°25.4′E

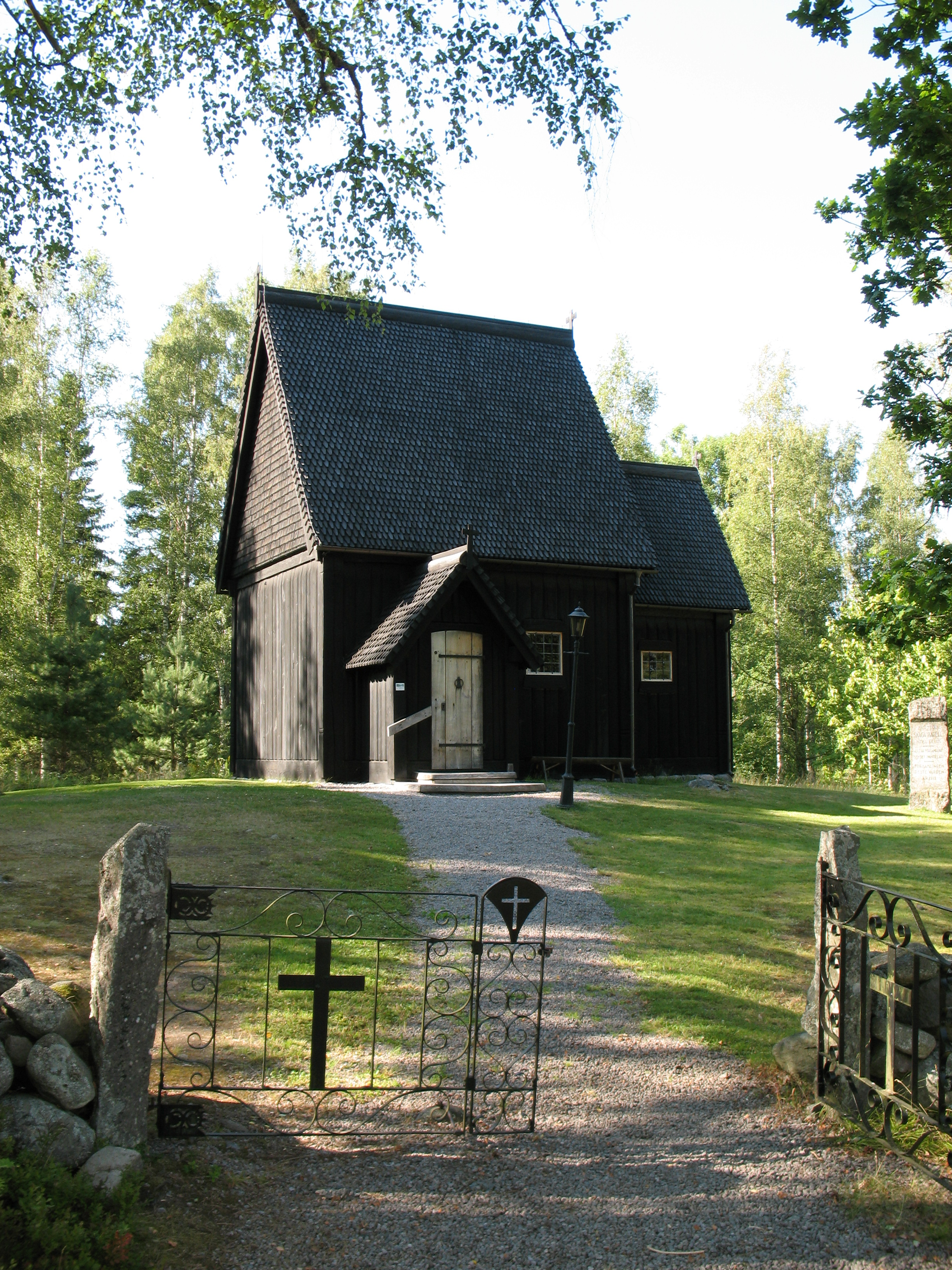
The reconstructed stave church in 2008.

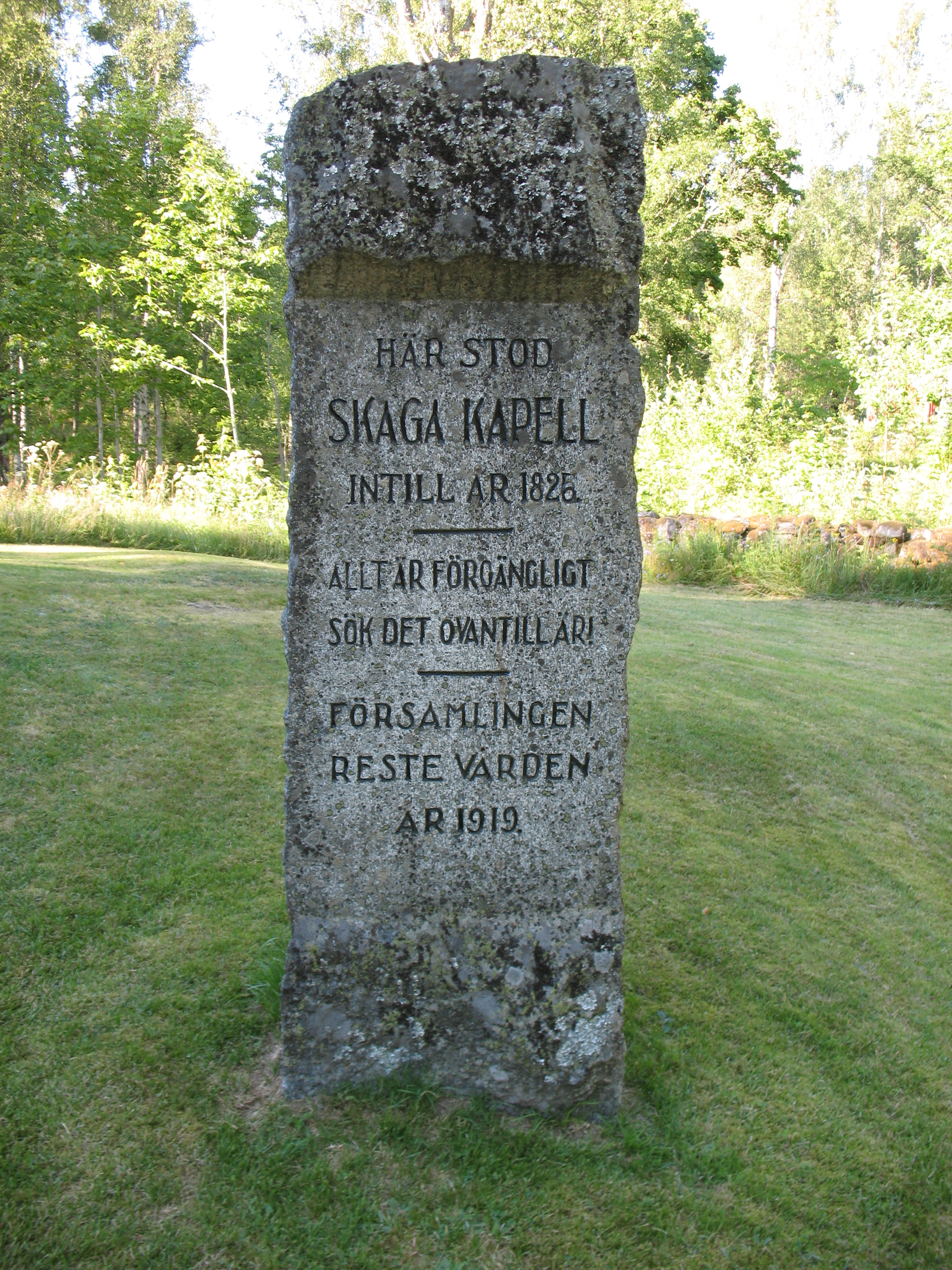
A memorial made by locals in 1919, in remembrance of the church. The inscription says "Here stood Skaga chapel until the year 1826, everything is temporary, seek what is above [ie: in Heaven], the congregation raised the memorial, 1919".

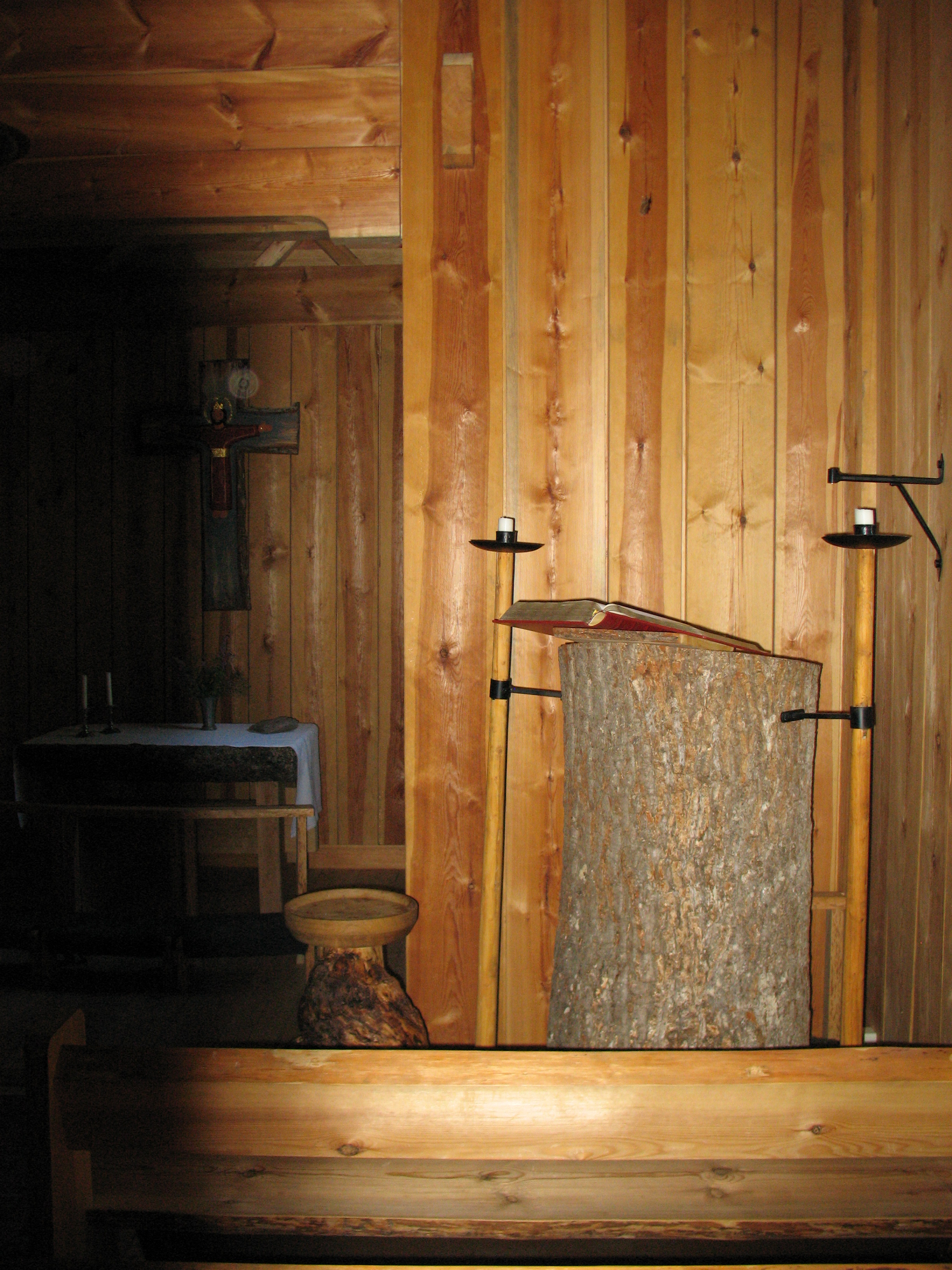
The pulpit is made of a single trunk.

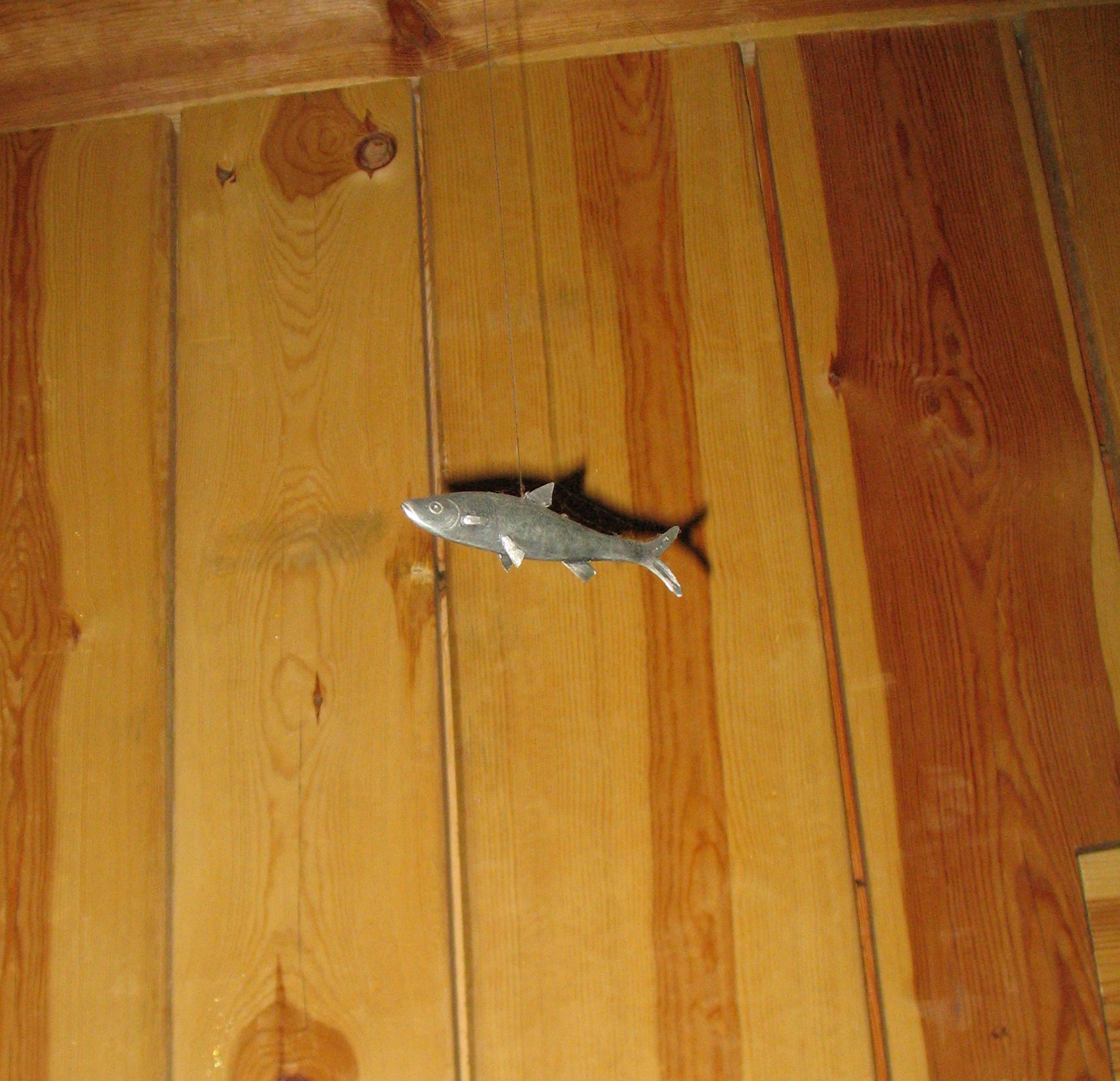
Even the silver bleak has been reconstructed and hangs above the pulpit.

Skaga Stave Church is a twice rebuilt medieval stave church in Tiveden, Karlsborg Municipality, Sweden. The original chapel was built in the 1130s during the Christianization of Scandinavia, but it was demolished in 1826 to combat persistent pagan practices in the area. The locals wanted their church back and worked for it to be rebuilt. In 1960, a reconstruction was inaugurated, but it burnt down in 2000. The following year, the church was rebuilt once again.

== History and legends ==
The original church has been dated to the 1130s. Over the course of centuries, folklore has produced many legends on Skaga stave church. One of the legends relates that a Viking warrior named Ramunder the Evil owned a homestead at lake Unden nearby. His daughter Skaga was so weak when she was born that he decided to leave her in the forest to be devoured by wild beasts, which was an old Scandinavian custom when children were not desired. However, one of Ramunder's dogs discovered her and carried her back home. The mother thought this to be a sign from the Norse gods and let her live. Some time later, Ramunder departed on a Viking expedition and one of the spoils he brought back from the South was a monk. The monk and Skaga became good friends, and he baptized her in secret. Later, when Skaga had inherited the homestead, she had the stave church built where people conducted their pagan sacrifices, in order to help the Christianization of the area. Eventually it became the church of its own parish.

In the 14th century, the Black Death arrived and killed the entire population in the parish. The forest reclaimed the pastures, the fields and the settlements. Generations later, when people settled anew in the area, the stave church was the only remaining building, and it was once again the centre of a parish. There are many traditions on how the chapel was rediscovered. One legend relates that a hunter spotted what he believed to be a mossy rock in the forest. On closer inspection he discovered that it was a building, and he passed through the verdant gate. In the darkness, he was frightened by discovering a sleeping bear, which he managed to kill.

Until 1774, there were services in the church four times per year: Lady Day, Ascension of Jesus, Midsummer and Michaelmas. Later, the clergymen refused to have anything to do with the church because of "its derelict condition", but it was likely that the aversion related to the sacrifices at the location. In 1779, the church forbade any services at the stave church in order to let the church rot away through disuse and disrepair, together with the local superstitions that surrounded the church.

== Pagan rites and its destruction ==
The stave church was demolished by church authorities in 1826. The destruction was the result of the controversies surrounding the use of a nearby well for pagan sacrifices, a custom which likely predated the Christianization of the area. After the stave church had been built the pagan sacrifices were superficially Christianized and people said that they sacrificed to the "holy one in Skagen" who officially was John the Baptist, the patron of the stave church. Those who conducted the sacrifices were people who wanted help against an illness, but they could also want a better harvest or more luck when hunting and fishing. It is said that one man did not succeed in catching any bleaks in the nearby lake and so he had a silver fish crafted, which was hung above the pulpit.

The sacrifices were often given in recognition of having received help, and they were of various kinds: rings, clothes, hides, coins, etc. Throughout the years, the amassed wealth of offerings came to be very high, and people said "we should be able to raise the church on pillars of gold". The main church at nearby Undenäs benefited from the sacrifices and regularly reaped what people had left, but it kept the wealth for itself and allowed the old stave church to deteriorate. The clergymen of the Diocese of Skara appealed to the Parliament of Sweden for a crackdown on the sacrifices, and they wanted an end to the superstition that surrounded the "abomnable pagan shrine".

In spite of protests from the parishioners, the Diocese had the church demolished, but the destruction could not take place before the death of Pehr Tham, who actively protected the church and died in 1820.

== Second construction ==
The contents of the church were sold at an auction but many objects were saved by the parishioners, who eventually began to work for a reconstruction of the church. In 1955, the Skaga foundation was formed and in the midsummer of 1960 a reconstructed church was inaugurated on the same spot. The new church had been designed based on old drawings, notes and preserved objects from the old church. Just as in the original church, a bear's hide constituted the mat, the pulpit was carved from a single large log, and a silver bleak hung above the pulpit. Finally, the locals had succeeded in fulfilling their dream of recreating their old stave church.

== Third construction ==
In January 2000, the reconstructed stave church burnt down, but thanks to an insurance and private donations, the church could be rebuilt. The present construction was inaugurated at Midsummer 2001.

== See also ==
- Hedared Stave Church
- Trollkyrka

== Notes ==
References

- Dahlberg, F. (1978) Tiveden, Wahlströms & Widstrand. ISBN 91-46-13210-4
- Karlsson, S. (1970) I Tiveden, Reflex, Mariestad.
