= Nachzehrer =

Revenant in German folklore

In German folklore, a Nachzehrer (German: [ˈnaːxˌt͡seːʁɐ], literally "after-consumer" (a creature that consumes from the afterlife) in German; also spelt Nachtzehrer, literally "night-consumer") is a type of Wiedergänger (revenant), which was believed to be able to drag the living after it into death, either through malice or through the desire to be closer to its loved ones through various means.

The word Nachzehrer came to use in the nineteenth century, but belief in the creature the label is applied to precedes this by several centuries. The nachzehrer was prominent in the folklore of the northern regions of Germany, but also in Silesia and Bavaria, and the word was also used to describe a similar creature of the Kashubes of Northern Poland. The nachzehrer was similar to the Slavic vampire in that it was known to be a recently deceased person who returned from the grave to attack family and village acquaintances.

== Overview ==
A nachzehrer was thought to be able to drain their victim's life-force remotely. This could involve devouring their own funeral shrouds and clothing – thought to be a very common sign of a nachzehrer. The danger was thought to be particularly great if the living had given the deceased some of their own possessions (e.g. as grave goods). Another belief was that if a person's name was not removed from their burial clothing, that person would be a candidate for becoming a nachzehrer. Open eyes or mouths, red lips, and a soft corpse were all seen as signs of a nachzehrer. Further evidence was the corpse holding its thumb in its opposite hand.

They were associated with epidemic sickness, but this was not a necessity for their existence.

== See also ==
- Draugr (Norse mythology and Scandinavian folklore)
- Revenant (English folklore)
- Ghoul (Middle Eastern folklore)

== Bibliography ==
- Bohn, Matthew (2019). The Vampire: Origins of a European Myth. Berghahn Books.
- Bunson, Matthew (1993). The Vampire Encyclopedia. Gramercy. ISBN 0-517-16206-7.
- Geige (1974). "Nachtzehrer". In Bächtold-Stäubli, Hanns; Hoffmann-Krayer, Eduard (eds.). Handwörterbuch Des Deutschen Aberglaubens Vol. 6: Mauer - Pflugbrot. Walter de Gruyter.
- "Vampire woman of Venice". Archived from the original on 2013-05-30.
