= Sweet William's Ghost =

Traditional song

Sweet William's Ghost (Child 77, Roud 50) is an English ballad and folk song which exists in many lyrical variations and musical arrangements. Early known printings of the song include Allan Ramsay's The Tea-Table Miscellany in 1740 and Thomas Percy's Reliques of Ancient English Poetry in 1765. Percy believed that the last two stanzas of the version he published were later additions, but that the details of the story they recounted (specifically the death of Margaret upon William's grave) were original.

The song is Aarne-Thompson type 365, "The Specter Bridegroom".

== Synopsis ==
A lover, usually named William or a variant, appears as a ghost to his love, usually Margaret or a variant. He asks her to release him from his promise to marry her. She may insist that he actually marry her, but he says that he is dead; she may insist that he kiss her, but he says that one kiss would kill her; she may insist on some information about the afterlife, and he tells her some of it; he may tell her that his promise to marry her is a hellhound that will destroy him if she does not free him. In the end she always releases him from his promise, although in some versions she then dies upon his grave.

== Motifs ==
Sir Walter Scott claimed to have been told a similar story by a woman in Shetland, and based his poem Advertisement to the Pirate upon it. He recounted the story of a woman who, finding her lover dead in London, touched his hand to free herself from the visit of his ghost.

== Variants ==
The ballad shows the influence of Clerk Saunders and Proud Lady Margaret.

Other ballads with a similar theme include

- "Fair Margaret and Sweet William"
- "The Unquiet Grave"

A Canadian version of this ballad exists entitled "Lady Margaret", similar in structure to an American ballad of the same name based upon "Fair Margaret and Sweet William".

This form of ballad is also known in many Scandinavian variants (TSB A 67), although the ghost returns not for its freedom from its pledge, but because the woman's grief is harming it.

This ballad was one of 25 traditional works included in Ballads Weird and Wonderful (1912) and illustrated by Vernon Hill (sculptor).

== See also ==
- List of ghosts
- Lenore (ballad)
- Djákninn á Myrká (Deacon of Dark River), Iceland folktale about a dead lover
