= Trollkyrka =

Secluded butte-like rock

Coordinates: 58°43′N 14°37′E

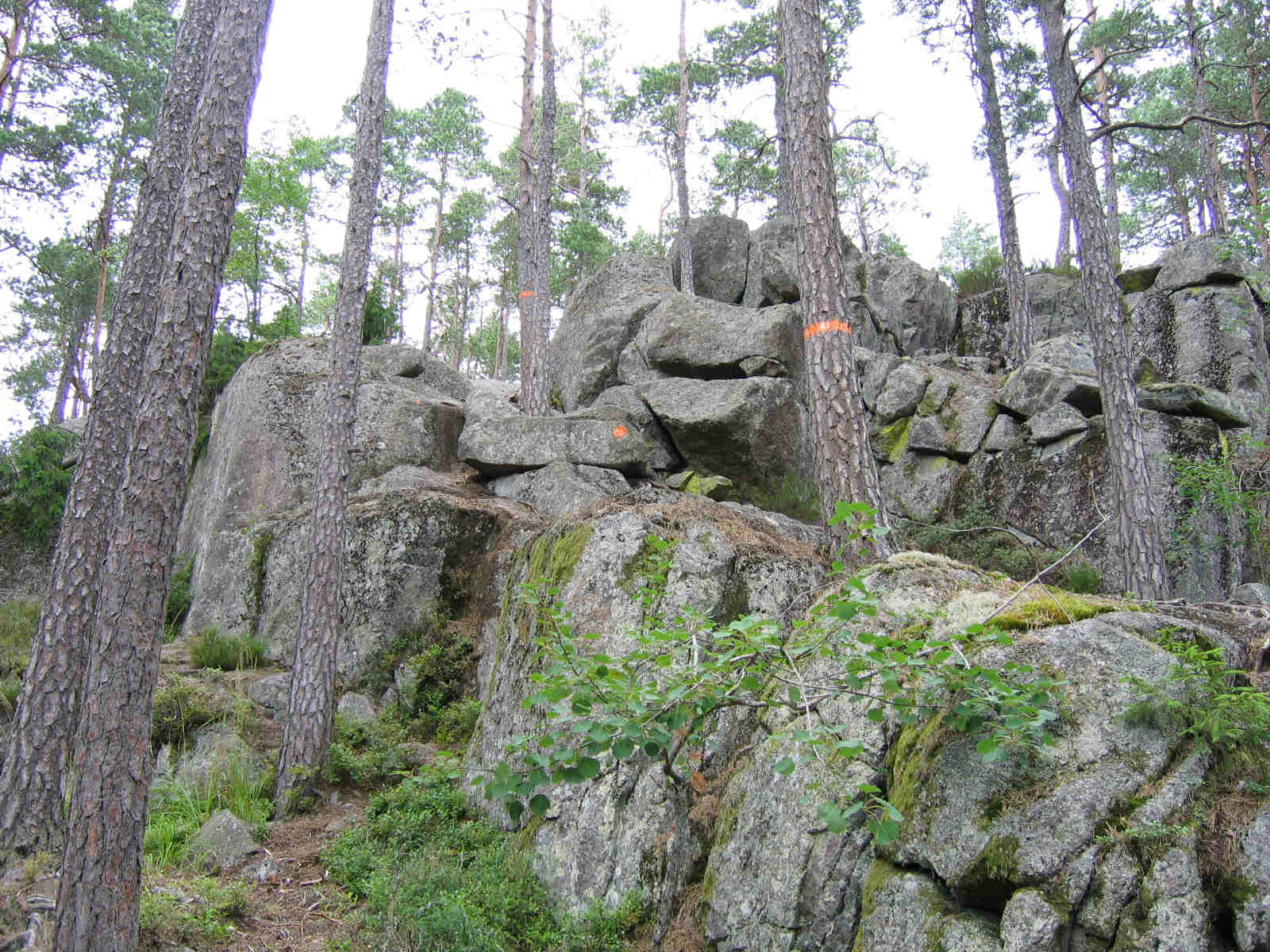
The arduous trail up the "tower" is marked with orange signs

Trollkyrka ("Troll's church") is a secluded butte-like rock in the heart of the National Park of Tiveden, Sweden, which served as a pagan sacrificial ground (horgr, see also blót) for centuries after Christianity became the dominant religion in Scandinavia. It may have been used as late as the 19th century, when popular tradition still held the mountain to be off-limits for Christians.

According to Lidman (1972:52) old people used to say: "No Christian can go there. The mountains of the troll church belong to the heathen trolls. If a Christian ventures there, he will come to grief."

In fact, local tradition relates that the mountain was used not long ago for heathen rites and that anyone who was not initiated and saw it risked either to be buried in a bog in the forest or sworn into the brotherhood. These precautions clearly indicate that the rites took place as late as the period 1604–1735, which was a time when there was a penalty of death on practising such rituals. The rites are described in a folk poem documented by the folklorist Carshult (1941) when he documented the traditions on Skaga Stave Church. It has later been published in Karlsson (1970:62) and Lidman (1972:52).

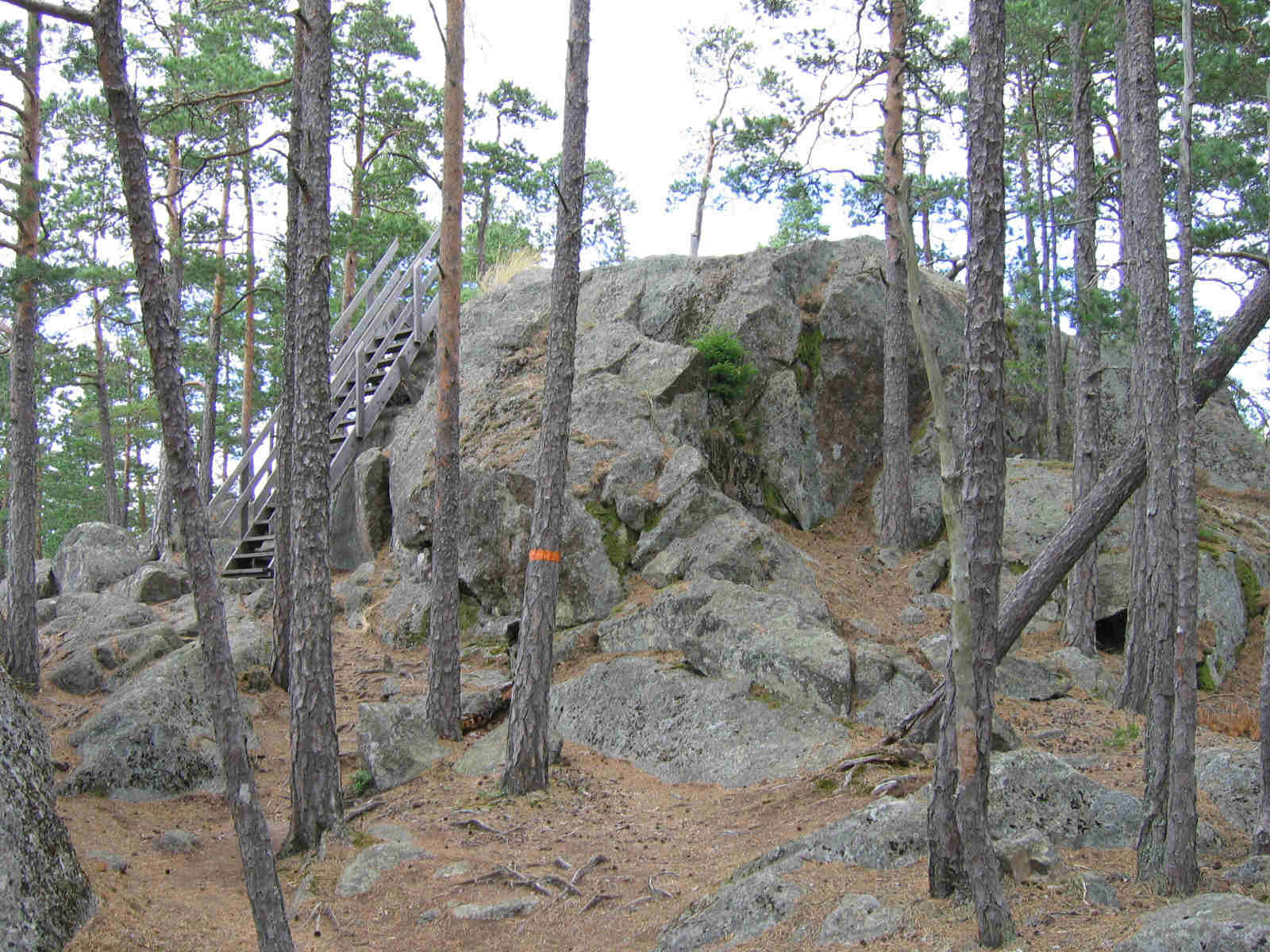
The staircase up the last piece to the "tower of the Trolls' church"

Kärken smyger på slingrande stig	The procession creeps on a meandering path
helst osedd till Trollebergen.	preferably unseen to the Troll mountains/hills.
Mässa skall hållas i dagarna tre,	A mass shall be held for three days,
det varde början på helgen.	this will be the beginning of the holiday.
Kolten är sid, så den nåder vid marken,	The frock is long, so it reaches down to the ground,
håsorna äro i topparna vassa,	the socks are sharply pointed,
hättan dras ned, så hålen för ögonen passa.	the hood is pulled down so that the holes fit for the eyes.
Alla är lika förutom på längda,	Everybody looks alike except for the height,
prelatus han räknar på mängda.	the prelate counts their number.
Lösen den gives i lågmälder ton,	The password is given in a low voice,
prelatus han bjuder tre stötar i horn.	the prelate blows three times in a horn.
Elden den "köllas" av nio slags ved,	The fire is kindled with nine kinds of wood,
det är gammal sed.	that is old custom.
Offer till andarna skänkes,	A sacrifice is offered to the spirits,
med blodet sig allom bestänkes.	everyone is sprinkled with the blood.
Det bästa till andar föräras,	The best part is gifted to spirits,
det som blir över skall av männerna täras.	what remains is to be consumed by the men.
Uti midnattens timma	In the midnight hour
då sjärnor beglimma,	when stars glitter,
prelatus han tystnaden bjuder	the prelate asks for silence
och männerna alla det lyder.	and this is obeyed by all the men.
De falla till markone ner,	They fall down onto the ground,
prelatus han bistert mot rymderna ser.	the prelate looks grimly at the heavens.
Och svärjan och formlar i dälderna skallar	And incantations and summons echo in the dells
prelatus han kallar på andar.	the prelate is summoning spirits.
Allom de fick på sitt spörje ett svar,	Everyone received an answer to their question,
ingen av androm fick då höra varom det var.	nobody got to hear from the other what that [question] regarded.

== See also ==
- Blót
