= Pavel Katenin =

Russian poet

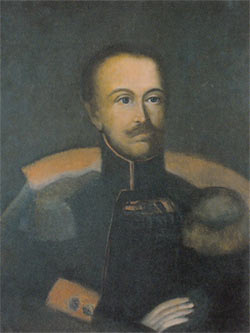
Pavel A. Katenin

Pavel Aleksandrovich Katenin (Russian: Павел Александрович Катенин) (22 December 1792 — 4 June 1853) was a Russian classicist poet, dramatist, and literary critic who also contributed to the evolution of Russian Romanticism.

Katenin took part in the Patriotic War of 1812 and was one of the leaders of the Military Society, which preceded the Decembrists. In 1820, his freethinking attitude led to his being dismissed from the army. Two years later, Count Miloradovich, Governor of St. Petersburg, had him deported from the capital for having booed his own favourite actress.

Katenin was an avid theatre-goer who spurned Shakespeare as vulgar and obscure and admired Corneille and Racine for their noble diction and clarity. His enthusiasm for Neoclassical theatre induced him to translate a number of French tragedies for the Russian stage. He also wrote Andromache (1809–19), the last "regular" Russian tragedy. The actor and playwright Vasily Karatygin was considered his disciple.

Katenin's principal contention was that poetry should be national, and it was this which led him away from the Karamzinians and Zhukovskyites. Disappointed by Zhukovsky's mellifluent translation of Bürger's Lenore, Katenin brought out his own version of the ballad, whose title was Russified as Olga (1816). In this poem he tried to attain nationality by the use of aggressive (and at that time objectionable) realism in diction and detail. He instigated a dispute over the proper method of translating ottava rima, a dispute which resulted in Pushkin's poem The Little House in Kolomna.

Katenin's early ballads had an appreciable influence on the Russian ballads of Pushkin, who esteemed Katenin highly and was almost alone in doing justice to his poetry. In his later work Katenin became excessively archaic, finally breaking away from the taste of the day. In all he did he was a genuine master of technique but he lacked the creative fire that alone infects and attracts. After 1832 he abandoned literature and lived in the seclusion of his estate near Kologriv, a profoundly embittered and dissatisfied man.
