= The Ballad of Lenore =

Painting by Horace Vernet

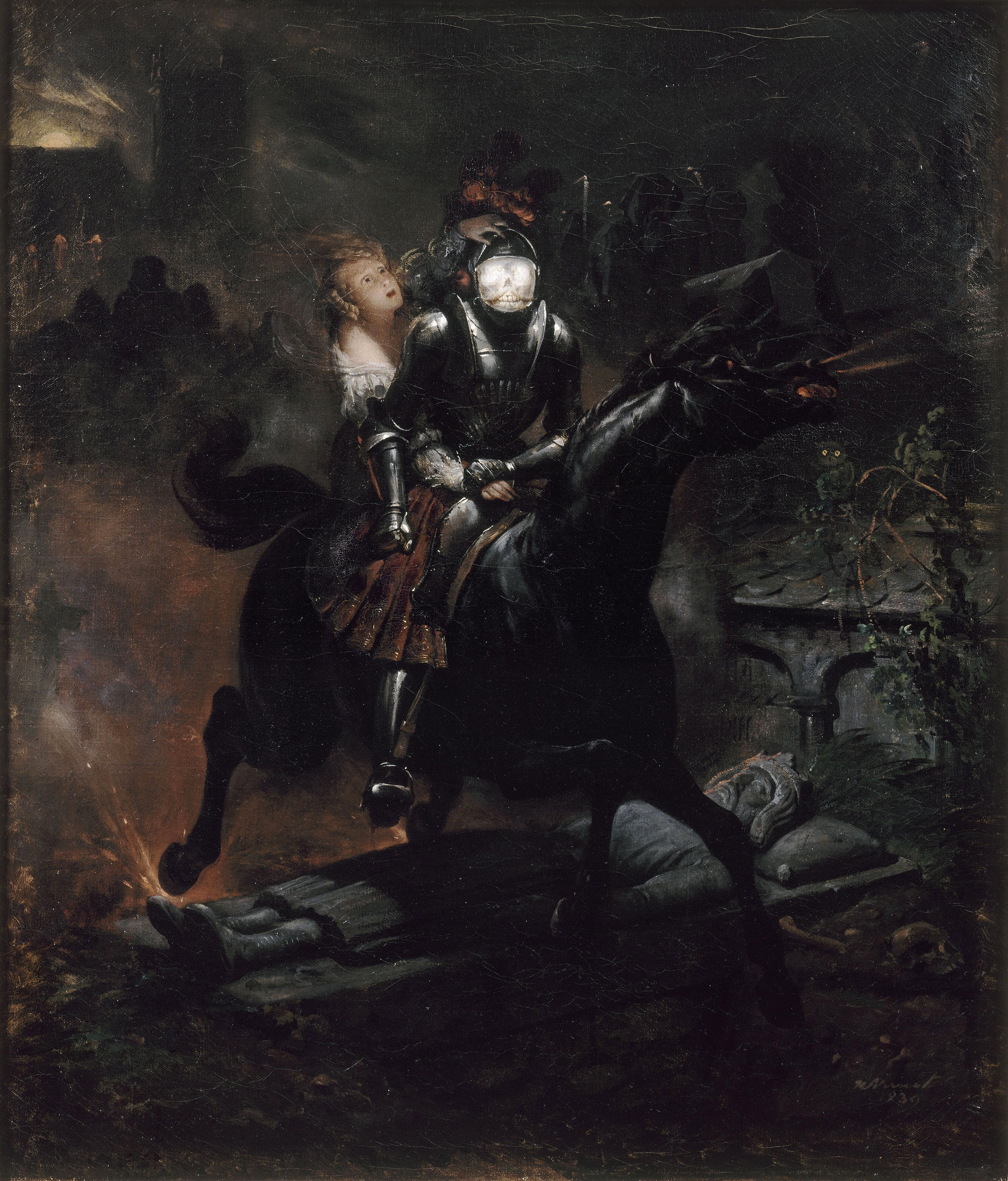
- Artist: Horace Vernet
- Year: 1839
- Type: Oil on canvas, genre painting
- Dimensions: 61 cm × 55 cm (24 in × 22 in)
- Location: Museum of Fine Arts, Nantes

The Ballad of Lenore (French: La Ballade de Lénore) is an 1839 oil painting by the French artist Horace Vernet. Distinctly Romantic in style, it is based on the 1770 Gothic ballad Lenore by Gottfried August Bürger. A young woman waits for her fiancée to return from fighting in the Seven Years' War only to find the man who comes to collect her on horseback is a skeleton.

Vernet was best known for his scenes depicting battle scenes from recent French history, but was a key figure in the French romantic movement. The painting is now in the collection of the Museum of Fine Arts in Nantes, which acquired it in 1854.

== Bibliography ==
- Ferber, Michael. Romanticism: A Very Short Introduction. OUP Oxford, 2010.
- Harkett, Daniel & Hornstein, Katie (ed.) Horace Vernet and the Thresholds of Nineteenth-Century Visual Culture. Dartmouth College Press, 2017.
- Ruutz-Rees, Janet Emily. Horace Vernet. Scribner and Welford, 1880.
- Trapp, Frank. The Attainment of Delacroix. Johns Hopkins Press, 1970.
