= Hrómundar saga Gripssonar =

Icelandic legendary saga

Hrómundar saga Gripssonar or The Saga of Hromund Gripsson is a legendary saga from Iceland. The original version has been lost, but its content has been preserved in the rímur of Hrómundr Gripsson, known as Griplur, which were probably composed in the first half of the 14th century, but survived only in younger manuscripts and first appeared in print in 1896 in Fernir forníslenzkar rímnaflokkar, edited by Finnur Jónsson. These rímur were the basis for later adaptations, among them the seventeenth-century prosification, known as Hrómundar saga Greipssonar (or Gripssonar), which can be found in around 30 manuscripts and was first edited by Erik Julius Björner, and the nineteenth century prosification under the same title, which can be found in four manuscripts and was first edited by Katarzyna Anna Kapitan.

The seventeenth-century saga contains a number of narrative discrepancies, which are probably the result of the scribe working from a partly illegible manuscript of the rímur.

== Contents ==
According to Þorgils saga ok Hafliða, a saga included in the great compilation Sturlunga saga, the original version was composed by the farmer Hrólfr of Skálmarnes and was recited by him at a wedding at Reykjahólar in 1119:

Hrólfr frá Skálmarnesi sagði sögu frá Hröngviði víkíngi ok frá Óláfi Liðsmannakonungi ok haugbroti Þráins berserks ok Hrómundi Gripssyni—ok margar vísur með. En þessari sögu var skemmt Sverri konungi, ok kallaði hann slíkar lygisögur skemmtiligstar. Ok þó kunna menn at telja ættir sínar til Hrómundar Gripssonar. Þessa sögu hafði Hrólfr sjálfr saman setta.

Hrólfr of Skálmarnes told a saga about Hröngviðr the Viking and about Óláfr King of Warriors, and breaking into Þráinn the Berserk's burial mound, and Hrómundr Gripsson—and many verses along with it. King Sverrir found this saga amusing, and he called such "lying sagas" the most entertaining. And yet men are able to reckon their ancestry from Hrómundr Gripsson. Hrólfr had composed this saga himself.

The saga that we now have is about Hrómundr serving king Óláf King of Warriors (Óláfr Liðsmannakonung) and Hrómund's battles with the berserker Hröngvið, as well as the undead witch-king Þráinn, a draugr (he was a former king of Gaul, Valland). Þráinn had killed four hundred and twenty men, including king Sæmingr, legendary first King of Norway, father of Þrand of Trondheim, with his enchanted sword Mistletoe (Mistilteinn.) Hrómund grapples with Þráinn and wins, burns his body and takes Mistletoe. This first section of the saga corresponds with the saga described in Þorgils saga ok Hafliða. It's been questioned whether Þorgils saga could have reported such details accurately over a century after the fact, but even if no such saga was told in 1119, the basic tale must have been familiar by the mid-13th century, when Þorgils saga ok Hafliða itself was written.

Soon afterwards, Hrómundr is slandered to King Olaf and forced to leave his service, but he returns to fight the two kings of Sweden, both named Haldingr or Haddingr, who have invaded Olaf's realm. With them is their champion Helgi Haddingjaskati (Hröngvið's brother) who is aided in battle by his lover Kára's magic. During the battle, she flies overhead in the shape of a swan, and she is probably based on the Valkyrie Kára. Her magical singing causes Helgi's enemies to forget to defend themselves, and Helgi is able to kill all eight of Hrómundr's brothers. When Hrómundr arrives, Helgi accidentally cuts off the swan's leg as he swings his sword, and is no longer protected by Kára's magic. Hrómundr kills Helgi but is severely wounded. His rival at Olaf's court, Vali, gets Mistletoe away from him before Hrómundr kills him as well. After recuperating and finding Mistletoe again, Hrómund slays the last Swedish king Haldingr.

This section of the saga reflects parts of the lost Káruljóð which is mentioned in the prose section of Helgakviða Hundingsbana II. This section says that Helgi Hundingsbane and his lover, the Valkyrie Sigrún are reborn as Helgi Haddingjaskati and Kára. It also reflects others of the "Helgi lays" preserved in the Poetic Edda; an episode in which Hrómundr is searched for by a malicious counsellor named Blindr, but is concealed by being dressed as a female servant grinding grain, is very close to an escapade of Helgi in Helgakviða Hundingsbana II.

It is probably not a historic account of real events since it was remarked by king Sverre of Norway, who heard it, that it was an amusing "lying tale" (lygisaga). Nonetheless, according to Landnámabók, Hrómundr Gripsson was the paternal great-grandfather of Ingolfr Arnarson, the first settler in Iceland. This means that he would have lived in Norway in the first half of the 8th century, and it's not impossible that stories about an ancestor who did exist were handed down by his Icelandic descendants (probably becoming increasingly embellished as time passed).

== Sweden ==
Hrómundr has been connected to Swedish legends of Ramunder hin Onde (Hrómundr the Evil). In these traditions he was a wild and evil Viking who founded the estate of Ramundeboda in the forest of Tiveden, Sweden. His daughter Skaga constructed the Skaga Stave Church.

A number of Scandinavian ballads appear related to the story and one of them served as an inspiration for a Viking metal song, Ramund hin unge by Týr.

== Sources ==
Editions:

- Björner, Eric Julius (1737). Nordiska kämpa dater, i en sagoflock samlade om forna kongar och hjältar. Stockholm.
- Kapitan, Katarzyna Anna (2024). Lost but not forgotten: The saga of Hrómundur and its manuscript transmission. Oxford: Taylor Institution Library. ISBN 978-1-8384641-7-2.
- Rafn, Carl Christian (1829-1830). Fornaldar sögur Nordrlanda eptir gömlum handritum. Copenhagen.

=== Translations ===
- Bachman, W. Bryant; Erlingsson, Guðmundur (1993). Six Old Icelandic Sagas. Lanham, Md.: University Press of America. ISBN 978-0819191564.
- Chadwick, Nora Kershaw (1921). Stories and Ballads of the Far Past. Cambridge: Cambridge University Press. pp. 58–78.
- Waggoner, Ben (2014). Six Sagas of Adventure. New Haven: The Troth. ISBN 978-1941136041.
