= Gjenganger =

Nordic revenant folklore

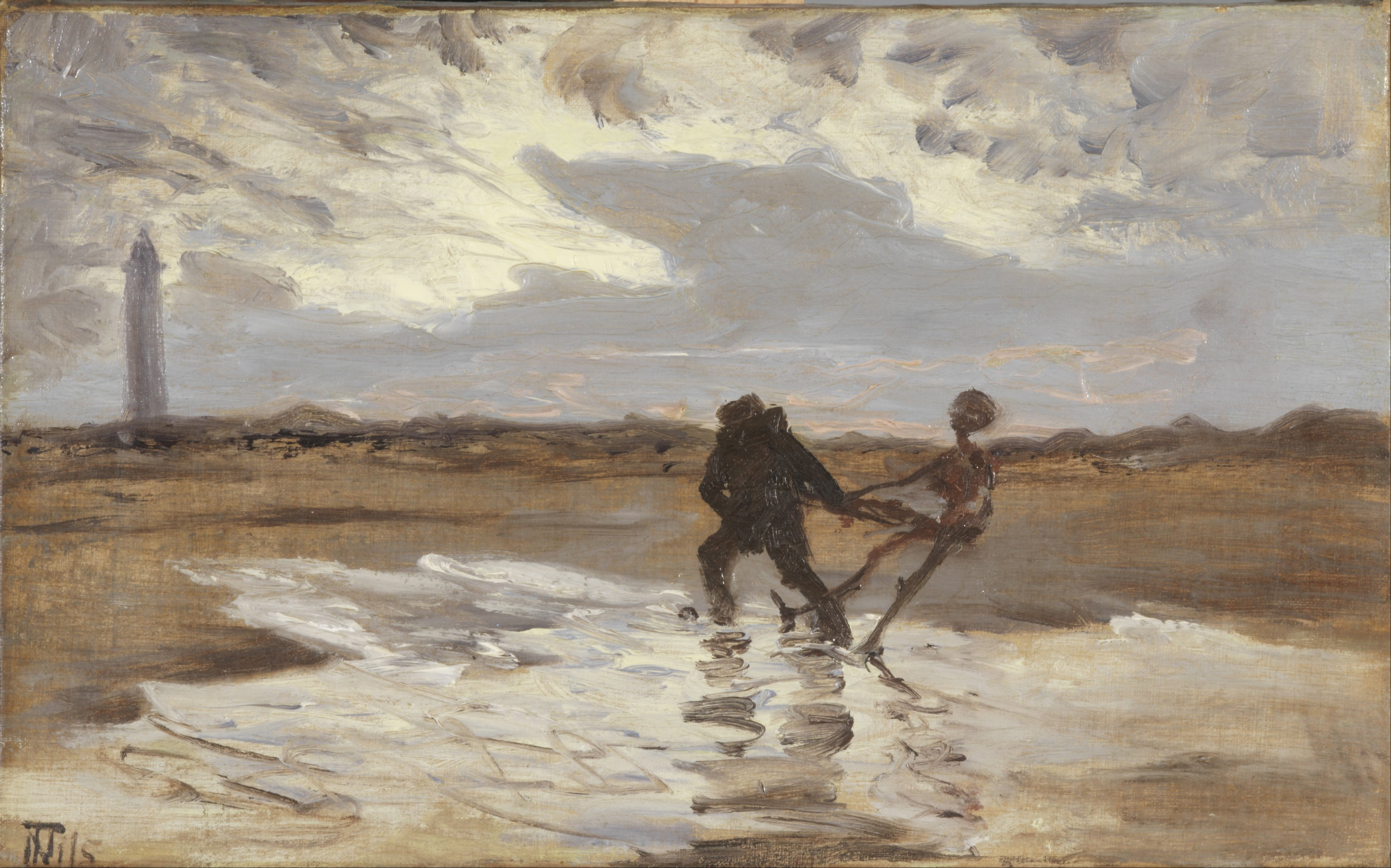
Gjenganger tries to claim a new victim for the sea, Thorvald Niss (1932)

In Nordic folklore; Danish: genganger, Norwegian: gjenganger, Swedish: gengångare ("(a)gain-walker"), among more, is a term for a revenant or ghost, meaning "someone which goes again", from the Scandinavian verb of "going again" (Norwegian: gå igjen, Swedish: gå igen), in the sense of a deceased walking beyond the grave, haunting post-mortem; compare German: Wiedergänger ("Re-walker").

Other forms includes Icelandic: afturganga, Norwegian: attergangar, stemming from Old Norse: aptrgangr ("re-walker"); Danish: genfærd, Norwegian: gjenferd ("again-travel or after-journey").

== Etymology ==
Gjenganger in its regional forms consists of two parts; the prefix gjen-/gen-, a shortened form of igjen/igen ("again" → (a)gain); and the suffix -ganger/-gångare, "-ganger, -goer, -walker" (compare doppelganger); thus meaning "again-walker" (lit. 'gainganger'), "walking again", as in "walking after death". It is related to the Scandinavian verb of "going again" (Swedish: gå igen) with the sense of going around beyond the grave and haunting post-mortem, for example: Swedish: en död som går igen, "a dead which goes beyond" → a dead person which refuses the afterlife to instead walk the earth again as a revenant.

The Norwegian form attergangar means the same but uses the prefix atter (compare Swedish: åter), meaning roughly "re-", but also "again", "once (again)" (Swedish: återigen), "back" etc.; thus meaning "re-walker", which is also found as a root-cognate in Old Norse: aptrgangr and Icelandic: afturganga.

The forms, Danish: genfærd, Norwegian: gjenferd, switches the suffix for Danish: færd, Norwegian: ferd, "travel, journey, trip", related to "fare", "ferry" etc.

== Characteristics ==
A gjenganger could have several reasons to return from the afterlife. Murdered people and their murderers could seldom sleep peacefully in their graves. People who had committed suicide often came back as gjengangere. At other times, people came back from the grave because they had left something undone. Most often they needed someone to help them do this, before they could finally be at peace.

The gjenganger in the Scandinavian tradition took on an entirely corporeal form. It normally had no spectre-like qualities whatsoever. In older traditions, the gjenganger was very malicious and violent in nature, coming back from the grave to torment its family and friends. Their relatives took extensive precautions to make sure they stayed in their graves.

This tradition of the violent gjenganger goes back to the Viking Age, where they are present in many of the Icelandic sagas, among others: Grettis saga, Eyrbyggja saga and The Saga of Eric the Red. In this tradition, the gjenganger was a mortal creature. An example of this is Grettir slaying the gjenganger Glámr with his sword. These Viking-age gjengangere were often called draugr, and the two are likely to be different names for the same phenomenon.

== Protection and prevention ==
People had numerous ways of both defending themselves against the gjenganger, and stopping people from becoming one in the first place.

- Crucifixes and Christian incantations
- Painting symbols, especially the cross
- Coffin was carried three times around the church before being buried.

The tradition of a pile of stones or twigs (varp) often marked a place where someone has died. It was believed that when you passed this place, you should throw another stone/twig on the varp, to commemorate what had happened there. Doing so would sometimes bring luck on your further travels, while not doing so would result in bad luck and dangerous accidents. Many of these varps have now disappeared, but in a few places the varp is marked with a sign or something similar.

== Modern era ==
In slightly newer tradition, the gjenganger remains a violent entity, though in a less direct way, now becoming more of a disease-spreader. These gjengangere would attack people with their so-called dead man's pinch (dødningeknip). The pinch was often administered when the person was asleep. Both the forest creature (huldra) and the water spirits (nøkken) were also accused of doing the same, using bites instead of pinches, often aimed at the victim's face. This belief in beings attacking people in their sleep was used as a warning against going to sleep in specific places; near the graveyard, mountains or water.

In later Swedish folklore, a distinction is made between the traditional gjenganger, in Swedish called gengångare, and another type of ghost known as gast. Whereas the gengångare looked virtually identical to a living human, the gast was known to be transparent and/or skeletal in appearance, making it impossible to see who the phantom had been while alive. And whereas the Swedish version of the gengångare was usually said to be rather harmless, it was the gast who was known to cause diseases. They were also known to cause accidents and scare people for no apparent reason other than that they enjoyed doing so.

Today it mostly compares with the modern perception of ghosts, most often being ethereal in form, and non-violent in nature. The word gjenganger is being used less, the contemporary word ghost (spøkelse) having mostly taken over. Where the term gjenganger does occur, it may be treated simply as a synonym for ghost. The corresponding verbal phrase walk again (gå igjen) is just one way of saying "haunt" with reference to ghosts.

== See also ==
- Draugr
- Wiedergänger

== Bibliography ==
- Espeland, Velle (2002) Spøkelse! Hvileløse gjengangere i tradisjon og historie (Oslo: Humanist forlag) ISBN 9788290425574
- Hodne, Ørnulf (1995) Vetter og skrømt i norsk folketro (Oslo: J.W. Cappelens forlag) ISBN 978-8202154967
- Hodne, Ørnulf (2008) Mystiske steder i Norge (Oslo: J.W. Cappelens forlag) ISBN 9788202282134
- Sivertsen, Birger (2000) For noen troll (Oslo: Andresen & Butenschøn AS) ISBN 9788276940701
