= Revenant =

Ghost or corpse brought to life to terrorize the living

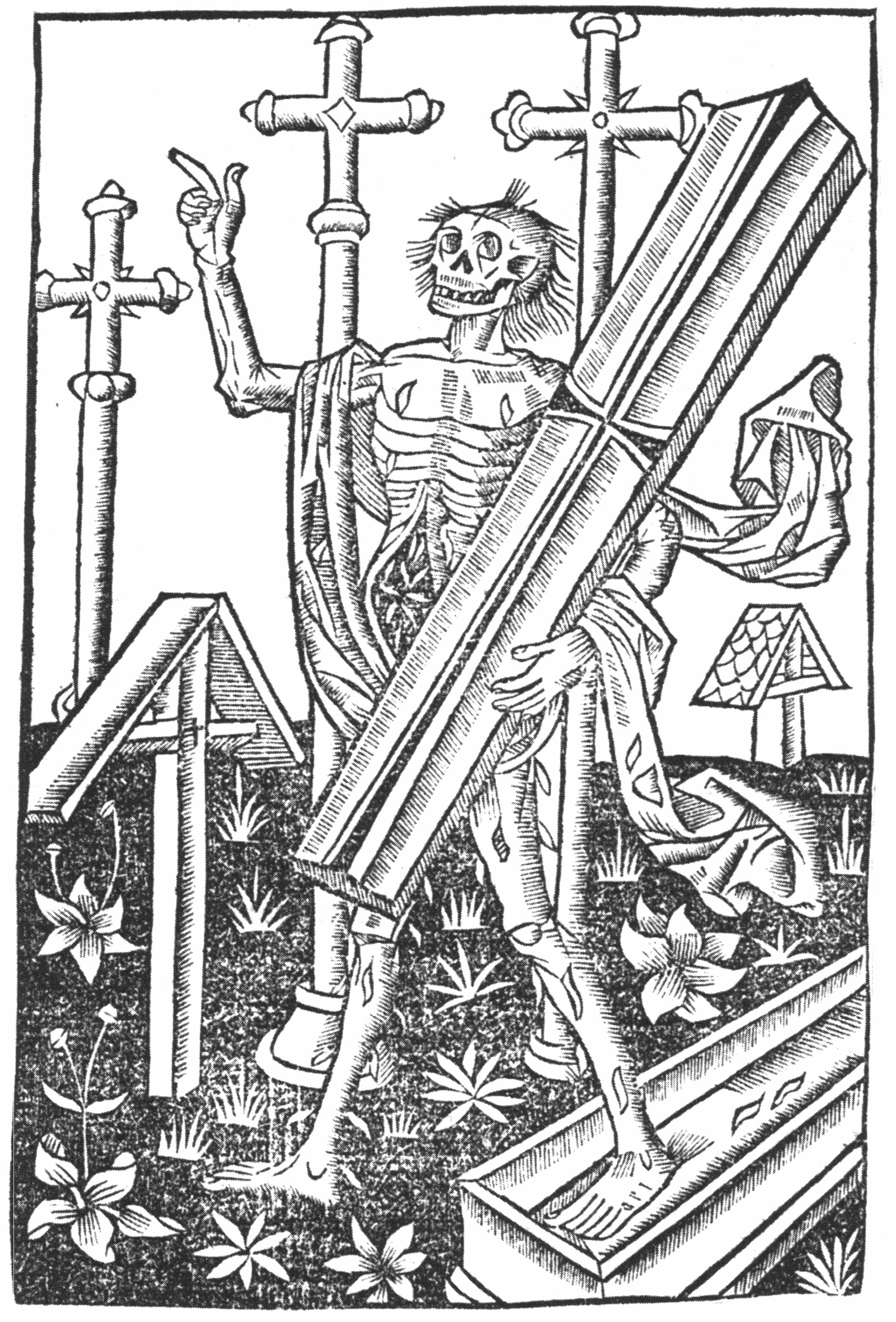

Creature information
- Grouping: Legendary creature
- Sub grouping: Undead

Origin
- Region: Europe; Asia; Oceania; Africa; Americas (especially the West Indies)

In folklore, a revenant is a spirit or animated corpse that is believed to have been resurrected to haunt the living. The word revenant is derived from the Old French word revenant 'returning' (see also the related French verb revenir 'to come back').

Revenants are part of the legend of various cultures, including Celtic and Norse mythology, and stories of supposed revenant visitations were documented by English historians in the Middle Ages.

== Revenant graves ==
Archaeologists have found revenant graves throughout Europe, characterized by bodies that had precautions taken to prevent them from rising up and causing mischief for the living, such as stones placed over the legs, stones placed in the jaw so it could not speak, bodies lodged with bricks, or body parts removed. The oldest known graves are as old as 4,000 years BP from the Bronze Age. Roman literature contained writings about revenants. They were common throughout the Middle Ages, and 17th-century Poland was reportedly a hot-bed of revenant superstition.

== Comparison to other undead ==
The term "revenant" has been used interchangeably with "ghost" by folklorists. While some maintain that vampires derive from Eastern European folklore and revenants derive from Western European folklore, many assert that revenant is a generic term for the undead.

Augustin Calmet conducted extensive research on the topic in his work titled Traité sur les apparitions des esprits et sur les vampires ou les revenans de Hongrie, de Moravie, &c. (1751) in which he describes the related rumors of the time. Calmet compares the ideas of the Greek and Egyptian ancients and notes an old belief that magic could not only cause death but also evoke the souls of the deceased. Calmet ascribed revenants to sorcerers who sucked the blood of victims and compares instances of revenants mentioned in the twelfth century in England and Denmark as similar to those of Hungary, but "in no history do we read anything so usual or so pronounced, as what is related to us of the vampires of Poland, Hungary, and Moravia."

Revenants appear in Nordic literature, mythology, and folklore, variously called aptrgangr (pl. aptrgǫngur, "again-walker(s)"), haugbui (pl. haugbúar, "howe-dweller(s)", i.e. barrow-wight(s)), or draugr (pl. draugar, "phantom(s)" or "ghost(s)"; usually conceived as being corporeal). Modern scholarship and readily accessible references on the web tend to use the terms interchangeably, with a seeming preference for draugr. Stories involving these creatures often involve direct confrontations, including slayings as part of a hero's land-cleansing. Those in burial mounds resist intruders and are sometimes immune to conventional weapons, rendering their destruction a dangerous affair only to be undertaken by heroes. To ensure thorough destruction, the creature's head is often removed, sometimes placed by the corpse's buttocks; sometimes the corpse is burned instead, especially in the case of vampires.

In the folklore and ghost stories of Eastern Scandinavia, Finnish "dead-child beings" are described as revenants animated by restless spirits that could be laid to rest by performing baptism or other Christian rites.

Revenant-like beings can also be found in Caribbean folklore — often referred to as "the soucouyant" (or "soucriant") in Dominican, Trinidadian, Guadeloupean folklore, also known as "Ole-Higue" or "Loup-garou", — as well as in Brazilian folklore, where they are called Corpo Seco or “Dry Body”.

== Selected stories ==
=== William of Newburgh ===
Belief in souls returning from the dead was common in the 12th century, and Historia by William of Newburgh (1136–1198) briefly recounts stories he heard about revenants, as do works by his contemporary, Walter Map.

William wrote that stories of supposed revenants were a "warning to posterity" and so common that, "were I to write down all the instances of this kind which I have ascertained to have befallen in our times, the undertaking would be beyond measure laborious and troublesome." According to William, "It would not be easy to believe that the corpses of the dead should sally (I know not by what agency) from their graves, and should wander about to the terror or destruction of the living, and again return to the tomb, which of its own accord spontaneously opened to receive them, did not frequent examples, occurring in our own times, suffice to establish this fact, to the truth of which there is abundant testimony."

One story involves a man of "evil conduct" absconding from justice, who fled from York and made the ill-fated choice to get married. Becoming jealous of his wife, he hid in the rafters of his bedroom and caught her in an act of infidelity with a local young man, but then accidentally fell to the floor, mortally wounding himself, and died a few days later. As Newburgh describes:

A Christian burial, indeed, he received, though unworthy of it; but it did not much benefit him: for issuing, by the handiwork of Satan, from his grave at night-time, and pursued by a pack of dogs with horrible barkings, he wandered through the courts and around the houses while all men made fast their doors, and did not dare to go abroad on any errand whatever from the beginning of the night until the sunrise, for fear of meeting and being beaten black and blue by this vagrant monster.

A number of the townspeople were killed by the monster and so:

Thereupon snatching up a spade of but indifferent sharpness of edge, and hastening to the cemetery, they began to dig; and whilst they were thinking that they would have to dig to a greater depth, they suddenly, before much of the earth had been removed, laid bare the corpse, swollen to an enormous corpulence, with its countenance beyond measure turgid and suffused with blood; while the napkin in which it had been wrapped appeared nearly torn to pieces. The young men, however, spurred on by wrath, feared not, and inflicted a wound upon the senseless carcass, out of which incontinently flowed such a stream of blood, that it might have been taken for a leech filled with the blood of many persons. Then, dragging it beyond the village, they speedily constructed a funeral pile; and upon one of them saying that the pestilential body would not burn unless its heart were torn out, the other laid open its side by repeated blows of the blunted spade, and, thrusting in his hand, dragged out the accursed heart. This being torn piecemeal, and the body now consigned to the flames...

In another story Newburgh tells of a woman whose husband had recently died. The husband revives from the dead and comes to visit her at night in her bedchamber and he "...not only terrified her on awaking, but nearly crushed her by the insupportable weight of his body." This happens for three nights, and the revenant then repeats these nocturnal visits with other nearby family and neighbours and "...thus become a like serious nuisance," eventually extending his walks in the broad daylight around the village. Eventually the problem was solved by the bishop of Lincoln who wrote a letter of absolution, upon which the man's tomb was opened wherein it was seen his body was still there, the letter was placed on his chest, and the tomb sealed.

=== Abbot of Burton ===
The English Abbot of Burton tells the story of two runaway peasants from about 1090 who died suddenly of unknown causes and were buried, but:

the very same day in which they were interred they appeared at evening, while the sun was still up, carrying on their shoulders the wooden coffins in which they had been buried. The whole following night they walked through the paths and fields of the village, now in the shape of men carrying wooden coffins on their shoulders, now in the likeness of bears or dogs or other animals. They spoke to the other peasants, banging on the walls of their houses and shouting "Move quickly, move! Get going! Come!"

The villagers became sick and started dying, but eventually the bodies of the revenants were exhumed, their heads cut off, and their hearts removed, which ended the spread of the sickness.

=== Walter Map ===
The chronicler Walter Map, a Welshman writing during the 12th century, tells of a "wicked man" in Hereford who revived from the dead and wandered the streets of his village at night calling out the names of those who would die of sickness within three days. The response by bishop Gilbert Foliot was "Dig up the body and cut off the head with a spade, sprinkle it with holy water and re-inter it."

== Popular culture ==
Nordic-style revenants appear as barrow-wights in Tolkien's The Lord of the Rings.

L. Sprague de Camp and Lin Carter's "The Thing in the Crypt" is essentially a retelling of Grettir's encounter with Kar the Old.

In the television series American Gods, Laura Moon is brought back as a revenant in the form of an animated corpse.

Revenants feature prominently in tabletop games and video games as either resurrected beings, as forms of the undead or as general character class archetypes. Most notable games include Doom, Dungeons and Dragons, Red Dead Redemption: Undead Nightmare, Phasmophobia, Pathfinder Roleplaying Game, Guild Wars 2 and the eponymous Revenant.

The title of the 2015 film The Revenant alludes to the ordeal that Hugh Glass had to endure in order to return to civilization after being left for dead following a grizzly bear mauling.

== See also ==
- Chupacabra – Legendary creature in folklore of the Americas
- Draugr – Undead creature from Norse mythology
- Dullahan – Type of mythogical creature in Irish mythology
- Dybbuk – Malicious possessing spirit in Jewish religion
- Gjenganger – Nordic revenant folklore
- Ghost – Supernatural being originating in folklore
- Ghoul – Jinn-like being often associated with eating human flesh in Arabian folklore
- Jiangshi – Type of creature from Chinese legend and folklore
- Lich – Undead creature from fantasy literature
- Lugat – Vampire-like being in Albanian mythology
- Kukudh – Undead in Albanian mythology
- Nachzehrer – Revenant in German folklore
- Nav (Slavic folklore) – Concept in Slavic folklore
- Pocong – Javanese ghost from folklore
- Poltergeist – Ghost that causes physical disturbance
- Skeleton (undead) – Undead creature
- Strigoi – Vampires or troubled spirits from Romanian folklore
- Vampire – Mythical creature
- Vampire burial – Burial actions to prevent vampires from rising
- Vengeful ghost – Spirit of a dead person who returns from the afterlife to seek revenge
- Wiedergänger – German revenant folklore
- Zombie – Undead being from Haitian folklore and horror fiction
