= Draugr =

Undead creature from Norse mythology

Contemporary art depicting a draugr haunting in enormous hamr ("magical shape") by Kim Diaz Holm

Contemporary art depicting a sea draugr in Norwegian folklore by Kim Diaz Holm

In Nordic folklore, the draugr, or draug (Old Norse: draugr; Icelandic: draugur; Faroese: dreygur; Norwegian: draug, drauv; Swedish: drög, dröger; Northern Sami: rávga), (Note: Draug also exists in Swedish as a loanword from Icelandic sagas. In Danish, the loans from Icelandic are drauge and dravge.) is an archaic term for a malevolent revenant with varying ambiguous traits. In modern times, they are often portrayed as Norse supernatural zombies, loosely based on the draugr as described in early medieval Icelandic sagas. However, in myth and folklore, they comprise several complex ideas which change from story to story, especially in surviving Norwegian folklore, where the draugr remains a staple – see § Norwegian folklore.

In the Icelandic sagas, from which most modern interest is garnered, draugs live in their graves or royal palaces, often guarding treasure buried in their burial mound. They are foremost tangible, akin to animated corpses, but also supernatural with varying abilities, akin to ghosts.

== Etymology ==
=== Development ===
The Old Norse word draugr (initially draugʀ, see ʀ), in the sense of the undead creature, is hypothetically traced to an unrecorded Proto-Germanic: *draugaz, meaning "delusion, illusion, mirage" etc., from *dreuganą ("to mislead, deceive"), ultimately from a Proto-Indo European stem *dʰrowgʰos ("phantom"), from *dʰréwgʰ-s ~ dʰrugʰ-és ("deceive"), ultimately from the same root as 'dream', from a Proto-Indo European *dʰrowgʰ-mos ("deceit, illusion").

Cognates includes Swedish: bedraga ("to deceive"), Low German: drog ("impostor, scoundrel"), dregen ("to deceive"), Old High German: bitrog ("delusion"), gitrog ("illusion, mirage, ghost"), German: Trug ("deception, delusion, illusion"), Dutch: bedrog ("deceit, deception"), Old Saxon: gidrog ("delusion"), Welsh: drwg (/druug/, "bad, evil"), Irish: droch ("bad, evil"), drouk ("bad, evil"), Sanskrit: द्रुह्, drúh ("injury, harm, offence"), द्रोघ, drógha ("deceitful, untrue, misleading"), Old Persian: 𐎭𐎼𐎢𐎥, drauga ("deceit, deception"), 𐎭𐎼𐎢𐎩𐎴, draujana ("deceptive, deceitful, misleading").

=== Descendants ===
Recorded descendants of draugr include:

- Faroese: dreygur
- Icelandic: draugur
- Norwegian: draug, drøg, drog, also the forms: drauv, drøv, drov, in 1741 recorded as: drau (cf. Insular Scots: drow)
- Scanian: dråe, dråker, dråkel: "devil"; definite forms: drån, dronn, dröken: "the devil"
- Swedish: drög, dröger, draugr

Descendants of draugr also exist in Shetlandic and Orcadian dialect, stemming from Insular Scots, which ultimately got it from an unrecorded Norn: *drau, or *drog (cf. 18th century Norwegian: drau → drov), but also being effected by Norn: trǫll ("troll") by linguistic and figurative convergence; Norn being the Old Norse descendant spoken in the Northern Isles and Caithness until the early modern period:

- Insular Scots: drow, trow: "malignant spirit, troll, gnome"
- Shetland dialect: drow, trow: "malignant spirit, ghost; troll, gnome, huldufólk"
- Orcadian dialect: drow, trow: "malignant spirit, troll, gnome, the devil" (cf. Scanian descendants: "devil, the devil")

Cognates of the draugr also exist in the Sámi languages (reconstructed Proto-Samic: *rāvkë, *rāvkkē), suggesting a common loan from Proto-Norse.

- Southern Sami: raavke: vision, ghost
- Pite Sami: rávvga: analogous to the § Norwegian draugr
- Lule Sami: rávgga: analogous to the § Norwegian draugr
- Northern Sami: rávga, or čáhcerávga ("water rávga"): analogous to the § Norwegian draugr
- Kildin Sami: роа̄ввк (rååvvk): geist; phantom, vision

Similarly, the reconstructed Proto-Finnic: *raukka may also (at least partially) derive from the same root as Old Norse: draugr and the Sámi cognates:

- Estonian: rauk: a very old person
- Finnish: raukka: poor thing, wretch; coward, wimp
- Votic: raukkõ: poor thing, wretch

Such may also be effected by Swedish: rackare, "someone dealing with cleaning filth", such as a gravedigger, execution assistant, skinner, castrator, chimney sweeper, etc., also being derogatory to some degree, meaning "blighter, gypsy, the devil", from Middle Low German: racker with similar meaning (related to "rake"). Other potentially related words to either case includes: Danish: drog ("a good-for-nothing"); Scots: draighie, draich, draick ("a lazy, lumpish, useless person"), draich ("slow, spiritless"); Swedish: drög ("nut, idiot").

== Terminology ==
=== Nonfiction literature ===
One of the earliest nonfiction literature to mention the draugr is by Danish-Norwegian Hans Egede (1686–1758), during his time as the bishop of Greenland. In his book, The New Perlustration of Greenland (Danish: Det gamle Grønlands nye Perlustration), published in 1741, he describes the Norwegian myth of the Kraken, and follows up with a comment of the sea draugr:

De fortælle endnu om et andet søe-trold og spøgelse, som de kalde drauen, samme skal ingen viis gestalt eller skribelse have; men lader sig see nu i en nu i en anden positur. (Note: Extrapolating the text from the old font is hard and thus the Danish text might include errors. The old language also makes identifying potential errors hard.)

Translation:

"They also tell of another sea troll and spectre, which they call drauen (the drow), which is said to have no specified form or description; but shows itself in one or another appearance."

=== Dictionaries ===
One of the earliest dictionaries for draugr, or rather its descendants, was Swedish linguist and priest Johan Ernst Rietz's (1815–1868) dialect dictionary of Swedish vernacular (1862–1867), which listed the Swedish descendants of Old Norse draugr as dröger and drög (cf. Icelandic: draugur vs dröger, Norwegian: drøg vs drög), including the Old Norse form draugr in the province of Närke. He also included Norwegian draug, drauv and drog for comparison, giving the definition for both Swedish and Norwegian as:

"pale, powerless, slow human, striding forward", alternatively in Närke, akin to Old Norse, just "ghost or undead".

Around the same time, although published a few years later, English philologist Richard Cleasby (1797–1847), and Icelandic scholar Guðbrandur Vigfússon (1827–1889), in "An Icelandic-English dictionary" (1873), defined Old Norse draugr as:

"a ghost, spirit, especially the dead inhabitant of a cairn"

This description was repeated almost word for word by Icelandic linguist Geir T. Zoëga (1857–1928), in his book "A concise dictionary of old Icelandic" (1910).

Norwegian journalist, author, and editor Johan Christian Johnsen (1815–1898), in his Norwegian dictionary (1881–1888), gave a different, more specific definition for Norwegian draug than Rietz did in the 1860s, defining it as:

"(really a revenant) in Norwegian folk superstition, a supernatural being that dwells on and by the sea. It appears most frequently as a man dressed in sea clothes with a bundle of seaweed instead of a head, sailing in half a boat, always proclaiming that the person or someone from the boat to whom it appears will perish".

=== Written corpus ===
In the written corpus, the draugr is regarded not so much as a ghost, but a corporeal undead creature, or revenant, i.e., the reanimated corpse of the deceased, for example inside the burial mound or grave (as in the example of Kárr inn gamli in Grettis saga). Commentators extend the term draugr to the undead in medieval literature, even if it is never explicitly referred to as such in the text, and designated them instead as a haugbúi ("barrow-dweller") or an aptrganga ("re-walker") – see Gjenganger (cf. Icelandic: afturganga, "after-walker"; Swedish: gengångare, "again-walker").

Unlike Kárr inn gamli (Kar the Old) in Grettis saga, who is specifically called a draugr, (Note: Kárr is called a draugr by Grettir when he sings a verse to reply to the question of how he gained the treasure sword. This was rendered "In the barrow where that thing .. fell" in the 1869 translation, and "in a murky mound.. a ghost was felled then " by Scudder.) Glámr the ghost in the same saga is never explicitly called a draugr in the text, though called a "troll" in it. (Note: Ármann Jakobsson notes that in this and comparable instances, the term "troll" designates some sort of revenant, more specifically the human undead. Since the term can also mean 'demon', the sense is ambiguous.) Yet Glámr is still routinely referred to as a draugr by modern scholars. (Note: Clemoes & Dickins (1959), p. 190, e.g., and Willam Sayers) Beings not specifically called draugr, but only referred to as aptrgǫngur "revenants" (pl. of aptrganga) and reimleikar "haunting" in these medieval sagas, (Note: Besides Glámr, other examples are Víga-Hrappr Sumarliðason in Laxdæla saga; Þórólfr bægifótr (lame-foot) or the ghosts of Fróðá in Eyrbyggja saga.) are still commonly discussed as a draugr in various scholarly works, or the draugr and the haugbúi are lumped into one.

A further caveat is that the application of the term draugr may not necessarily follow what the term might have meant in the strict sense during medieval times, but rather follow a modern definition or notion of draugr, specifically such ghostly beings (by whatever names they are called) that occur in Icelandic folktales categorized as "Draugasögur" in Jón Árnason's collection, based on the classification groundwork laid by Konrad Maurer. (Note: It is pointed out that the lexicographer Guðbrandur Vigfússon (who defined draugr as 'ghost' in his dictionary) wrote the preface to Jón Árnason's folklore collection.)

In Old Norse, draugr also meant a tree trunk or dry dead wood (then a cognate of "drought", related to "drain"), which in poetry could refer to a man or warrior, since Old Norse poetry often used terms for trees to represent humans, especially in kennings, referencing the myth that the god Odin and his brothers created the first humans Ask and Embla from trees. There was thus a connection between the idea of a felled tree's trunk and that of a dead man's corpse. Similarly, the term kraki (Norwegian: krake, Swedish: krake) can refer to a branchy tree, as well as a meager creature, such as a corpse.

Also, one of the names for Odin was Draugadróttinn, "Lord of the draugr", in the Ynglinga saga, chapter 7.

=== Mound dweller (haugbúi) ===
Haugbúi (Danish: højbo, Norwegian: haugbonde, Swedish: högbo) is a variation of the draugr. It means "mound dweller", i.e. the dead body living within its mound (tomb), compounding haugr ("mound"), also found in dialectal English as "how, howe" (related to "height"), and búi ("dweller, inhabitant, resident"), from búa ("dwell, reside, inhabit"), related to "by, be"; lit. 'howe-by:er'. The notable difference from a draug is that a mound dweller doesn't leave its grave site and only attacks those who trespass upon their territory.

Beings in British folklore such as Lincolnshire "shag-boy" and Scots "hogboon" derive their names from haugbui.

A modern rendering is also barrow-wight, popularized by J. R. R. Tolkien in his novels, however, initially used for the draugr in Eiríkur Magnússon's and William Morris' 1869 translation of Grettis saga, long before Tolkien employed the term; (Note: Burns citing Gilliver et al. (2009) [2006]. The Ring of Words: Tolkien and the Oxford English Dictionary, pp. 214–216.) rendering Icelandic "Sótti haugbúinn með kappi" as "the barrow-wight setting on with hideous eagerness".

=== Troll ===
The term draugr is partially synonymous with troll, and both share many similarities and features in older folklore. Rather than the modern depiction of monstrous humanoids with big noses, trolls were originally rather esoteric malevolent supernatural beings, by analogy synonymous with 'demon, devil, and thereof malignant spirits', including ghosts, but also branching into the concept of esoteric fairytale races, like jötunns and hidden people/troll-folk, etc. For comparison, the word "troll" is part of one of the common words for magic in the Nordic languages: "troll-dom" (Old Norse: trolldómr, Danish: trolddom, Norwegian: trolldom, Swedish: trolldom).

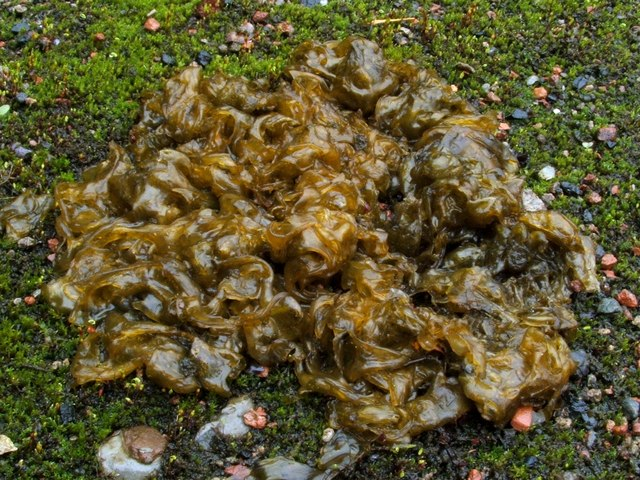
The algae species nostoc commune, historically called draugspy ("draug puke") in Norway, and trollspy ("troll puke") in Götaland, Sweden

Examples of direct draug/troll synonymity: the algae species nostoc commune have historically carried the name draugspy ("draug puke") in Norway, and trollspy ("troll puke") in Götaland, Sweden; and the Norwegian sea draugr have historically often been called a "sea troll". The synonymity have been noted by scholars already in the Old Norse written corpus, such as Grettis saga, where Glámr the ghost is called a "troll", but not a draugr, despite showing similarities to Kárr the old, which is called a draugr. Glámr, in spite of this, is still routinely referred to as a draugr by modern scholars. (Note: Clemoes & Dickins (1959), p. 190, e.g., and Willam Sayers) Icelandic scholar Ármann Jakobsson notes that in this and comparable instances, the term "troll" designates some sort of revenant, or more specifically the human undead, and since the term can also mean "demon", the sense is ambiguous.

The notion of draugrs who live in mountains, akin to trolls, is present in Norwegian poetry, such as Henrik Ibsen's (1828–1906) Peer Gynt, and works of Aasmund Olavsson Vinje (1818–1870), but also in Faroese folklore, where the dreygur share many traits seen in later troll-lore, such as inhabiting mountains and hills, and described as large, strong creatures with pale skin and long, dark hair, and often depicted as being cannibalistic. Further comparisons can be made to English derivatives of § mound dweller: the Lincolnshire "shag-boy", Caithness-Orkneyan "hogboon", and Shetland "hjogfinni", which have been compared to goblins and brownies, but also old Nordic traditions of the dead and mountains.

Northern Isle descendants, drow and trow, mainly refer to a race of folkloric beings, cognate to the Nordic trolls, wights, and gnomes, and further, in Shetland, analog to the concept of the hidden people (also referred to as "troll-folk") in Nordic folklore, a loose race or conglomeration of fairies, wights, gnomes, or trolls, etc., who live underground in an analog plane of existence, who may appear and disappear at will. It is thought that the form trow stems from L-vocalization of Norn: troll, and then intermixing with drow via linguistic and figurative convergence. However, the sense of "ghost" also survives in Shetland.

The sense of "devil", or "the devil" (Satan), survive sporadically as well. Scanian indefinite descendants: dråe, dråker, dråkel, mean "devil", while some forms only survive in definite form: drån, dronn, dröken, meaning "the devil". In Orkney, the descendant drow can also be used to refer to "the devil".

== Icelandic sagas ==
The Icelandic sagas are the earliest written material of draugr en masse, describing draugr as dangerous corporeal undead which protect their burial mounds. They have magical abilities and can shapeshift, including changing size and mass.

One of the best-known revenants in the sagas is Glámr, who is defeated by the hero in Grettis saga. After Glámr dies on Christmas Eve, "people became aware that Glámr was not resting in peace. He wrought such havoc that some people fainted at the sight of him, while others went out of their minds". After a battle, Grettir eventually gets Glámr on his back. Just before Grettir kills him, Glámr curses Grettir because "Glámr was endowed with more evil force than most other ghosts", and thus he was able to speak and leave Grettir with his curse after his death. Do note, however, that the saga does not actually use the term draugr for Glámr.

A somewhat ambivalent, alternative view of the draugr is presented by the example of Gunnar Hámundarson in Njáls saga: "It seemed as though the howe was agape, and that Gunnar had turned within the howe to look upwards at the moon. They thought that they saw four lights within the howe, but not a shadow to be seen. Then they saw that Gunnar was merry, with a joyful face."

In the Eyrbyggja saga, a shepherd is assaulted by a blue-black draugr. The shepherd's neck is broken during the ensuing scuffle. The shepherd rises the next night as a draugr.

=== Physical traits ===
Modern depiction of a Norse warrior turned draugr

The draugr has been explained as a "corporeal ghost" with a physical, tangible body, and not an "imago". In tales, it is often delivered a "second death" by the destruction of the animated corpse.

"The will appears to be strong, strong enough to draw the hugr [animate will] back to one's body. These reanimated individuals were known as draugr. However, though the dead might live again, they could also die again. Draugrs die a "second death" as Chester Gould calls it, when their bodies decay, are burned, dismembered or otherwise destroyed".

Draugrs usually possess superhuman strength, and are said to be "generally hideous to look at", bearing a necrotic black or blue color, and being associated with a "reek of decay" (a common trait in ghostlore), or more precisely, inhabited haunts that often issued foul stench.

In the Old Icelandic sagas, Draugrs were said to be either hel-blár ("death-blue") or nár-fölr ("corpse-pale"). Glámr in Grettis saga, when found dead, was described as "blár sem Hel en digr sem naut (black as hell and bloated to the size of a bull)". (Note: The color is literally 'blue', thus "blue as hell, and great as a neat" is the rendering in Eiríkur Magnússon & Morris (trr.) (1869), p. 99.) Þórólfr Lame-foot, when lying dormant, looked "uncorrupted" and also "was black as death [ie, bruised black and blue] and swollen to the size of an ox". The close similarity of these descriptions have been noted. Laxdæla saga describes how bones were dug up belonging to a dead sorceress who had appeared in dreams, and they were "blue and evil looking".

Þráinn (Thrain), the berserker of Valland, "turned himself into a troll" in Hrómundar saga Gripssonar, was a fiend (dólgr) which was "black and huge.. roaring loudly and blowing fire", and possessed long scratching claws, and the claws stuck in the neck, prompting the hero Hrómundr to refer to the draugur as a sort of cat (Old Norse: kattakyn). The possession of long claws features also in the case of another revenant, Ásviðr (Aswitus) who came to life in the night and attacked his foster-brother Ásmundr (Asmundus) with them, scratching his face and tearing one of his ears. (Note: As related by Saxo Grammaticus, hence the Latinized names.)

Draugrs often give off a morbid stench, not unlike the smell of a decaying body. The mound where Kárr the Old was entombed reeked horribly. In Harðar saga Hörðr Grímkelsson's two underlings die even before entering Sóti the Viking's mound, due to the "gust and stink (ódaun)" wafting out of it. (Note: Also Þráinn's " barrow was filled with a horrible stench" in Hrómundar saga Gripssonar.) When enraged Þráinn filled the barrow with an "evil reek."

=== Magical abilities ===
Draugrs are noted for having numerous magical abilities resembling those of living witches and wizards, such as hamr-shifting (shapeshifting in Nordic folklore), controlling the weather, and seeing into the future. This magic is referred to as Old Norse: trollskapr (lit. 'troll-ship', roughly "sorcery-ness"), (Note: The prefix, Old Norse: troll-, which is the same word as the creature troll, which initially meant something akin to "malevolent esoteric supernatural being" (demon, devil, ghost, jötunn etc.), is by extension, specifically in compounds, also a word for the sorcery and dark arts of said beings; cf. Swedish: trolla ("to perform sorcery"), trolleri ("sorcery"), trollkarl (lit. 'troll-man', "sorcerer"), trollgumma, trollpacka (lit. 'troll-lady', "witch"),) which Icelandic linguist Geir T. Zoëga (1857–1928), defined as: "nature of a troll, witchcraft". The Swedish Academy expands on this for their description of the Swedish cognate: trollskap:

(ability or power to exercise) witchcraft/sorcery; also of (especially evil) action arising from such ability, etc.; earlier also concretely, about objects or tools and the like equipped with or produced by such ability and so on... (Note: Synonyms to trollskapr and trollskap include: Old Icelandic: trolldómr and Swedish: trolldom, Swedish: trollkonst and trollkraft etc. ("sorcery").)

==== Shapeshifting and transforming ====
Draugrs are said to be able to shapeshift, as well as supernaturally affect their surroundings and presence, both common traits in Nordic folklore. They could change their size as well as their mass, and they could create temporary darkness in daylight hours.

The undead Víga-Hrappr Sumarliðason of Laxdaela saga, unlike the typical guardian of a treasure hoard, does not stay put in his burial place but roams around his farmstead of Hrappstaðir, menacing the living. Víga-Hrappr's ghost, it has been suggested, was capable of transforming into the seal with human-like eyes which appeared before Þorsteinn svarti/surt (Thorsteinn the Black) sailing by ship, and was responsible for the sinking of the vessel to prevent the family from reaching Hrappstaðir. The ability to shapeshift has been ascribed to Icelandic ghosts generally, particularly into the shape of a seal.

A draugr in Icelandic folktales collected in the modern age can also change into a great flayed bull, a grey horse with a broken back but no ears or tail, and a cat that would sit upon a sleeper's chest and grow steadily heavier until their victim suffocated. Very similar motifs are also found for other mythical creatures in Nordic folklore, such as the mare, who sits on a sleeper's chest to suffocate them, and also often travels in "cat shape", or nixies, which is also said to sometimes appear as a black or white bull, horse, dog, cat, or gnome, etc. The horse motif is also found in Britain, see water horse.

==== Transcending abilities ====
The draugr's presence might be shown by a great light that glowed from the mound like foxfire. This fire would form a barrier between the land of the living and that of the dead.

The undead Víga-Hrappr Sumarliðason of Laxdaela saga exhibited the ability to sink into the ground and "swim" through the solid rock to escape from Óláfr Hǫskuldsson the Peacock.

Draugrs also have the ability to enter into the dreams of the living, and they will frequently leave a gift behind so that "the living person may be assured of the tangible nature of the visit". The ability to manifest one's self out of body, such as in a dream, is a trait found in heathen witchcraft and Nordic hamr folklore, such as in the story of Bödvar Bjarki, whose mind manifests into a bear outside his body, but also many mythological creatures, like (night)mares, and haunting ghosts.

==== Cursing ====
Draugrs have the ability to curse, as shown in Grettis saga, where Grettir is cursed to be unable to become stronger. Draugrs also brought disease to a village and can also kill people with bad luck.

=== Vampiric traits ===
The draugr has been conceived of as a type of vampire by folktale anthologist Andrew Lang in late 1897, with the idea further pursued by more modern commentators. The focus here is not on blood-sucking, which is not attested for the draugr, but rather, contagiousness or transmittable nature of vampirism, that is to say, how a vampire begets another by turning his or her attack victim into one of his kind. Sometimes the chain of contagion becomes an outbreak, e.g., the case of Þórólfr bægifótr (Thorolf Lame-foot or Twist-Foot), and even called an "epidemic" regarding Þórgunna (Thorgunna). (Note: Both these occur in the Eyrbyggja saga.)

A more speculative case of vampirism is that of Glámr, who was asked to tend sheep for a haunted farmstead and was subsequently found dead with his neck and every bone in his body broken. (Note: Note similarity to a shepherd killed by Thorolf's ghost, also found with every bone broken.) It has been surmised by commentators that Glámr, by "contamination," was turned into an undead (draugr) by whatever being was haunting the farm.

=== Greed and bloodthirst ===
Any mean, nasty, or greedy person can become a draugr. As Ármann Jakobsson notes, "most medieval Icelandic ghosts are evil or marginal people. If not dissatisfied or evil, they are unpopular".

The draugr's motivation was primarily envy and greed. Greed causes it to attack any would-be grave robbers viciously, but the draugr also expresses an innate envy of the living stemming from a longing for the things of life which it once had. They also exhibit an immense and nearly insatiable appetite, as shown in the encounter of Aran and Asmund, sword brothers who swore that, if one died, the other would sit vigil with him for three days inside the burial mound. When Aran died, Asmund brought his possessions into the barrow—banners, armor, hawk, hound, and horse—then set himself to wait the three days:

During the first night, Aran got up from his chair and killed the hawk and hound and ate them. On the second night he got up again from his chair, and killed the horse and tore it into pieces; then he took great bites at the horse-flesh with his teeth, the blood streaming down from his mouth all the while he was eating…. The third night Asmund became very drowsy, and the first thing he knew, Aran had got him by the ears and torn them off.

The draugr's victims were not limited to trespassers in its home. The roaming undead devastated livestock by running the animals to death either by riding them or pursuing them in some hideous, half-flayed form. Shepherds' duties kept them outdoors at night, and they were particular targets for the hunger and hatred of the undead:

The oxen which had been used to haul Thorolf's body were ridden to death by demons, and every single beast that came near his grave went raving mad and howled itself to death. The shepherd at Hvamm often came racing home with Thorolf after him. One day that Fall neither sheep nor shepherd came back to the farm.

Animals feeding near the grave of a draugr might be driven mad by the creature's influence. They may also die from being driven mad. Thorolf, for example, caused birds to drop dead when they flew over his bowl barrow.

=== Vulnerability ===
Draugrs prefer to be active during the night, although they did not appear vulnerable to sunlight like some other revenants.

Some draugrs are resistant or immune to weapons, and only a hero has the strength and courage to stand up to such a formidable opponent. In legends, since weapons would do no good, the hero often wrestled a draugr back to his grave to defeat them. A good example of this is found in Hrómundar saga Gripssonar. Iron could injure a draugr, as with many supernatural creatures, although it would not be sufficient to stop it.

Sometimes, the hero must dispose of the body in unconventional ways. The preferred method is to cut off the draugr's head, burn the body, and dump the ashes in the sea—the emphasis being on making sure that the draugr was dead and gone.

=== Prevention and destruction ===
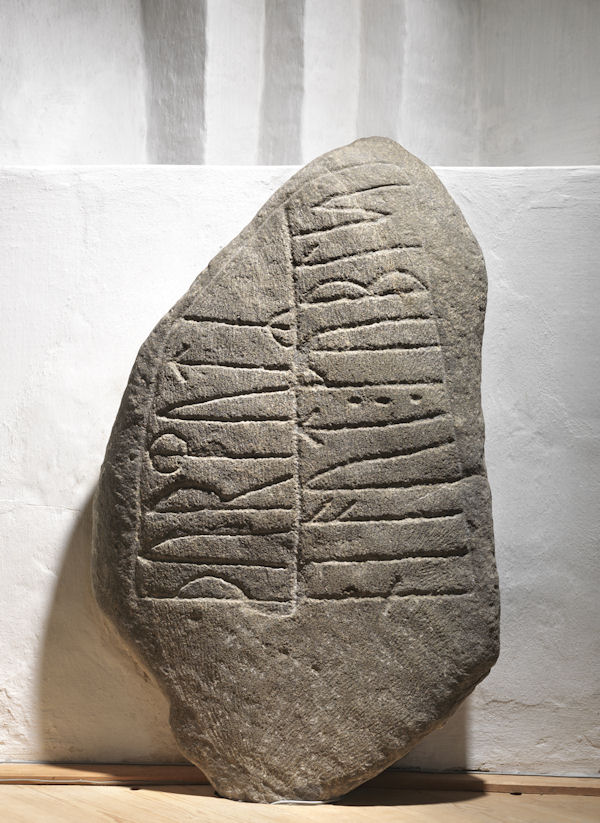
The Nørre Nærå Runestone is interpreted as having a "grave binding inscription" used to keep the deceased in its grave.

The main indication that a deceased person will become a draugr is that the corpse is not horizontal. It is found standing upright (as with Víga-Hrappr), or in a sitting position (Þórólfr), indicating that the dead might return. Ármann Jakobsson suggests further that breaking the draugr's posture is a necessary or helpful step in destroying the draugr, but this is fraught with the risk of being inflicted with the evil eye, whether this is explicitly told in the case of Grettir who receives the curse from Glámr, or only implied in the case of Þórólfr, whose son warns the others to beware while they unbend Þórólfr's seated posture.

The draugr needing to be decapitated to hinder them from further hauntings is a common theme in the family sagas.

Traditionally in Iceland, a pair of open iron scissors was placed on the chest of the recently deceased, and straws or twigs might be hidden among their clothes. The big toes were tied together or needles were driven through the soles of the feet to keep the dead from being able to walk. Tradition also held that the coffin should be lifted and lowered in three directions as it was carried from the house to confuse a possible draugr's sense of direction.

The most effective means of preventing the return of the dead was believed to be a corpse door, a special door through which the corpse was carried feet-first with people surrounding it so that the corpse could not see where it was going. The door was then bricked up to prevent a return. It is speculated that this belief began in Denmark and spread throughout the Norse culture, founded on the idea that the dead could only leave through the way they entered.

In the "Eyrbyggja saga," draugrs are driven off by holding a "door-doom." One by one, they are summoned to the door-doom, given judgment, and forced out of the home by this legal method. The home is then purified with holy water to ensure that they never come back.

== Faroese folklore ==
In Faroese folklore, the draugr (Faroese: dreygur) is said to be a type of undead being that inhabits the mountains and hills of the Faroe Islands. It is typically described as a large, strong creature with pale skin and long, dark hair. It is often depicted as being cannibalistic.

== Norwegian folklore ==
In contrast to the Icelandic sagas, in later Scandinavian folklore (Norway, Sweden), the term draugr is described akin to spirits, ghosts or revenants in general, sometimes with no clear distinction at all. In Norway, however, the term draugr (Norwegian: draug, drøg, drog, and drauv, drøv, drov), beyond meaning revenant in general, have also taken on a specific sense of revenants of people lost at sea, sometimes specified as "sea draugr" (Norwegian: havdraug, sjødraug) relative to "land draugr". A similar motif can be seen in the Sami tradition, but with inland bodies of water.

=== Sea draugr ===
A "draug" from modern Scandinavian folklore aboard a ship, in sub-human form, wearing oilskins

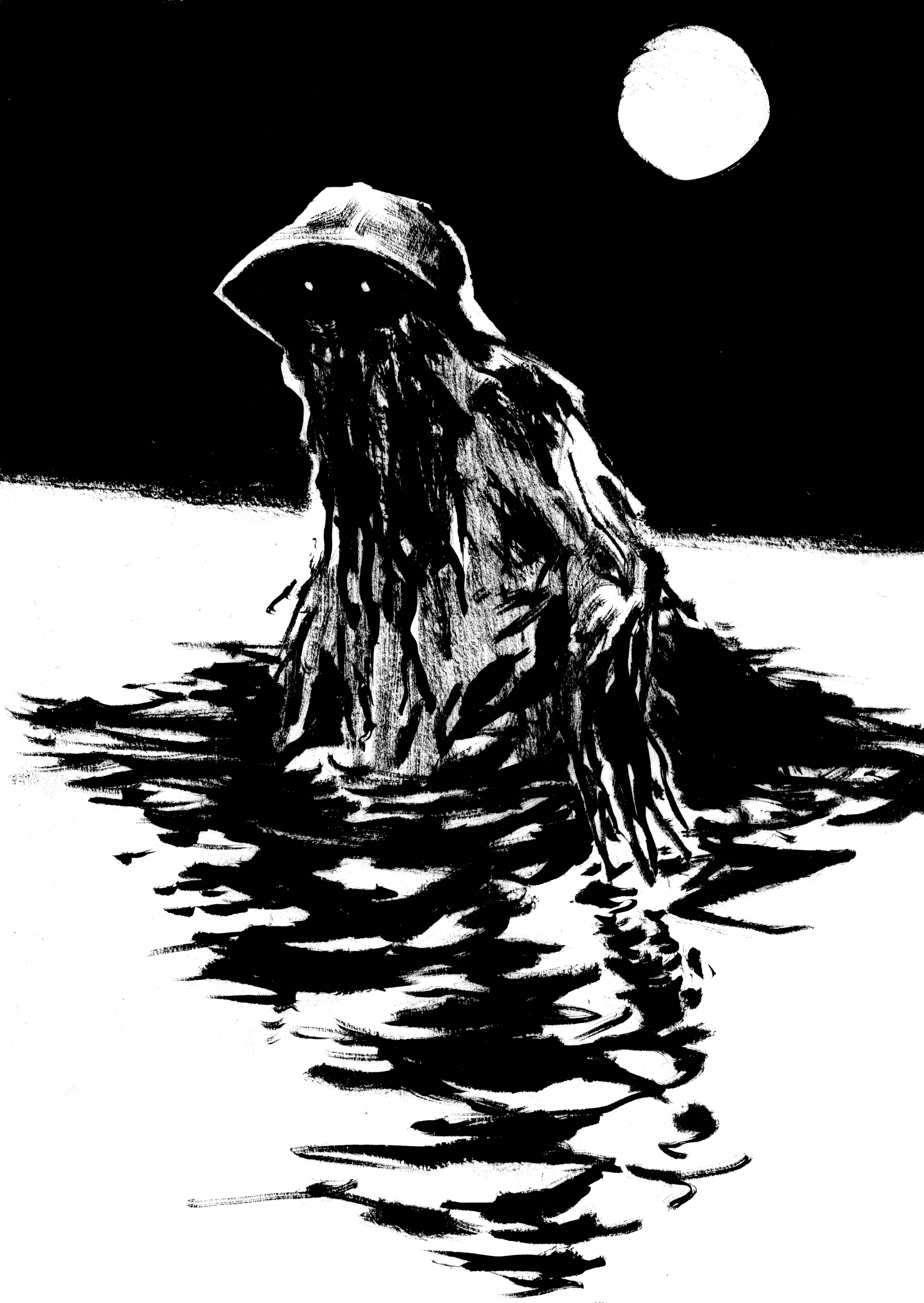
The sea draugr by Kim Diaz Holm (2014)

The sea draugr (Norwegian: havdraug, sjødraug) occurs in legends along the coast of Norway, either at sea or along the beach. Such have also variously been called "sea troll" (sjøtroll), among others, then in the older sense of "evil malevolent being" or spectre, as opposed to the modern sense of a specific fairy tale creature.

One of the earliest recordings of the sea draugr was by Norwegian priest Hans Egede, who mentioned it in passing when writing about the Norwegian "kraken" in the early 18th century. He wrote that kraken fell under the general category of "sea spectre" (Danish: søe-trold og [søe]-spøgelse, "sea trolls and sea spooks"), adding that "the Drow" (Drauen, definite form of drau, cf. drauv) was another being within that sea spectre classification.

"They also tell of another sea troll and spectre, which they call drauen (the drow), which is said to have no specified form or description; but shows itself in one or another appearance." (Note: Danish quote: De fortælle endnu om et andet søe-trold og spøgelse, som de kalde drauen, samme skal ingen viis gestalt eller skribelse have; men lader sig see nu i en nu i en anden positur. Extrapolating the text from the old font is hard and thus the Danish text might include errors. The old language also makes identifying potential errors hard.)

In later folklore, it became common to limit the figure to a ghost of a dead fisherman who had drifted at sea and who was not buried in Christian soil. It was said that he wore a leather jacket or was dressed in oilskin, but had a bundle of seaweed for his head. He sailed in a half-boat with blocked sails (Bø Municipality in Norway has the half-boat in its coat of arms) and announced death for those who saw him or even wanted to pull them down. This trait is common in the northernmost part of Norway, where life and culture was based on fishing more than anywhere else. The reason for this may be that the fishermen often drowned in great numbers, and the stories of restless dead coming in from sea were more common in the north than any other region of the country.

A recorded legend from Trøndelag tells how a corpse lying on a beach became the object of a quarrel between the two types of draug (headless and seaweed-headed). A similar source even tells of a third type, the gleip, known to hitch themselves to sailors walking ashore and make them slip on the wet rocks.

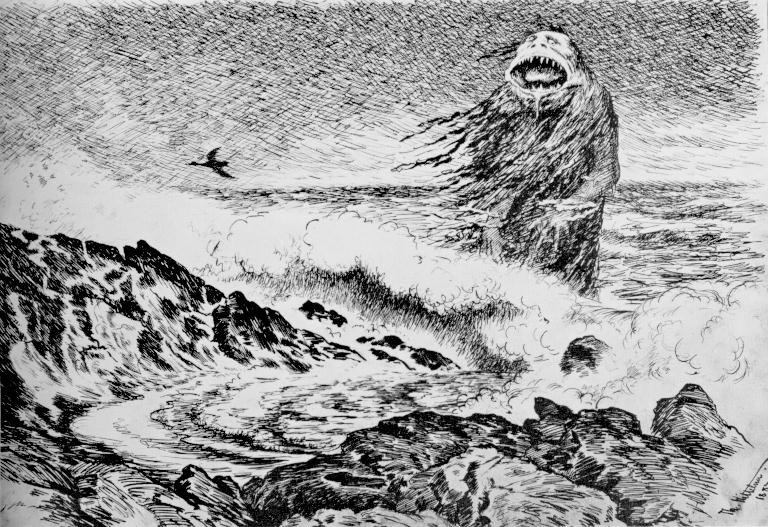
"The Sea Troll", Sjøtrollet, by Theodor Kittelsen (1887)

The modern and popular connection between the draug and the sea can be traced back to authors like Jonas Lie and Regine Nordmann, whose works include several books of fairy tales, as well as the drawings of Theodor Kittelsen, who spent some years living in Svolvær. Up north, the tradition of sea draugr is especially vivid.

=== Land draugr ===
The land dwelling draugrs of Norwegian folklore are essentially just the regular dead, i.e. revenants. Arne Garborg (1851–1924) describes land-draugrs as coming "fresh from the graveyards" in his poetry collection Haugtussa from 1895, and the term draugr is even used of vampires, in the sense that they are revenants. Norwegian philologist Ola Raknes (1887–1975) translated English "vampire" into Nynorsk as "blood-sucking draugr" (blodsugar-draug) in his English to Norwegian dictionary from 1927.

The notion of draugrs who live in the mountains is present in the poetic works of Henrik Ibsen (1828–1906), such as Peer Gynt, and Aasmund Olavsson Vinje (1818–1870). A comparison can be made to the § Faroese draugr, § mound dweller, as well as mountain trolls, and old Nordic traditions of the dead and mountains.

One of Vinje's poems, Det fyrste du har å gjera (1858), goes:

- Det fyrste du har å gjera, Mann,
- det er å døy,
- når ikkje du længer elska kan
- den fagre Møy.
- For då er det ute med spræke Gut
- og Mannes Værd,
- for då er Livet alt brunni ut,
- det Oske er.
- Og derfor stødt som det beste galdt
- eit Hjartelag,
- Og derfor Mannen han elskar alt
- til Døyan Dag,
- Og lever der Nokon, som ikkje Liv
- af Kjærleik saug,
- då gjeng han atter og sviv og sviv
- som bleike Draug.

Translation:

- The first thing you have to do, Man,
- is to die,
- when you no longer can love
- the beautiful Maiden.
- For then it is over with the eloquent Boy
- and the worth of Man,
- for then Life is all burned out,
- what Ashes are.
- And therefore struck as the best thing,
- a heart beat,
- And therefore the Man he loves all
- until the Day of Death,
- And does Anyone live there, who does not live
- of Love's thurst,
- then he walks beyond and swivel and swivel
- like the bleek Draugr.

=== Christmas culture ===
Both the sea draugr and land draugr have ties with the Norwegian Christmas tradition, in turn related to the broader Nordic Christmas tradition involving taking care of the dead as they visit their relatives during the festivities, and beyond. The old Nordic Christmas tradition of leaving out food and beer on Christmas night, as to welcome spirits of the deceased, household spirits and thereof, into the house, includes draugrs in Norway; the beer left out being called "draug-beer" (Norwegian: drøv-øl)(compare the US tradition of leaving milk and cookies for Santa Claus).

Sea draugrs and drowned people are also mentioned as being part of the Wild Hunt in Norway.

Modern art of the Christmas story, by Norwegian artist Kim Diaz Holm (den unge herr Holm), depicting the ghosts (land draugs) fighting off the sea draug

Although the sea draug usually presages death, there is an amusing account in Northern Norway of a northerner who managed to outwit him on Christmas:

It was Christmas Eve, and Ola went down to his boathouse to get the keg of brandy he had bought for the holidays. When he got in, he noticed a draugr sitting on the keg, staring out to sea. Ola, with great presence of mind and great bravery (it might not be amiss to state that he already had done some drinking), tiptoed up behind the draugr and struck him sharply in the small of the back, so that he went flying out through the window, with sparks hissing around him as he hit the water. Ola knew he had no time to lose, so he set off at a great rate, running through the churchyard which lay between his home and the boathouse. As he ran, he cried, "Up, all you Christian souls, and help me!" Then he heard the sound of fighting between the ghosts and the draugr, who were battling each other with coffin boards and bunches of seaweed. The next morning, when people came to church, the whole yard was strewn with coffin covers, boat boards, and seaweed. After the fight, which the ghosts won, the draugr never came back to that district.

== Sámi folklore ==
Cognates of the draugr also exist in Sámi folkore (Southern Sami: raavke; Pite Sami: rávvga; Lule Sami: rávgga; Northern Sami: rávga; Kildin Sami: роа̄ввк, roāvvk), suggesting a common loan from Proto-Norse.

In Southern Sami (spoken in Central Scandinavia), and Kildin Sámi (spoken on the Kola Peninsula of northwestern Russia), the cognates are said to mean vision, phantom, ghost, geist, which is analog to the Swedish cognates.

In Pite Sami, Lule Sami, and Northern Sami, the cognates are more analog to the Norwegian sea draugr, in Northern Sami also called čáhcerávga (lit. 'water rávga'). They are said to be the shadows of drowned people, living in a lake or stream. They were considered very dangerous, as they tried to pull the living into the water. Akin to other stories, they can shapeshift, and may turn into a big fish such as a pike, or other marine animal, like a seal. Akin to the nixie in Nordic folklore, these stories are used like a boogieman to scare children from visiting potentially dangerous water areas.

== Use in popular culture ==
The exoplanet PSR B1257+12 A has been named "Draugr".

=== Literature ===
The Nynorsk translation of The Lord of the Rings used the term for both Nazgûl and the dead men of Dunharrow. Tolkien's barrow-wight bears obvious similarity to, and was inspired by the haugbúi. The barrow-wight in turn influenced the "wights" commonly found in fantasy fiction.

=== Video games ===
In video game series such as The Elder Scrolls, draugr are the undead mummified corpses of fallen warriors that inhabit the ancient burial sites of a Nordic-inspired race of man. They first appeared in the Bloodmoon expansion to The Elder Scrolls III: Morrowind, and would later go on to appear all throughout The Elder Scrolls V: Skyrim.

Draugrs are a common enemy, the first encountered by the player, in the 2018 video game God of War, with a variety of different powers and abilities.

In 2019, a spaceship named Draugur was added to the game Eve Online, as the command destroyer of the Triglavian faction. Draugr appear as an enemies in the 2021 early access game Valheim, where they take the more recent, seaweed version of the Draug.

The Draugr is one of the Norse myth units of the New Gods Pack: Freyr DLC of 2024 video game Age of Mythology: Retold, associated to the god Ullr, fighting with bows and arrows.

=== Cinema ===
Season two episode two of the 2018 TV-series Hilda, entitled "The Draugen", involved draugen as the ghosts of sailors who died at sea. While their form was ghostly, the captain could wear a coat, and had a shock of seaweed for hair.

In the 2018 film Draug, a group of Viking warriors encounter the draugr while searching for a missing person inside a vast forest. The draugr are depicted as blue-black animated corpses wielding many magical abilities.

In the 2022 movie The Northman, Amleth enters a burial mound, in search of a magical sword named "Draugr". Amleth encounters an undead Mound Dweller inside the grave chamber, which he has to fight to obtain the blade.

The 2024 Icelandic horror film The Damned features a draugr tormenting the inhabitants of an isolated winter fishing post after they let the survivors of a shipwreck drown.

== See also ==
- Gjenganger
- Norse funeral
- Selkolla
- Spriggan
- Wiedergänger
- Zombies
