= Petar Blagojević =

Serbian peasant and alleged vampire (1662–1725)

- Петар Благојевић
- Born: c. 1662
- Died: 1725 (aged 62–63); Kingdom of Serbia, Habsburg monarchy
- Known for: Believed to become a Vampire
- Spouse: Ana Blagojević

Petar Blagojević (Serbian Cyrillic: Петар Благојевић, German: Peter Plogojowitz; died 1725) was a Serbian peasant who was believed to have become a vampire after his death and to have killed nine of his fellow villagers. It was one of the earliest, most sensational, and best-documented cases of vampire hysteria. It was described in the report of Imperial Provisor Ernst Frombald, an official of the Austrian monarchy, who witnessed the staking of Blagojević.

Scholars have noted the influence of Blagojević's case upon the development of the image of the modern vampire in Western popular culture.

== Case ==
Petar Blagojević lived in a village named Kisilova (possibly the modern-day town of Kisiljevo), in the part of Serbia that temporarily passed from Ottoman into Austrian hands after the Treaty of Passarowitz (1718) and was ceded back to the Ottomans with the Treaty of Belgrade (1739) (see Arnold Paole § Background for more details on the historical context). Blagojević died in 1725, and his death was followed by a spate of other sudden deaths (after very short maladies, reportedly of about 24 hours each). Within eight days, nine people perished. On their death-beds, the victims allegedly claimed to have been throttled by Blagojević at night. Furthermore, Blagojević's wife stated that he had visited her and asked her for his opanci (shoes); she then moved to another village for safety reasons. In other legends, it is said that Blagojević came back to his house demanding food from his son and, when the son refused, Blagojević brutally murdered him, probably via biting and drinking his blood. The villagers decided to disinter the body and examine it for signs of vampirism, such as growing hair, beard and nails, and the absence of decomposition.

The inhabitants of Kisilova demanded that Kameralprovisor Frombald, along with the local priest, should be present at the procedure as a representative of the administration. Frombald tried to convince them that permission from the Austrian authorities in Belgrade should be sought first. The locals declined because they feared that by the time the permission came, the whole community could be exterminated by the vampire, which they claimed had already happened "in Turkish times" (i.e. when the village was still in the Ottoman-controlled part of Serbia). They demanded that Frombald himself should immediately permit the procedure or else they would abandon the village to save their lives. Frombald was forced to consent.

Accompanied by the parish priest of Veliko Gradište, he viewed the already exhumed body and was astonished to find that the characteristics associated with vampires in local belief were indeed present. The body was undecomposed, the hair and beard were grown, there were "new skin and nails" (while the old ones had peeled away), and blood could be seen in the mouth. After that, the people, who "grew more outraged than distressed", proceeded to stake the body through the heart, which caused a great amount of "completely fresh" blood to flow through the ears and mouth of the corpse. Finally, the body was burned. Frombald concludes his report on the case with the request that, in case these actions were found to be wrong, he should not be blamed for them, as the villagers were "beside themselves with fear". The authorities apparently did not consider it necessary to take any measures regarding the incident.

The report on this event was among the first documented testimonies about vampire beliefs in Eastern Europe. It was published by Wienerisches Diarium, a Viennese newspaper, today known as Die Wiener Zeitung. Along with the report of the very similar Arnold Paole case of 1726–1732, it was widely translated West and North, contributing to the vampire craze of the eighteenth century in Germany, France and England. The strange phenomena or appearances that the Austrian officials witnessed have since been interpreted as forms of the natural process of the decomposition of the body.

=== Commentary ===
In De masticatione mortuorum in tumulis (1725), Michaël Ranft attempted to explain folk beliefs in vampires. He writes that, in the event of the death of every villager, some other person or people—most likely a person related to the first dead—who saw or touched the corpse, would eventually die either of some disease related to exposure to the corpse or of a frenetic delirium caused by the panic of merely seeing the corpse. These dying people would say that the dead man had appeared to them and tortured them in many ways. The other people in the village would exhume the corpse to see what it had been doing. He gives the following explanation when talking about the case of Petar Blagojević:

This brave man perished by a sudden or violent death. This death, whatever it is, can provoke in the survivors the visions they had after his death. Sudden death gives rise to inquietude in the familiar circle. Inquietude has sorrow as a companion. Sorrow brings melancholy. Melancholy engenders restless nights and tormenting dreams. These dreams enfeeble body and spirit until illness overcomes and, eventually, death.

— Michael Ranft, Tractat von dem Kauen und Schmatzen der Todten in Gräbern, Worin die wahre Beschaffenheit derer Hungarischen Vampyrs und Blut-Sauger gezeigt, Auch alle von dieser Materie bißher zum Vorschein gekommene Schrifften recensiret werden, § 51.

== See also ==
- Arnold Paole
- Sava Savanović
- Michael Ranft
- Treatise on the apparitions of Spirits and on Vampires or Revenants
- Mercy Brown vampire incident

== Sources ==
- Bunson, Matthew (1993). The Vampire Encyclopedia. London: Thames & Hudson. ISBN 0-500-27748-6.
- Frombald (1725). Copia eines Schreibens aus dem Gradisker District in Ungarn. (the original report in German), Kayserliche Hof-Buchdruckerey (a private english translation of the report)
- García Marín, Álvaro. "Imperial Provisor Frombald's First Name—Discovered." Journal of Vampire Studies 1, no. 1 (2020): 118–21. https://www.academia.edu/44742371.
- Nowosadtko, Jutta (2004). Der "Vampyrus Serviensis" und sein Habitat: Impressionen von der österreichischen Militärgränze. In: Militär und Gesellschaft in der Frühen Neuzeit. 8 (2004). Heft 2. Universitätsverlag Potsdam.
- Ranft, Michael (1728). De masticatione mortuorum in tumulis (aka De la mastication des morts dans leurs tombeaux or Tractat von dem Kauen und Schmatzen der Todten in Gräbern), Leipzig: Teubners' Buchladen
- Ruickbie, Leo, 'Vampire Autopsies', Fortean Times, 288 (Special Issue, 2012), 44-8
- Summers, Montague (2003). The Vampire in Europe 1929. Kessinger Publishing, 2003, ISBN 0-7661-3576-4
