= Arnold Paole =

Serbian hajduk who was believed to have become a vampire after his death

Arnold Paole (Arnont Paule in the original documents; an early German rendition of a Serbian name or nickname, perhaps Арнаут Павле / Arnaut Pavle; died c. 1726) was a Serbian hajduk who was believed to have become a vampire after his death, initiating an epidemic of supposed vampirism that killed at least 16 people in his native village of Meduegna (also rendered as Metwett; likely a German rendition of Serbian "Medveđa"), located at the West Morava river in Trstenik, Serbia.

Paole's case, similar to that of Petar Blagojević, became famous because of the direct involvement of the Austrian authorities and the documentation by Austrian physicians and officers, who confirmed the reality of vampires. Their report of the case was distributed in Western Europe and contributed to the spread of vampire belief among educated Europeans. The report and its significance for the subsequent 18th-century vampire controversy are now sometimes explained by a then-poor understanding of the process of corpse decomposition.

Knowledge of the case is based mostly on the reports of two Austrian military doctors, Glaser and Flückinger, who were successively sent to investigate the case. Scholars have suggested that Paole's case has influenced the depiction of vampires in popular culture texts.

== Background ==
With the Treaty of Passarowitz (Požarevac, 1718), the Habsburg Monarchy annexed most of Serbia and the northern part of Bosnia, territories which had been part of the Ottoman Empire. These remained in Austrian control until the Treaty of Belgrade (1739), when the Austrians were forced to cede them back to the Turks. During this 20-year period, these newly conquered boundary districts were subject to direct military rule from Vienna for strategic, fiscal and other reasons. As a result of the devastation brought about by previous Austrian-Ottoman wars, these areas were in poor condition, with a scarce and partly nomadic population, little agriculture, and an emphasis on cattle-breeding. The Austrian authorities sought to further economic development and to attract German-speaking Serbian settlers to the new territories. Many of the Serbs, especially those who had immigrated from Ottoman-held areas, were recruited as militiamen for the peacetime protection of the borders and for regular military service at war, in exchange for unalienable lots of land. It was in these communities that the earliest well-documented alleged vampire attacks are reported.

== Initial outbreak ==
This outbreak is only known from Flückinger's report about the second epidemic and its prehistory. According to the account of the Medveđa locals as retold there, Arnold Paole was a hajduk who had moved to the village from the Turkish-controlled part of Serbia. He reportedly often mentioned that he had been plagued by a vampire at a location named Gossowa (perhaps Kosovo), but that he had cured himself by eating soil from the vampire's grave and smearing himself with its blood. About 1725, he broke his neck in a fall from a haywagon. Within 20 or 30 days after Paole's death, four people complained that they had been plagued by him. These people all died shortly thereafter. (Note: p. 333-334.)

Ten days later, and forty days after Arnold's death, the villagers, advised by their hadnack (a military/administrative title) who had witnessed such events before, opened his grave. They saw that the corpse was undecomposed, with all the indications of vampirism. His veins were replete with fluid blood "and that fresh blood had flowed from his eyes, nose, mouth, and ears; that the shirt, the covering, and the coffin were completely bloody; that the old nails on his hands and feet, along with the skin, had fallen off, and that new ones had grown". Further, "his body was red, his hair, nails and beard had all grown again. Concluding that Paole was indeed a vampire, they drove a stake through his heart, to which he reacted by frightful shriek as if he were alive, groaning and bleeding. That done, they cut off his head and burnt the whole body. They then disinterred Paole's four supposed victims and performed the same procedure, to prevent them from becoming vampires as well. (Note: p. 334.)

== Second outbreak ==
About five years later, in the winter of 1731, a new epidemic occurred, with more than ten people dying within several weeks, some of them in just two or three days without any previous illness and others after 3 months of languishing. The numbers and the age of the deceased vary somewhat between the two main sources.

Glaser's report on the case states that by 12 December, 13 people had died in the course of six weeks. Glaser names the following victims (here rearranged chronologically): Miliza (Serbian Milica, a 50-year-old woman); Milloi (Serbian Miloje, a 14-year-old boy); Joachim (a 15-year-old boy); Peter (Serbian Petar, a 15-day-old boy); Stanno (Serbian Stana, a 20-year-old woman) as well as her newborn child, which Glaser notes was buried "behind a fence, where the mother had lived" due to not having lived long enough to be baptized; Wutschiza (Serbian Vučica, a nine-year-old boy), Milosova (Serbian Milosava, a 30-year-old wife of a hajduk), Radi (Serbian Rade, a 24-year-old man), and Ruschiza (Serbian Ružica, a 40-year-old woman). The sick had complained of stabs in the sides and pain in the chest, prolonged fever and jerks of the limbs. Glaser reports that the locals considered Milica and Stana to have started the vampirism epidemic. According to his retelling, Milica had come to the village from Ottoman-controlled territories six years before. The locals' testimony indicated that she had always been a good neighbour and that, to the best of their knowledge, she had never "believed or practiced something diabolic". However, she had once mentioned to them that, while still in Ottoman lands, she had eaten two sheep that had been killed by vampires. Stana, on the other hand, had admitted that when she was in Ottoman-controlled lands, she had smeared herself with vampire blood as a protection against vampires (as these had been very active there). According to local belief, both things would cause the women to become vampires after death.

According to Flückinger's report, by 7 January, 17 people had died within a period of three months (the last two of these apparently after Glaser's visit). He mentions Miliza (Milica, a 69-year-old woman, died after a three-month illness); an unnamed 8 year-old child; Milloe (Miloje, a 16-year-old boy, died after a three-day illness); Stana (a 20-year-old woman, died in childbirth after a three-day illness, reportedly said that she had smeared herself with vampire blood) as well as her stillborn child (as Flückinger observes, "half-eaten by the dogs due to a slovenly burial"); an unnamed 10-year-old girl; Joachim (a 17-year-old, died after a three-day illness); the hadnack's unnamed wife; Ruscha (Ruža – variant of Ružica – a woman, died after a ten-day illness); Staniko (Stanjko, a 60-year-old man); Miloe (Miloje, the second victim of that name; a 25-year-old man); Ruža's child (18 days old); Rhade (Rade, a 21-year-old servant of the local hajduk corporal, died after a three-month-long illness); the local standard-bearer's (barjaktar's) unnamed wife, apparently identical to Milosava in the other report along with her child; the eight-week-old child of the hadnack; Stanoicka (Stanojka, a 20-year-old woman, the wife of a hajduk, died after a three-day illness). According to her father-in-law Joviza (Jovica), Stanojka had gone to bed healthy 15 days previous, but had woken up at midnight in terrible fear and cried that she had been throttled by the late Miloje. Flückinger states that the locals explain the new epidemic with the fact that Milica, the first to die, had eaten the meat of sheep that the "previous vampires" (i.e. Paole and his victims from five years prior) had killed. He also mentions, in passing, the claims that Stana, before her death, had admitted having smeared herself with blood to protect herself from vampires and would therefore become a vampire herself, as would her child.

According to Augustin Calmet's analysis of the case, "a girl named Stanoska, daughter of the Heyducq Jotiutzo, who went to bed in perfect health, awoke in the middle of the night in a tremble, uttering terrible shrieks, and saying that the son of Heyducq Millo who had been dead nine weeks, had nearly strangled her in her sleep. She fell into a languid state from that moment, and at the end of three days she died. What this girl had said of Millo's son made him known at once to be a vampire: he was exhumed and found to be such. The principle people of the place, with the doctors and surgeons, examined how vampirism could have sprung up again after the precautions they had taken years before." (Note: p. 334.)

== Investigation ==
The villagers complained of the new deaths to oberstleutnant Schnezzer, the Austrian military commander in charge of the administration. The latter, fearing an epidemic of pestilence, sent for Imperial Contagions-Medicus (roughly, Infectious Disease Specialist) Glaser stationed in the nearby town of Paraćin. On 12 December 1731, Glaser examined the villagers and their houses. He failed to find any signs of a contagious malady and blamed the deaths on the malnutrition common in the region as well as the unhealthy effects of the severe Eastern Orthodox fasting. However, the villagers insisted that the illnesses were caused by vampires. At the moment, two or three households were gathering together at night, with some asleep and others on the watch. They were convinced that the deaths wouldn't stop unless the vampires were executed by the authorities, and threatened to abandon the village in order to save their lives if that wasn't done. Glaser then consented to the exhumation of some of the deceased. To his surprise, he found that most of them were not decomposed and many were swollen and had blood in their mouths, while several others who had died more recently (namely Vučica, Milosava, and Rade) were rather decomposed. Glaser outlined his findings in a report to the Jagodina commandant's office, recommending that the authorities should pacify the population by fulfilling its request to "execute" the vampires. Schnezzer furthered Glaser's report to the Supreme Command in Belgrade (the city was then held by Austrian forces). The vice-commandant, Botta Adorno, sent a second commission to investigate the case.

The new commission included a military surgeon, Johann Flückinger, two officers, lieutenant colonel Büttner and J. H. von Lindenfels, along with two other military surgeons, Siegele and Johann Friedrich Baumgarten. On 7 January, together with the village elders and some local Gypsies, they opened the graves of the deceased. Their findings were similar to Glaser's, although their report contains much more anatomical detail. The commission established that, while five of the corpses (the hadnack's wife and child, Rade, and the standard-bearer's wife and child) were decomposed, the remaining twelve were "quite complete and undecayed" and exhibited the traits that were commonly associated with vampirism. Their chests and in some cases other organs were filled with fresh (rather than coagulated) blood; the viscera were estimated to be "in good condition"; various corpses looked plump and their skin had a "red and vivid" (rather than pale) colour; and in several cases, "the skin on ... hands and feet, along with the old nails, fell away on their own, but on the other hand completely new nails were evident, along with a fresh and vivid skin". In the case of Milica, the hajduks who witnessed the dissection were very surprised at her plumpness, stating that they had known her well, from her youth, and that she had always been very "lean and dried-up"; it was only in the grave she had attained this plumpness. The surgeons summarized all these phenomena by stating that the bodies were in "vampiric condition" (Vampyrenstand). After the examination had been completed, the Romani cut off the heads of the supposed vampires and burned both their heads and their bodies, the ashes being thrown in the West Morava river. The decomposed bodies were laid back into their graves. The report is dated 26 January 1732, Belgrade, and bears the signatures of the five officers involved.

On 13 February, Glaser's father, Viennese doctor Johann Friedrich Glaser, who was also a correspondent of the Nuremberg journal Commercium Litterarium, sent its editors a letter describing the entire case as his son had written to him about it already on 18 January. The story aroused great interest. After that, both reports (especially Flückinger's more detailed version) and the letter were reprinted in a number of articles and treatises.

Calmet notes: "They discovered at last, after much search, that the defunct Arnold Paul had killed not only the four persons of whom we have spoken, but also several oxen, of which the new vampires had eaten, and amongst others the son of Millo. Upon these indications they resolved to disinter all those who had died within a certain time, etc. Amongst forty, seventeen were found with all the most evident signs of vampirism; so they transfixed their hearts and cut off their heads also, then cast their ashes into the river. All the information and executions we have just mentioned were made judicial, in proper form, and attested by several officers who were garrisoned in the country, by the chief surgeons of the regiments, and by the principal inhabitants of the place. The verbal process of it was sent towards the end of last January to the Imperial Counsel of War at Vienna, which had established a military commission to examine into the truth of all these circumstances. Such was the declaration of the Hadnagi Barriarar and the ancient Heyducqs; and it was signed by Battuer, first lieutenant of the regiment of Alexander of Wurtemburg, Clickstenger, surgeon-in-chief of the regiment of Frustemburch, three other surgeons of the company and Guoichitz, captain at Stallach." (Note: p. 334-335.)

== See also ==
- Petar Blagojević
- Sava Savanović
- Mercy Brown vampire incident
- Treatise on the Apparitions of Spirits and on Vampires or Revenants

== Notes ==
- Calmet, Augustin (1751). Treatise on the Apparitions of Spirits and on Vampires or Revenants: of Hungary, Moravia, et al. The Complete Volumes I & II. 2015. CreateSpace Independent Publishing Platform. ISBN 1-5331-4568-7.

== Sources ==
- Glaser's report in the original German
- Johann Friedrich Glaser's letter to the editors of Commercium Litterarium (also in German)
- Flückinger's report in the original German
- Nowosadtko, Jutta. 2004. Der "Vampyrus Serviensis" und sein Habitat: Impressionen von der österreichischen Militärgränze. In: Militär und Gesellschaft in der Frühen Neuzeit. 8 (2004). Heft 2. Universitätsverlag Potsdam.
