= Sava Savanović =

Vampire in Balkan and Serbian folklore

Sava Savanović (Serbian Cyrillic: Сава Савановић) is one of the most famous vampires in Balkan and Serbian folklore.

== Legend ==
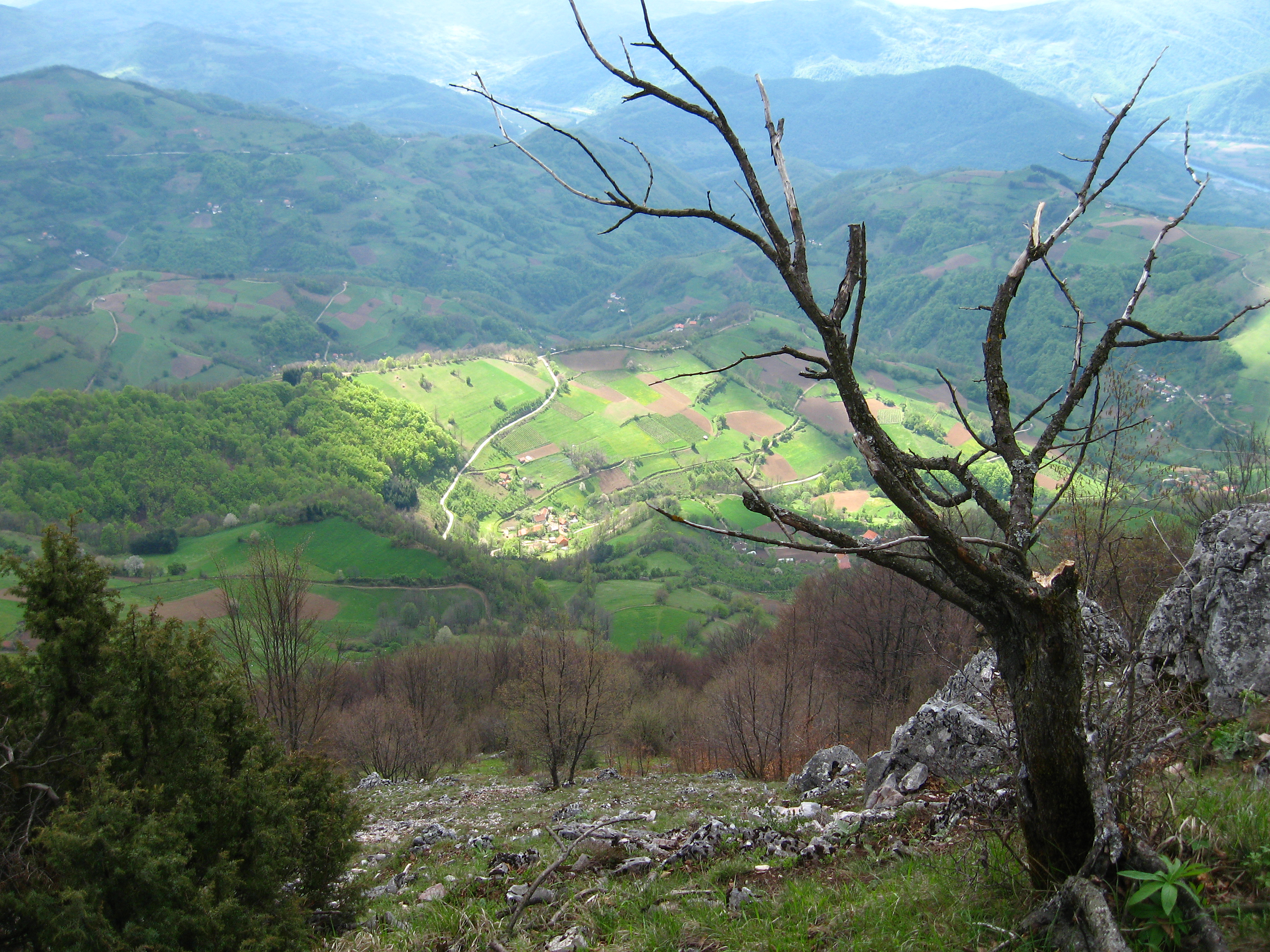
Village of Zarožje

Sava Savanović was said to have lived in an old watermill on the Rogačica river, at Zarožje village in the municipality of Bajina Bašta. It was said that he killed and drank the blood of the millers when they came to mill their grains. Although he is usually said to have been the first Serbian vampire, there are claims that he was pre-dated in Serbian folklore by Petar Blagojević from Kisiljevo, who died in 1725. Blagojević and the affair surrounding him came to European attention at the time, under the name Peter Plogojowitz, and represented one of the earliest examples of vampire hysteria.

Sava Savanović still remains as the best known vampire in Serbia today.

== Watermill ==
The watermill is located 3 km (1.9 mi) from the Bajina Bašta–Valjevo road, in the deep valley of the Rogačica river. The location of the mill has been described as a "narrow and dark ravine". For the last several decades the watermill associated with Savanović has been owned by the Jagodić family, and is usually called Jagodića vodenica (Jagodići's watermill). It was in operation until the late 1950s. After its closure, it became a tourist site along with other attractions in Valjevo and nearby villages.

By the early 2010s, the ownership problems were resolved and the local administration had the watermill made of wood and stone reconstructed and adapted into a proper tourist attraction. Plans also included that the watermill be operational again, producing the flour named after Sava Savanović while the local farmers would sell honey and rakia. A construction of the proper road to which would connect it to the main one was also planned. Author of the reconstruction project was architect Aleksandar Gavović.

The first finished project was the road, but just a month after it was completed, the mill collapsed in 2012. The municipal authorities issued a tongue-in-cheek public health warning, advising people that Savanović was now free to look for a new home. In 2011, it was evident that it may collapse soon, but local authorities hoped it would make it to the reconstruction. The project of recreating the watermill in its authentic form was made, but it lacked funding. Originally, only the roof collapsed (in 2012) but in the subsequent years, the wooden walls buckled as well.

By December 2018, the mill was reconstructed and the access road was partially improved. The foundations and the pillars were reinforced and the new roof was built and tiled. Works are scheduled to continue in the spring of 2019 when the mill wheel, grinding stone, and artificial widening of the stream will be finished. After this is completed, the mill should become operational again.

== In culture ==
Sava Savanović appears in the story Posle devedeset godina ("Ninety Years Later"), written by the Serbian realist writer Milovan Glišić, and in the horror film Leptirica inspired by the story. He also appears in the novel Strah i njegov sluga (Fear and His Servant) written by Mirjana Novaković.

In January 2010, the city of Valjevo selected the mythical Sava Savanović as the touristic mascot of the city and the entire Kolubara region. Zarožje and Valjevo are on the opposing sides of the Povlen mountain, but both claim Savanović as their brand. The local community of Zarožje threatened to sue the city, but ultimately only reported to the police in Bajina Bašta that Savanović was "stolen from them".

Sava Savanović briefly appears in the Kim Newman novel One Thousand Monsters in the Anno Dracula series. One of the vampire refugees in Tokyo, his severed head is seen rolling out of the melee during the climactic battle for Yokai Town.

== See also ==
- Vampires in popular culture
- Vampire
- Petar Blagojević
- Arnold Paole
- Leptirica
