= Michael Ranft =

Lutheran pastor, writer and historian (1700-1774)

- Born: 9 December 1700; Güldengossa
- Died: 18 April 1774 (aged 73); Löbichau
- Education: University of Leipzig

Michael Ranft (or Ranfft; also Rauff), in Latin Michael Ranfftius (9 December 1700 – 18 April 1774) was a Lutheran pastor, writer and historian who is known for his writings on vampires in Germany.

== Biography ==
A pastor's son, Michael Ranft was born in Güldengossa and went to school in Chemnitz. From 1720 he studied at University of Leipzig, where he received the degree of bachelor of philosophy. In 1724 he graduated with a master's. From 1725 he was steward to the Vice President of the Court of Appeal in Gröditz.

In 1727 Michael Ranft succeeded Friedrich Wilhelm Preuser in the diaconate of the city of Nebra. The city council there promised to repair the apartment that Ranft had been allocated, which was dilapidated, but nothing was done until 1732 and Ranft repeatedly complained to the Presbytery of Leipzig.

While he struggled along on an income of 150 talers at most and endured poor living conditions, Ranft conducted research on vampirism. His book, De masticatione mortuorum in tumulis (1728; On the Chewing of the Dead in their Tombs), dealing with cases of the dead who had supposedly devoured the linen in their coffins, is still regularly quoted in vampire literature.

In 1749 became pastor in Großstechau in the Principality of Altenburg, where he died in 1774. His sons Michael Gebhard and Christian Solomon Ranft were also pastors in Großstechau or Rückersdorf.

== De masticatione mortuorum in tumulis ==
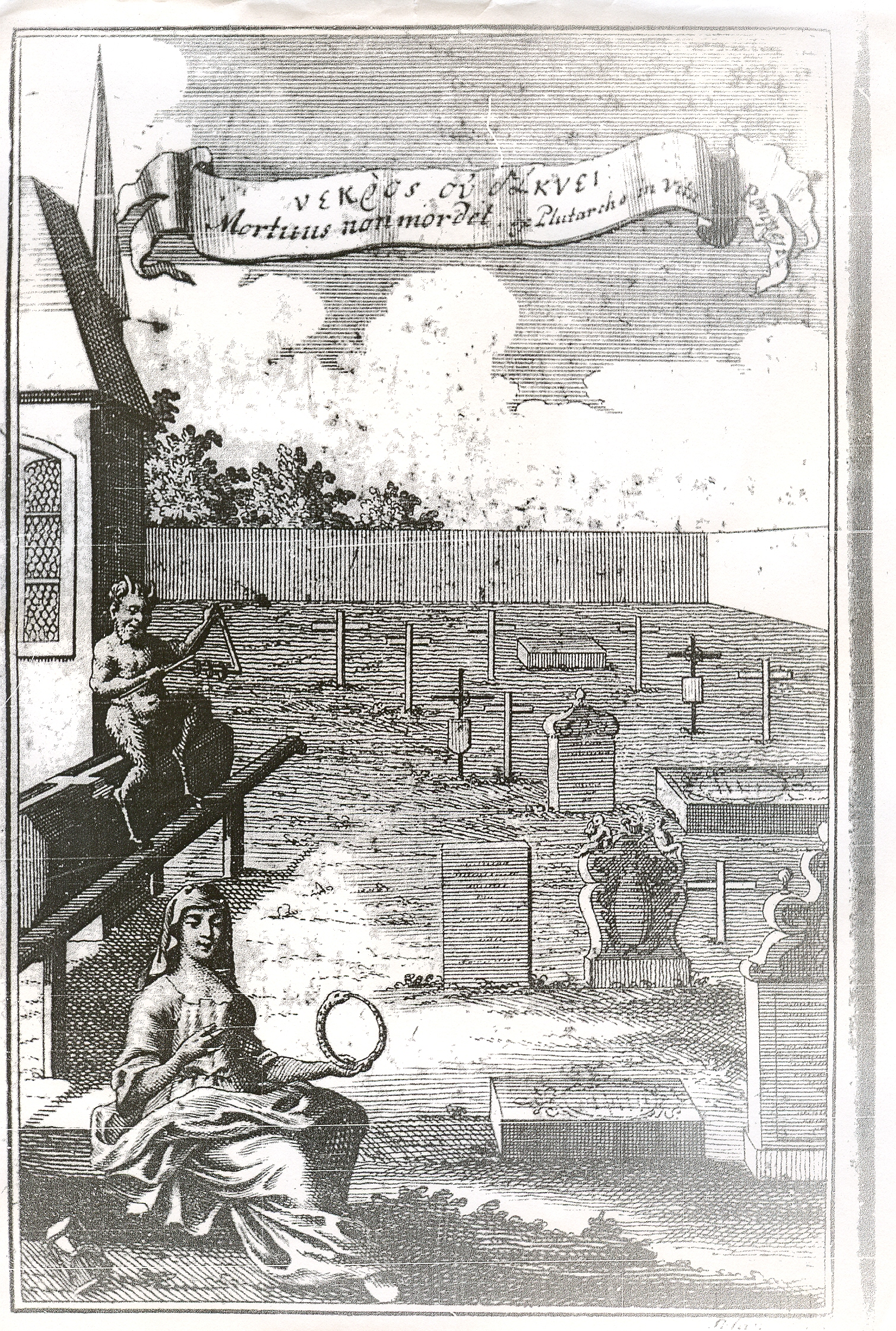
Engraving Tractat von dem Kauen und Schmatzen der Todten in Gräbern

Ranft recounts cases reported from Germany of dead persons devouring the linen and everything else that was in reach of their mouths, and claims that people who happened to be nearby would hear sounds as if of pigs growling and grunting. A particular case he mentions is that of Heinrich, Count of Salm, who after being declared dead was put in his grave, in the churchyard of the Abbey of Haute-Seille, while he was still alive. Witnesses claimed that they heard loud cries during the night at the place he was buried, and the next day they opened his tomb, disinterred him and discovered that he had gnawed the flesh of his arms. Other cases mentioned in the book date back to the year 1355. According to Ranft, in some places in Germany mounds of dirt were placed under the chins of the dead, while in other places a coin and a stone were placed in the mouth, and in still other places a handkerchief was tied tightly around the throat.

== Bibliography ==
- Dissertatio historico-critica de masticatione mortuorum in tumulis. Breitkopf, Leipzig 1725.
- De masticatione mortuorum in tumulis, (Oder von dem Kauen und Schmatzen der Todten in Gräbern) liber singularis: exhibens duas exercitationes, quarum prior historico-critica posterior philosophica est. Martini, Leipzig 1728. en ligne.
- Necrologium Domus Saxonicae Coaevum, Oder Vollständige Lebens-Geschichte Aller in diesem ietztlauffenden XVIII. Seculo Verstorbenen Herzoge von Sachsen. Nebst Dem Anhangs-Weise beygefügten Leben und Tode Der Allerdurchl. und Großmächtigst. Frauen, Frauen Christiane Eberhardine von Brandenburg-Bayreuth Martini, Leipzig 1728. en ligne.
- Merckwürdige Lebens- und Regierungsgeschichte Ludovici I. Königs von Spanien und Indien. Martini, Leipzig 1728. en ligne.
- Leben und Thaten Des Weltberühmten Königl. Pohln. und Churfürstl. Sächsischen Obersten Staats-Ministers und General-Feld-Marschalls Jacob Heinrichs Des heil. Röm. Reichs Grafens von Flemming. Nebst einiger Nachricht Von Denen beyden ungleicher Zeit verstorbenen Grafen von Vitzthum Und von Watzdorff, Königl. Pohln. und Churfürstl. Sächß. Staats- und Cabinets-Ministris. Grießbach, Naumburg und Zeitz 1732. en ligne.
- Tractat von dem Kauen und Schmatzen der Todten in Gräbern, worin die wahre Beschaffenheit derer Hungarischen Vampyrs und Blut-Sauger gezeigt, auch alle von dieser Materie bißher zum Vorschein gekommene Schrifften recensiret werden Teubner, Leipzig 1734. (Neuauflage unter dem Titel: Traktat von dem Kauen und Schmatzen der Toten in Gräbern 2006 im UBooks-Verlag. ISBN 3866080158)
- Staats- Und Helden-Geschichte Des frühzeitigen Conquerantens Unserer Zeiten Don Carlos, Infantens Von Spanien [Regensburg] 1735.
- Merckwürdigstes Leben und Schicksal Des Weltbekannten Königs Stanislai Frankfurt a.M. und Leipzig 1736. en ligne.
- Kurtze Standt- und Trauer-Rede, welche [...] bey solenner Beerdigung [...] des [...] Herr Ludwig Gebhardts des Heil. Röm. Reichs Graffens von Hoym [...] gehalten. Naumburg 1738.
- Des Weltberühmten Fürstens Leopoldi von Anhalt-Dessau, Leben und Thaten. Welchem ein Anhang einer kurtzen Beschreibung des gantzen Hoch-Fürstlichen Hauses und gesamten Fürstenthums Anhalt beygefüget ist. Frankfurt a.M. und Leipzig 1742. en ligne.
- Leben und Schrifften aller Chur-Sächsischen Gottesgelehrten, die mit der Doctor-Würde gepranget und in diesem ietztlauffenden Jahrhundert das Zeitliche geseegnet. 2 Theile. Deer, Leipzig 1742.
- Leben und Thaten des ietzt regierenden Pabsts [d.i. Papst Benedikt XIV. und aller lebenden Cardinäle der Römischen catholischen Kirche. Hamburg und Rudolstadt 1743.
- Leben und Thaten des Weltberühmten Grafens Mauritii von Sachsen, Marschalls von Franckreich. Brandt, Berlin 1746. en ligne.
- Leben und Thaten sowohl des Grafens von Löwendahl, als der beyden Herzoge von Noailles und Richelieu; allesammt Marschalle von Frankreich: nebst einer Fortsetzung der merkwürdigen Lebensgeschichte des berühmten Grafens von Sachsen. Heinsius, Leipzig 1749. en ligne.
- Leben und Thaten des jüngstverstorbenen Weltberühmten Graf Moritzens von Sachsen, General-Marschalls der Königl. Französischen Armeen; nebst Einigen Verbesserungen und Zusätzen zu dem Leben seines Freundes, des Marschalls von Löwendahl. Frankfurt a.M. und Leipzig 1751. en ligne.
- Corpus Doctrinae Evangelico-Lutheranae. 2 Bände. Heinsius, Leipzig 1754-1755 (Première partie en ligne et Seconde partie en ligne.
- Vollständige Beschreibung des Rußischen Reichs und aller darzu gehörigen Lande, Völker und Oerter, welche aus den zuverläßigsten Nachrichten mit Zuziehung der besten Landkarten und neuesten Reisebeschreibungen ans Licht stellt. Heinsius, Leipzig 1767. en ligne.
- Die merkwürdige Lebensgeschichte des unglücklichen Rußischen Kaysers Peters des Dritten: sammt vielen Anecdoten des Rußischen Hofs und derer Personen, die seit einiger Zeit an solchem geherrschet, oder sonst viel gegolten haben, aus zuverläßigen Nachrichten ans Licht gestellt von einem Freunde der Wahrheit. Holle, Leipzig 1773.
- Das merkwürdige Leben des berühmten Fürstens Menzikow, welches mit vielen Anekdoten ans Licht stellt ein Liebhaber der Wahrheit. Holle, Leipzig 1774. en ligne.

== See also ==
- Augustin Calmet
