= List of vampiric creatures in folklore =

List of vampire and vampire-like creatures of global folklore

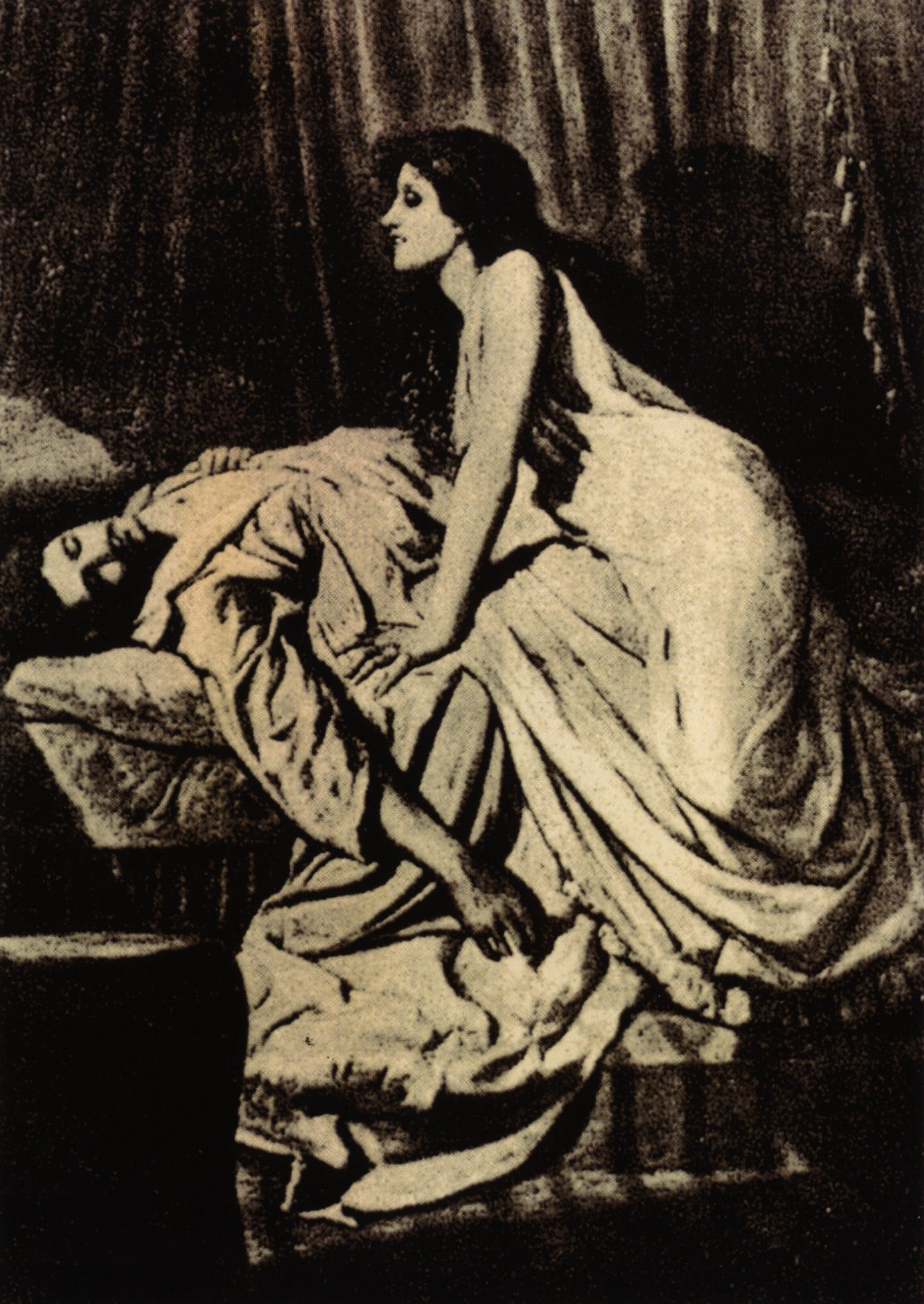
Vampires

This list covers the many types of vampire-like legendary creatures of global folklore or people that were supposedly vampires. Since ancient times, people have had tales of supernatural creatures that feed on humans' vital essence (generally in the form of blood). This list does not include any vampire that originates in a work of fiction.

== A ==
- Abchanchu – Bolivia
- Abere – Melanesia
- Abhartach – Ireland
- Adze – Ghana
- Alp – Germany – Variations throughout the world.
- Amalanhig – Philippines
- Aniukha – Mongolia, China
- Ardat-lili – Mesopotamia
- Arnold Paole – Serbia
- Asanbosam – Ashanti people – Also called Asasabonsam, this iron-toothed creature dangled its hooklike feet from trees to snare travelers.
- Asema – Surinam
- Asiman – Ashanti people
- Aswang – Philippines
- Aufhocker – Germany
- Azeman – Suriname

== B ==
- Badmaarag – Mongolia
  - also called Baadai
- Baital – India; Variations: Baitala, Baitel, Baitol, Bay Valley, Katakhanoso, Vetal, Vetala
- Bajang – Malaysia
- Bakalou baka – Haitian Vodou; Also called pinga maza, a shapeshifting evil spirit with red eyes.
- Bakeneko – Japanese
- Bantu – India, Three main kinds of this vampire including:
  - Bantu Dodong
  - Bantu Parl
  - Bantu Saburo
- Baobhan Sith – Highlands of Scotland
- Beatha Greimach – Highlands of Scotland; literally "the breath thief".
- Berbalang – Philippines
- Berwick Vampire – England: A 12th-century rich man who was said to roam the town by night after his death. The townspeople, fearing that he would bring disease, cut up and burned the body, ending his nightly appearances but not preventing the plague.
- Bezkost – Balkans
- Bhayangkara – Tibet
- Bhūta – India
- Bibi – the Balkans
- The Blow Vampire – 1706 Kadam, Bohemia
- Blutsauger – Germany; Variant: Blutsäuger
- Boo Hag – America
- Boraro – Colombian folklore
- Brahmaparush – India
- Breslan Vampire – Breslau, Poland (17th Century)
- Buckinghamshire Vampire – 1196 Buckinghamshire, England
- Burach Bhadi – Scotland

== C ==
- Cadaver Sanguins – England
- Cãoera - Brazil and Guyana
- Callicantzaro – Greece
- Camazotz – Maya Mythology
- Canchus – Peru also spelled:
  - Pumapmicuc
- Capelobo – Brazilian mythology
- Catacano – Crete
  - also spelled Kathakano
- Chedipe – India
- Children of Judas – Bulgaria and Serbia
- Chonchon – Latin America
- Chordewa – Bengal
- Chupacabra – Originated in Puerto Rico; subsequent reports (some erroneous) in Brazil, Chile, Mexico, The United States of America
- Churel – India
  - also spelled Churail
- Cihuacoatl – Aztec
- Cihuateteo – Aztec Mythology, Mexico
- Croglin Grange, The Vampire of – Cumberland, England

== D ==
- Dachnavar – Armenia – also spelled Dakhanavar, a vampire who sucked the blood from victims' feet, preying on newcomers to his valleys.
- Dala-Kumara Yaka – Sri Lanka
- Danag – Philippines
- Danava
- Dhampire – Slovakia, with the following variations in spelling:
  - Dhampyr
  - Dhampiresa
  - Dampyr
- Dila – Philippines
- Doppelsauger – Germany also spelled:
  - Dubblesuger or Dubbelsügger
- Draugr – Norse Variations: Aptgangr (“one who walks after death”), Aptrgangr, Barrow Dweller, Gronnskjegg, Haubui, Haugbui (“Sleeper in the Mound”) Has two main versions land and sea.
- Drekavac

== E ==
- Encourado – Brazil
- Edimmu – Mesopotamia – also spelled Etemmu – The returned spirit of a person who did not receive a proper burial.
- Efe Bayar – Türkiye
- Ekek – Philippines
- Empusa – Ancient Greece – also called Mormolykiai, Empusas
- Eretik – Russia
- Estrie – Jewish Tradition

== F ==
- Fifollet – United States (Louisiana) also spelled:
  - Feu Follet
- Finnegan Thain – Scotland

== G ==
- Gashadokuro – Japan
- Glaistig – Scotland
- Jure Grando – Croatia, first real person described as a vampire in historical records
- Ghoul – Arabic lore – "The Arabic stories of the ghole spread east and were adopted by the people of the Orient, where it evolved as a type of vampiric spirit called a ghoul." Variants: Alqul (Arabia), Aluga (Bible; Proverbs 30:15), Balbal (Tagbanua, Philippines), Ghoulas (Algeria); Katacan (Sri Lanka).

== H ==
- Hannya – Japan
- Haubui – Norwegian
- Haidam Vampire – Romania (Hungary, before 1918)
- The Highgate Vampire – Highgate Cemetery England
- Hisi-Hsua-Kuei – China
- Hi'ilei – Hawaii
- hooh-strah-dooh – Wyandot – North America
- Hone-onna- Japan
- Hortdan - Turkic with different types
  - Hortlak (Turkish)
  - Xortdan (Azerbaijan)
  - Hortan (Tuva)
- Hupia – Taíno with the spelling variations:
  - opia
  - opi'a
  - op'a
  - operi'to

== I ==
- Impundulu – South Africa
  - plural iimpundulu
  - also called ishologu
- Incubus/Succubus – Medieval Europe
- Inovercy – Russia
- Iso-onna – Japan

== J ==
- Jaud
  - A similar mythical creature is a Drekavac
- Jenglot – Indonesia
- Jiangshi – China, also under the names of:
  - Kiang shi
  - Kuang shi
  - Chang Kuei
  - Cương Thi
- Jacques St. Germain - Louisiana
- Jigarkhwar – India
  - also spelled Jigarkhor
- Joint-eater – Irish
  - also called Alp-luachra
- Jubokko – Japan
- Jure Grando – Croatia

== K ==
- K'uei – China
- Kalu-Kumara Yaka – Sri Lanka
- Kappa 河童 – Japan with the following spelling variations:
  - Gataro 川太郎
  - Kawako 川子
- Kasha – Japan
- Kathakano – Crete
- Keres - Greece
- Kichkandi – Nepal
- Kephn – Burma
- Kranokolaptes - Greece
- Krasue - Thailand and it Southeast Asian variations. Variants: Ahp (Cambodia), Kasu (Laos), Kuyang (Indonesia), Ma lai (Vietnam)
- Kravopiec – Bulgarian
- Kudlak – Czechoslovakia
- Kumiho – Korea
- Kuntilanak - Indonesia
- Kukudhi – Albania
- Kyuuketsuki 吸血鬼 – Japan
- Karalanos – Egypt
- Katalina Bergeta - Norway

== L ==
- Laistrygones – Ancient Greece, also under the names of:
  - Laestrygones
  - Laistrygonians
  - Laestrygonians
- La Llorona – Central America and the United States
- Lamashtu – Mesopotamia
- Lamia – Libya
- Lampire – Bosnia
- Langsuir – Malaysia, also under the names of:
  - Langsuyar
  - Pontianak
  - Kuntilanak
- Leanashe – Ireland (dubious)
- Lemures – Ancient Rome
- Leyak – Indonesia
- Liebava – Moravia
- Lidérc – Hungary
- Lilith (לִּילִית) – Jewish Tradition
- Lilu/Lilitu – Mesopotamia
- Loango – Ashanti and Asanbosam people, Africa
- Loogaroo – Caribbean Islands \ Mauritius
- Lugat – Albania, also under the name of:
  - Liogat
  - Kukuthi

== M ==
- Ma cà rồng - Vietnam
- Mamba Mutu - Democratic Republic of the Congo
- Manananggal – Philippines also spelled:
  - Tanggal
- Mandurugo – Philippines
- Mara – Slavonic also spelled:
  - Mora
- Mati-Anak – Indonesia also spelled:
  - Pontianak
- Meçkey – Turkic peoples, with the following spelling variation
  - Mhachkay
  - Meçik
- The Melrose Vampire – Melrose Abbey, Scotland
- Melusine – France
- The Mikonos Vampire – Greece 1702
- Mjertovjec – Belarus
- Mmbyu – India also spelled or an early form of:
  - Pocu Pati
- Moroi - Romania
- Moskitto - North America
- Mosquito Man - Native American, Pacific Northwest
- Mullo – Romani the plural being Mulé, with the following spelling variation:
  - Mullo
- Muroni – Romania

== N ==
- Nachzehrer – Germany with the following possible spelling variations:
  - Neuntöter
  - Nachtöter
- Nelapsi – Slovakia
- Nora – Hungary
- Nukekubi – Japan
- Nure-onna – Japan

== O ==
- Obayifo – Ashanti
- Obur – Bulgaria
- Ohyn – Poland
- Ol' Higue – Jamaica
- Opyrb – Slavic with the following spelling variation:
  - Opirb

== P ==
- Pacu Pati – India
- Palis - Iran
- Papinijuwari – Australia
- Patasola - South America
- Pelesit or Palasik – Indonesia
- Penanggal – Malaysia
- Petar Blagojevich – Serbia
- Peuchen – Chile
- Pricolici - Romania
- Pichal Peri – India
- Pichas – Nepal
- Pishacha - India, Thailand
- Pishtaco – South America, Peru
- Plakavac - Herzegovina
- Pontianak – Indonesia

== R ==
- Rakshasa – India
- Raktha pisachi – India
- Ramanga – Madagascar
- Revenants – England
- Richmond Vampire – Richmond, Virginia, USA
- Riri Yaka – Sri Lanka
- Ruza Vlajna – Serbia

== S ==
- Sava Savanović – Serbia
- Sekhmet - Egypt
- Shade
- Shtriga – Albania
- Sigbin – Philippines
- Snallygaster - America
- Soucouyant – Trinidadian Guadeloupean it has the spelling variation:
  - Soucriant
- Stregoni Benefici – Italy – A vampire that preys on other vampires.
- Strigoi – Romania with the following variations:
  - Strigoaica
  - Moroi
- Strix – Ancient Rome with the following spelling variations:
  - Striga
  - Stirge
  - Strige
- Strzyga – Slavic also a male variant
  - Strzygoń
- Suangi – New Guinea
- Sukuyan – Caribbean
- Succubus – Medieval Europe
- Sybaris – Greece

== T ==
- Talamaur – Australia
- Teyollohcuani – Mexico
- Thayé – Burma with the spelling variation:
  - Tasei
- Tlahuelpuchi – Mexico – A human witch who sucked blood. Also spelled Tlaciques

== U ==
- Ubır - Turkic with spelling variation
  - Obur
  - Hobur
  - Vupar
- Ubour – Bulgaria
- Upiór – Poland
- Upír – Slovakia
- Upir – Ukraine though could be linked to:
- Upyr – Russia
- Uruku – Mesopotamia
- Ustrel – Bulgaria
- Utukku – Mesopotamia

== V ==
- Vampire pumpkins and watermelons – Balkan
- Vampir – Bulgaria, Serbia, Slovenia, Yugoslavia, Bosnia, and Croatia – Also called vapir, vepir, or vipir – the returned spirit of a person who did not receive a proper burial or had lived as a murderer, thief, or witch. Often infiltrating a community to pose as a normal person, they would roam at night to drink blood.
- Vampiros – Brazil and Portugal
- Vârcolac – Romania; variations: Pricolici and Varcolaci
- Vǎrkolak – Bulgaria
- Vendalla – Ethiopia
- Vetala – India
- Vhlk'h dlaka – Greece
- Vjesci – Poland
  - Opji
  - Wupji
- Vourdalak – Russia; variations: Verdilak, Wurdalak
- Vlkodlak – Siberia; Variants: Volkodlak, Volkoslak
- Vrykolakas (βρυκόλακας) – Greece; variation: Vorvolakas, Vrykolatios (Santorini)

== W ==
- Wak Wak – Philippines
- Wampir – Poland

== Y ==
- Yama – Tibet, Nepal and Mongolia
- Yara-ma-yha-who – Australia – A four-foot-tall red creature with suckers on its fingers and toes that waited in fig trees to drop onto travelers. It would drain their blood, swallow them whole, and then regurgitate them, still alive.
- Yaka – Sri Lanka
- Yaksha – Sri Lanka, India
- Yakshini - India
- Yuki-onna - Japan

== Z ==
- Zaloznye Pokojniki – Russia
- Zburător - Romania
- Zorfabio – New Zealand
- Zaolas – Brazil

== See also ==
- Dhampir
- List of dhampirs
- List of vampires

== Bibliography ==
- Bane, Theresa (2010). Encyclopedia of Vampire Mythology. McFarland. ISBN 9780786444526.
- Bunson, Matthew (2000). The Vampire Encyclopedia. Gramercy Books. ISBN 9780517162064.
- Spence, Lewis (1960) An Encyclopaedia of Occultism University Books Inc. New Hyde Park, New York
- The Vampire Watchers Handbook by "Constantine Gregory" and Craig Glenday, 2003 St. Martin's Press, New York, pp. 62–63
- Mysteries of Mind Space and Time, The Unexplained series 1992 Orbis Publishing Limited, Westport, Connecticut, po. 150–151
- A World of Vampires, documentary special, from the Two-Disk Special Edition Lost Boys DVD
- The Vampire Book by J. Gordon Melton
- Vampire Universe by Johnathan Maberry
- Vampires by Leonard R. N. Ashley
