= Vampire folklore by region =

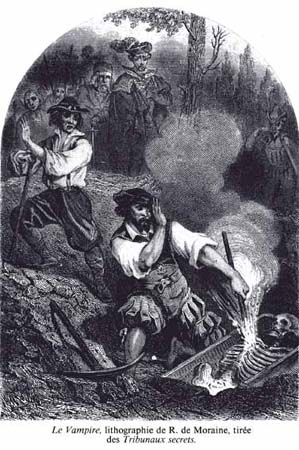
Le Vampire, lithograph by R. de Moraine Les Tribunaux secrets (1864)

Legends of vampires have existed for millennia; cultures such as the Mesopotamians, Hebrews, ancient Greeks, and Romans had tales of demonic entities and blood-drinking spirits which are considered precursors to modern vampires. Despite the occurrence of vampire-like creatures in these ancient civilizations, the folklore for the entity known today as the vampire originates almost exclusively from early 18th-century Central Europe, particularly Transylvania as verbal traditions of many ethnic groups of the region were recorded and published. In most cases, vampires are revenants of evil beings, suicide victims, or witches, but can also be created by a malevolent spirit possessing a corpse or a living person being bitten by a vampire themselves. Belief in such legends became so rife that in some areas it caused mass hysteria and even public executions of people believed to be vampires.

Tales of the undead consuming the blood or flesh of living beings have been found in nearly every culture around the world for many centuries. Today these entities are predominantly known as vampires, but in ancient times, the term vampire did not exist; blood drinking and similar activities were attributed to demons or spirits who would eat flesh and drink blood; even the devil was considered synonymous with the vampire. Almost every nation has associated blood drinking with some kind of revenant or demon, from the ghouls of Arabia to the goddess Sekhmet of Egypt. Indeed, some of these legends could have given rise to the European folklore, though they are not strictly considered vampires by historians when using today's definitions.

== Asia ==
=== West Asia ===
==== Ancient Mesopotamia ====
Many cultures in ancient Mesopotamia had stories involving blood-drinking demons. The Persians were one of the first civilizations thought to have tales of such monsters; creatures attempting to drink blood from men are depicted on excavated pottery shards. Ancient Babylonia had tales of the mythical lilu and lilitu, that gave rise to Lilith (Hebrew לילית) and her children lilin from Hebrew demonology. They were ghosts of unsatisfied mortals who sought their mate among the living.

Other Mesopotamian demons such as the Babylonian goddess Lamashtu, (Sumerian Kamadme/Dimme) and Gallu of the Utukku group are mentioned as having vampiric natures. Lamashtu is another demoness that left a mark on the figure of Lilith. Many incantations invoke her as a malicious "Daughter of Anu/Heaven", and she is often depicted as a terrifying blood-sucking creature with a lion's head, riding on a donkey. Lamashtu primarily preyed on newborns and their mothers. She was said to watch pregnant women vigilantly, particularly when they went into labor. Afterwards, she would snatch the newborn from the mother to drink its blood and eat its flesh. In the canonical Lamaštu incantations, she is described; "Wherever she comes, wherever she appears, she brings evil and destruction. Men, beasts, trees, rivers, roads, buildings, she brings harm to them all. A flesh-eating, bloodsucking monster is she." Gallu was a demon closely associated with Lamashtu, though the word (like "Utukku") is also used as a general term for demons, like "evil Utukku" or "evil Gallu".

Gallu is theorized to have influenced the Graeco-Byzantine myth of Gello (also spelled Gyllou or Gyllo). There she appears as a child-stealing and child-killing female demon, in the manner of Lamia and Lilith.

==== Judaism ====
The Hebrew word Alukah (literal translation is 'leech') is synonymous with vampirism or vampires, as is Motetz Dam (literally, 'blood sucker'). The most detailed description of the alukah appears in Sefer Hasidim, where the creature is understood to be a living human being, but can shape-change into a wolf. It can fly (by releasing its long hair) and would eventually die if prevented from feeding on blood for a long enough time. Once dead, a vampire can be prevented from becoming a demon by being buried with its mouth stuffed with earth.

Lilith was considered a demon and was often depicted as a threat to women and children. The legend of Lilith was included in some traditional Jewish texts: according to the medieval text The Alphabet of Ben Sira, she was considered to be Adam's first wife before Eve. In this text, Lilith pronounced the Ineffable Name and left Adam in the Garden of Eden, and later (mainly in the Zohar) become the queen of the demons. Much like the Greek striges, Lilith would prey on young babies and their mothers at night, as well as males. Because Hebrew law absolutely forbade the eating of human flesh or the drinking of any type of blood, Lilith's blood drinking was described as exceptionally evil. To ward off attacks from Lilith, parents used to hang amulets around their children’s cradles.

Later vampire traditions appear among diaspora Jews in Central Europe, in particular the medieval interpretation of Lilith. In common with vampires, this version of Lilith (in Sefer Hasidim) was held to be able to transform herself into an animal, usually a cat, and charm her victims into believing that she is benevolent or irresistible. Another depiction of a cat-witch equated with Lilith is the Sephardic La Brusha/Broosha. However, Lilith and lilin usually strangle rather than drain victims, and in the Kabbalah, she retains many attributes found in vampires.

A late 17th- or early 18th-century Kabbalah document was found in one of the Ritman library's copies of Jean de Pauly's translation of the Zohar. The text contains two amulets, one for male (lazakhar), the other for female (lanekevah). The invocations on the amulets mention Adam, Eve, and Lilith, Chavah Rishonah and the angels—Sanoy, Sansinoy, Smangeluf, Shmari'el, and Hasdi'el. A few lines in Yiddish are shown as dialog between the prophet Elijah and Lilith, in which she has come with a host of demons to kill the mother, take her newborn and "to drink her blood, suck her bones and eat her flesh". She informs Elijah that she will lose power if someone uses her secret names, which she reveals at the end.

Other Jewish stories depict vampires in a more traditional way. In "The Kiss of Death", the daughter of the demon king Ashmodai snatches the breath of a man who has betrayed her, strongly reminiscent of a fatal kiss of a vampire. A rare story found in Sefer Hasidim #1465 tells of an old vampire named Astryiah who uses her hair to drain the blood from her victims. A similar tale from the same book describes staking a witch through the heart to ensure she does not come back from the dead to haunt her enemies.

=== South and East Asia ===
Rooted in older folklore, the modern belief in vampires spread throughout Asia with tales of ghoulish entities from the mainland, to vampiric beings from the islands of Southeast Asia. In the 1980's in South-east Asia the Laotian Hmong people were suffering from a strange epidemic where they would die at night on their backs with faces full of terror and people believed it was the night-mare spirit. India also developed other vampiric legends. The Bhūta or Préta is the soul of a man who died an untimely death. It wanders around animating dead bodies at night, attacking the living much like a ghoul. In northern India, there is the BrahmarākŞhasa, a vampire-like creature with a head encircled by intestines and a skull from which it drank blood. Japan has no native legends about vampires. However some Japanese mythical creatures bear some similarities to vampires, such as the Nure-onna who is a snake-like woman that feasts on human blood. Japanese vampires made their first appearances in the cinema of Japan during the late 1950s.

==== China ====
Jiangshi, sometimes called "Chinese vampires" by Westerners, are corpses that are usually reanimated due to magical reasons. In ancient China, people always had the preference of being buried in their hometowns, and when a person dies in a land that is not their hometown, their family members hire a sorcerer to bring back their deceased family member. The family commissions the sorcerer in their village to travel to the place of the person's death, locate the corpse, and to write a spell and stick it upon the corpse's face. The spell-paper contains their name, birthdate, and some other words to reanimate the corpse. Once the paper is stuck upon the corpses' face, the newly created jiangshi would follow the sorcerer by hopping around, and the sorcerer would lead it back to its hometown for burial (this was often a last-resort choice used by families with not enough money to hire a cart to carry the corpse back). Usually, the sorcerer would travel by night, and would at least have around three jiangshi traveling with it. But when the written spell-paper falls or is pulled off of the jiangshi (in the case the sorcerer is not paid the agreed amount for his doings, he might rip off the jiangshi's spell-paper), it gains its own consciousness, and all the power that the sorcerer formerly had over it would be lost. Instead of being an obedient corpse that followed the sorcerer, the jiangshi would be rampant and dangerous. The freed jiangshi would begin killing living creatures to absorb life essence (qì) from their victims. They are said to be created when a person's soul (魄 pò) fails to leave the deceased's body.

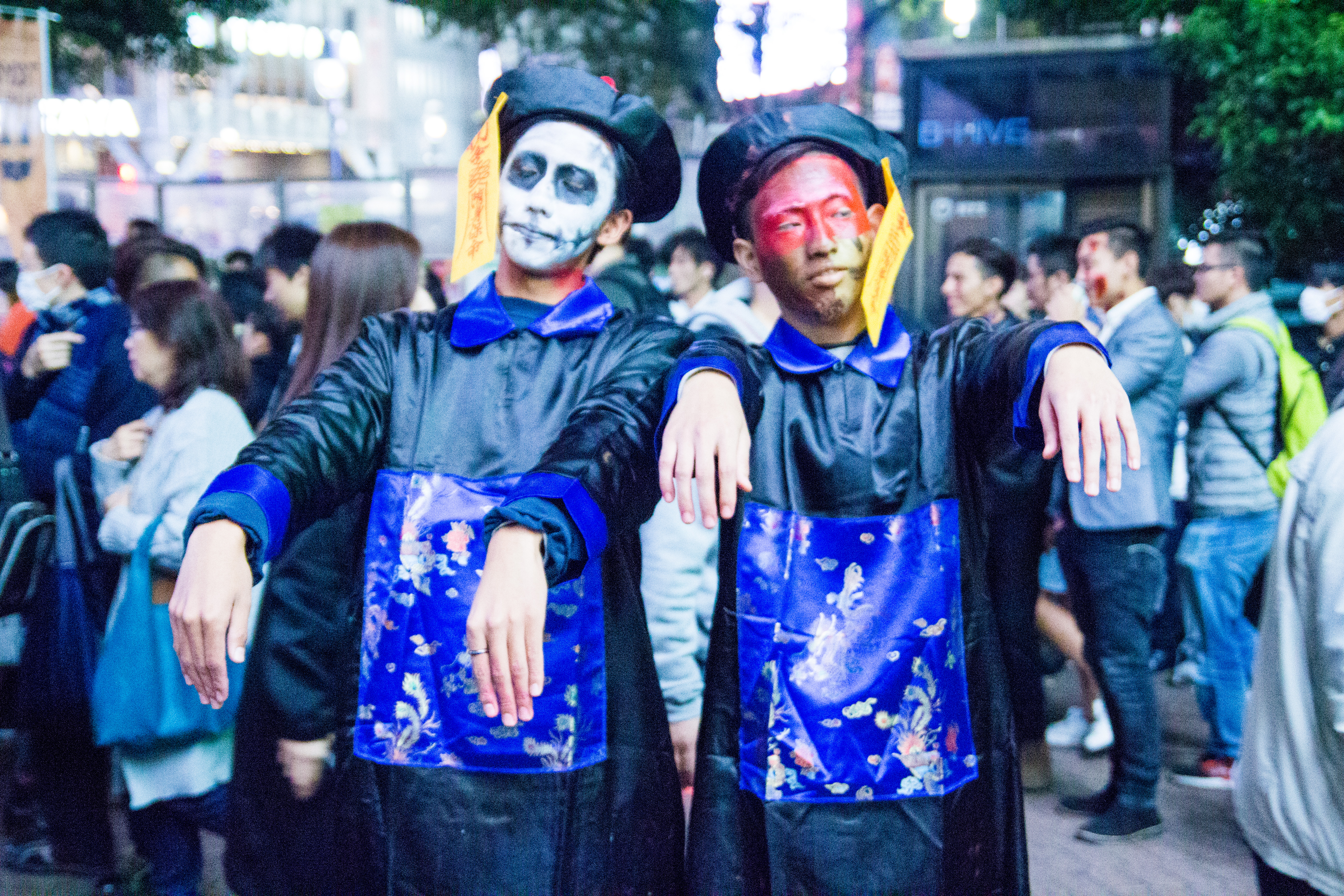
A typical portrayal of a Jiangshi

Some unusual features of the Chinese vampire include its long, curved fingernails, perhaps derived from the appearance of growing fingernails on corpses due to flesh recession, and its greenish-white furry skin, perhaps derived from fungus or mould growing on corpses. Jiangshi legends have inspired a genre of jiangshi films and literature in Hong Kong and East Asia. Films like Encounters of the Spooky Kind and Mr. Vampire were released during the jiangshi cinematic boom of the 1980s and 1990s.

The motif of the Western-style vampire entered China in the early 20th century.

==== India ====
In India, tales of vetalas, ghoul-like beings that inhabit corpses, are found in old Sanskrit folklore. Although most vetala legends have been compiled in the Betal Panchabingshati, a prominent story in the Kathasaritsagara tells of King Vikramāditya and his nightly quests to capture an elusive one. The Betal is described as an undead creature who, like the bat associated with modern-day vampirism, hangs upside down on trees found on cremation grounds and cemeteries. Pishacha, the returned spirits of evil-doers or those who died insane, also bear vampiric attributes.

==== Malaysia and Indonesia ====
The Malaysian Penanggalan may be either a beautiful old or young woman who obtained her beauty through the active use of black magic or other unnatural means, and is most commonly described in local folklores to be dark or demonic in nature. She is able to detach her fanged head which flies around in the night looking for blood, typically from pregnant women. Malaysians would hang a local plant around the doors and windows of houses, hoping the penanggalan would not enter for fear of catching its intestines on the thorns. The Leyak is a similar being from Balinese folklore. A Pontianak, Kuntilanak or Matianak in Indonesia, or Langsuir in Malaysia, is a woman who died during childbirth and became undead, seeking revenge and terrorizing villages. She appeared as an attractive woman with long black hair that covered a hole in the back of her neck, which she sucked the blood of children with. Filling the hole with her hair would drive her off. Corpses had their mouths filled with glass beads, eggs under each armpit, and needles in their palms to prevent them from becoming langsuir.

==== Philippines ====
Legends of female vampire-like beings who can detach parts of their upper body occur in the Philippines (and also in Malaysia, Cambodia and Indonesia). There are two main vampire-like creatures in the Philippines: the Tagalog Mandurugo ('blood-sucker') and the Visayan manananggal ('self-segmenter'). The mandurugo is a variety of the aswang that takes the form of an attractive girl by day, and develops wings and a long, hollow, thread-like tongue by night. They use an elongated proboscis-like tongue to suck fetuses off pregnant women. They also prefer to eat entrails (specifically the heart and the liver) and the phlegm of sick people. The manananggal is described as being an older, beautiful woman capable of severing its upper torso in order to fly into the night with huge bat-like wings and prey on unsuspecting, sleeping pregnant women in their homes. The tongue is used to suck up blood from a sleeping victim.

==== Sri Lanka ====
The belief of Riri Yaka (Blood Demon) can be found in Sri Lanka. According to mythology, he tore his mother's breast and emerged into the human world as a demon, killing her. The demon is said to give a primary form and eight other manifestations. In most cases he is said to be a giant who towers over his human victims. In the primary form, his face is blue and splotched with blood. Red rays radiate from his bloodshot eyes. Blood pours from his nostrils and smoke billows from his ears. His mouth is filled with decomposing human flesh and his breath is foul. His entire body is coloured scarlet with dripping blood. He is closely associated with Mara, the demon king of death.

== Europe ==
The 12th-century English historians and chroniclers Walter Map and William of Newburgh recorded accounts of revenants, though records in English legends of vampiric beings after this date are scant. These tales are similar to the later folklore widely reported from Southeastern Europe and Transylvania in the 18th century, which were the basis of the vampire legend that later entered Germany and England, where they were subsequently embellished and popularised.

In the 18th century, there was a frenzy of vampire sightings in Southeastern Europe and Transylvania, with frequent stakings and grave diggings taking place to identify and kill the potential revenants; even government officials were compelled into the hunting and staking of vampires. These things can be physically harmed, as with humans, but then they can also pass through walls and do unnatural things that normal beings can't, so people believe that disabling the corpse can end these vampiric activities, hence the superstitious custom of mutilating the dead buried bodies of potential revenants. Despite this age being called the Age of Enlightenment, during which most folkloric legends were quelled, the belief in vampires increased dramatically, resulting in what could only be called a mass hysteria throughout most of Europe. The panic began with an outbreak of alleged vampire attacks in East Prussia in 1721 and in the Habsburg monarchy from 1725 to 1734, which spread to other localities. Two famous vampire cases, which were the first to be officially recorded, involved the corpses of Petar Blagojevich and Arnold Paole from Serbia. Blagojevich was reported to have died at the age of 62, but allegedly returned after his death asking his son for food. When the son refused, he was found dead the following day. Blagojevich soon supposedly returned and attacked some neighbours who died from loss of blood. In the second case, Arnold Paole, an ex-soldier turned farmer who allegedly was attacked by a vampire years before, died while haying. After his death, people began to die in the surrounding area and it was widely believed that Paole had returned to prey on the neighbours.

The two incidents were well-documented: government officials examined the bodies, wrote case reports, and published books throughout Europe. The hysteria, which is commonly referred to as the "18th-Century Vampire Controversy", raged for a generation. The problem was exacerbated by rural epidemics of so-claimed vampire attacks, undoubtedly caused by the higher amount of superstition that was present in village communities, with locals digging up bodies and in some cases, staking them. Although many scholars reported during this period that vampires did not exist, and attributed reports to premature burial or rabies, superstitious belief continued to increase. Dom Augustine Calmet, a well-respected French theologian and scholar, put together a comprehensive treatise in 1746, which was ambiguous concerning the existence of vampires. Calmet amassed reports of vampire incidents; numerous readers, including both a critical Voltaire and supportive demonologists, interpreted the treatise as claiming that vampires existed. In his Philosophical Dictionary, Voltaire wrote:

These vampires were corpses, who went out of their graves at night to suck the blood of the living, either at their throats or stomachs, after which they returned to their cemeteries. The persons so sucked waned, grew pale, and fell into consumption; while the sucking corpses grew fat, got rosy, and enjoyed an excellent appetite. It was in Poland, Hungary, Silesia, Moravia, Austria, and Lorraine, that the dead made this good cheer.

The controversy only ceased when Empress Maria Theresa of Austria sent her personal physician, Gerhard van Swieten, to investigate the claims of vampiric entities. He concluded that vampires did not exist and the Empress passed laws prohibiting the opening of graves and desecration of bodies, sounding the end of the vampire epidemics. Despite this condemnation, the vampire lived on in artistic works and in local superstition.

=== Armenia ===
In Armenian mythology, the most prominent vampire is the dakhanavar. The dakhanavar (դախանավար) is a vampire in Armenian folklore who protected the valley from intruders, first reported by Baron August von Haxthausen in his mid-19th century account of Armenia and Russian Transcaucasia, the book Transcaucasia: Sketches of the Nations and Races Between the Black Sea and the Caspian. The Dakhanavar follows travelers until they stop for a rest, stalking their every move. When they finally stop, the vampire attacks them in their sleep, typically going for their feet. The local legend would often attack travelers in the night, sucking blood from their feet. In one legend, he was outsmarted by two men who had already heard of the vampire's habits and slept with their feet under the other's head. The vampire, thinking that they were one being with two heads and no feet, ran from the valley and was never heard from again. In line with common vampire folklore, Jonathan Maberry has identified garlic as an apotropaic which can protect against the Dakhanavar.

=== Albania ===
There are some vampire creatures in Albanian mythology. They include shtriga, lugat and dhampir. Shtriga is a vampiric witch in traditional Albanian folklore that sucks the blood of infants at night while they sleep, and then turns into a flying insect (traditionally a moth, fly or bee). Only the shtriga herself could cure those she had drained. The shtriga is often pictured as a woman with a hateful stare (sometimes wearing a cape) and a horribly disfigured face. The male noun for shtriga is shtrigu or shtrigan. Edith Durham recorded several methods traditionally considered effective for defending oneself from shtriga. A cross made of pig bone could be placed at the entrance of a church on Easter Sunday, rendering any shtriga inside unable to leave. They could then be captured and killed at the threshold as they vainly attempted to pass. She further recorded the story that after draining blood from a victim, the shtriga would generally go off into the woods and regurgitate it. If a silver coin were to be soaked in that blood and wrapped in cloth, it would become an amulet offering permanent protection from any shtriga.

=== Greece ===
==== Ancient Greece ====
Ancient Greek mythology contains several precursors to modern vampires, though none were considered undead; these included the Empusa, Lamia, and striges (the strix of Ancient Roman mythology). Over time, the first two terms became general words to describe witches and demons respectively. Empusa was the daughter of the goddess Hecate and was described as a demonic, bronze-footed creature. She feasted on blood by transforming into a young woman and seduced men as they slept before drinking their blood. Lamia was the daughter of King Belus and a secret lover of Zeus. However Zeus' wife Hera discovered this infidelity and killed all Lamia's offspring; Lamia swore vengeance and preyed on young children in their beds at night, sucking their blood. Like Lamia, the striges feasted on children, but also preyed on adults. They were described as having the bodies of crows or birds in general, and were later incorporated into Roman mythology as strix, a kind of nocturnal bird that fed on human flesh and blood. The Romanian vampire breed named Strigoï has no direct relation to the Greek striges, but was derived from the Roman term strix, as is the name of the Albanian Shtriga and the Slavic Strzyga, though myths about these creatures are more similar to their Slavic equivalents. Greek vampiric entities are seen once again in Homer's epic Odyssey. In Homer's tale, the undead are too insubstantial to be heard by the living and cannot communicate with them without drinking blood first. In the epic, when Odysseus journeyed into Hades, he was made to sacrifice a black ram and a black ewe so that the shades there could drink its blood and communicate.

==== Modern Greece ====
Bearing little resemblance to its Ancient Greek precursors, the modern Greek vrykolakas (from a Slavic word meaning 'werewolf') has much in common with the European vampire. Belief in vampires commonly called βρυκόλακας, vrykolakas, though also referred to as καταχανάδες, katakhanades, on Crete persisted throughout Greek history and became so widespread in the 18th and 19th centuries that many practices were enforced to both prevent and combat vampirism. The deceased were often exhumed from their graves after three years of death and the remains placed in a box by relatives; wine was poured over them while a priest would read from scriptures. However, if the body had not sufficiently decayed, the corpse would be labeled a vrykolakas and dealt with appropriately.

In Greek folklore, vampirism could occur through various means: being excommunicated, desecrating a religious day, committing a great crime, or dying alone. Other causes included having a cat jump across one's grave, eating meat from a sheep killed by a wolf, and being cursed. Vrykolakas were usually thought to be indistinguishable from living people, giving rise to many folk tales with this theme. Crosses and antidoron (blessed bread) from the church were used as wards in different places. To prevent vampires from rising from the dead, their hearts were pierced with iron nails while resting in their graves, or their bodies burned and the ashes scattered. Because the Church opposed burning people who had received the myron of chrismation in the baptism ritual, cremation was considered a last resort.

=== Iceland ===
The Icelandic draugur (plural draugar) is usually translated as 'ghost', but unlike mainland ghosts Icelandic undead were believed to be corporeal. Icelandic scholars such as Úlfhildur Dagsdóttir and Ármann Jakobsson have argued that the Icelandic draugur has more in common with the eastern-European vampire than it has with most beings categorized as ghosts. According to Ármann medieval Icelandic undead can be put into two categories, the first being varðmenn or guardians, which are undead that stay in a certain place, usually their burial mound or home, and protect it and their treasures from thieves and trespassers. These draugar are depicted as being driven by greed and unwillingness to part with their worldly belongings and are in many ways similar to dragons. The second category are tilberadraugar (a tilberi is a type of undead in Icelandic folklore, a human rib given life by drinking the blood of a witch and then sent out to steal milk and money), parasitic ghosts who roam the earth and harass the living and try to drive them mad or even kill them, often by dragging them into their graves, and thereby turn their victims into more draugar. This comparison of Icelandic draugar to vampires is not entirely new as it was also made by Andrew Lang in 1897 when he called the draugur Glámr in Grettir's Saga a vampire.

=== Romania ===
Romanian vampires were known as moroi (from the Romanian word mort meaning 'dead' or the Slavic word meaning 'nightmare') and strigoi, with the latter classified as either living or dead. Live strigoi were described as living witches with two hearts or souls, sometimes both. Strigoi were said to have the ability to send out their souls at night to meet with other strigoi and consume the blood of livestock and neighbours. Similarly, dead strigoi were described as reanimated corpses that also sucked blood and attacked their living family. Live strigoi became revenants after their death, but there were also many other ways of a person becoming a vampire. A person "born in the caul," or with congenital defects, such as an extra nipple, a tail, or extra hair was doomed to become a vampire. The same fate applied to the seventh child in any family if all of his or her previous siblings were of the same sex, as well as someone born too early or someone whose mother had encountered a black cat crossing her path. If a pregnant woman did not eat salt or was looked upon by a vampire or a witch, her child would also become a vampire. So too would a child born out of wedlock. Others who were at risk of becoming vampires were those who died an unnatural death or before baptism. A person with red hair and blue eyes was seen as a potential strigoi. A child breastfed after its mother has weaned it risks becoming a pricolici, a Romanian vampire with werewolf-like attributes.

Romanian vampires were said to bite their victims over the heart or between the eyes, and sudden deaths could indicate the presence of a vampire. Graves were often opened five or seven years after burial and the corpse checked for vampirism, before being washed and reburied.

=== Ireland and Scotland ===
The malign and succubus-like Baobhan sith from the Scottish Highlands and the Lhiannan Shee of the Isle of Man, Scotland and Ireland, are two fairy spirits with decidedly vampiric tendencies. Further Irish myths, alone or in combination, may have provided inspiration for Irish authors Sheridan Le Fanu and Bram Stoker

- The legend of Droch-fhuil (literally 'evil-blood'), and the Castle of Droch-fhola (Dún Droch-fhola) which guarded the MacGillycuddy's Reeks Mountains of County Kerry
- The legend of Abhartach – an evil tyrant who repeatedly escapes his grave to spread terror (and in some accounts to drink the blood of his subjects, to be one of the neamh-mairbh ('un-dead'), and to be killed only with a sword of yew wood and being buried upside-down).
- The legend of the Gancanagh or Ganconer, a seductive male fairy who is said to entrance and kill young women. Like the vampire he is said to cast no shadow, and is unable to enter a home unless invited inside, and is repelled by the sign of the cross.

=== Slavic Europe ===
Some of the more common causes of vampirism in Slavic folklore include being a magician or an immoral person; suffering an "unnatural" or untimely death such as suicide; ex-communication; improper burial rituals; an animal jumping or a bird flying over the corpse or the empty grave (in Serbian folk belief); and even being born with a caul, teeth, or tail. In southern Russia, people who were known to talk to themselves were believed to be at risk of becoming vampires. Slavic vampires were able to appear as butterflies, echoing an earlier belief of the butterfly symbolizing a departed soul. Some traditions spoke of "living vampires" or "people with two souls", a kind of witch capable of leaving its body and engaging in harmful and vampiric activity while sleeping.

Two of the earliest historical recordings of vampire activity in Europe can be found in the Neplach's Chronicle (14th century, probably written in 1360). For the year 1336 he mentions a shepherd named Myslata from Blov. He died and was buried but he didn't stay in the grave. Each evening he walked around, spoke to people as if being alive and was scaring them. Soon, he started killing the people and if he stopped by someone's home and called their name, said person died in 8 days. So the people of several villages decided to exhumate him and burn the body. During the process, he let out a loud scream. Someone stabbed him with a stick and a lot of blood came out of the wound. After he was burned, all of the evil events stopped. The second case happened 1344. Neplach writes about a woman from Levín who after being buried came back, killed several people and danced on them. Once she was exhumated and a stake was put through her, blood started pouring out of her as if she was alive. She also ate her clothes and once removed from her mouth, the cloth was bloody as well. Even after that, she was still attacking villagers so they decided to burn her. However, the wood wouldn't catch fire until they used pieces of the church roof to start it. Both of these cases were later mentioned in the book Magia posthuma by Karl Ferdinand Schertz (1704) that intended to denounce the widespread folk belief in vampires.

Among the beliefs of the East Slavs, those of the northern regions (i.e. most of Russia) are unique in that their undead, while having many of the features of the vampires of other Slavic peoples, do not drink blood and do not bear a name derived from the common Slavic root for "vampire". Ukrainian and Belarusian legends are more "conventional", although in Ukraine the vampires may sometimes not be described as dead at all, or may be seen as engaging in vampirism long before death. Ukrainian folklore also described vampires as having red faces and tiny tails. During cholera epidemics in the 19th century, there were cases of people being burned alive by their neighbors on charges of being vampires.

In South Slavic folklore, a vampire was believed to pass through several distinct stages in its development. The first 40 days were considered decisive for the making of a vampire; it started out as an invisible shadow and then gradually gained strength from the lifeblood of the living, forming a (typically invisible) jelly-like, boneless mass, and eventually building up a human-like body nearly identical to the one the person had in life. This development allowed the creature to ultimately leave its grave and begin a new life as a human. The vampire, who was usually male, was also sexually active and could have children, either with his widow or a new wife. These could become vampires themselves, but could also have a special ability to see and kill vampires, allowing them to become vampire hunters.

The same talent was believed to be found in persons born on Saturday. In the Dalmatian region of Croatia, there is a female vampire called a Mora or Morana, who drinks the blood of men, and also the kuzlac/kozlak who are the recent-dead "who have not lived piously." They can be men or women who show themselves at crossroads, bridges, caves, and graveyards and frighten the locals by terrorizing their homes and drinking their blood. To be killed, a wooden stake must be thrust through them.

In Bulgaria from the Middle Ages through to the beginning of the 20th century, it was a common practice to pin corpses through the heart with an iron stake to prevent their return as a vampire.

In Croatia, Slovenia, the Czech Republic, and Slovakia, a type of vampire called pijavica, which literally translates to 'leech', is used to describe a vampire who has led an evil and sinful life as a human and in turn, becomes a powerfully strong, cold-blooded killer. Incest, especially between mother and son, is one of the ways in which a pijavica can be created, and then it usually comes back to victimize its former family, who can only protect their homes by placing mashed garlic and wine at their windows and thresholds to keep it from entering. It can only be killed by fire while awake and by using the Rite of Exorcism if found in its grave during the day.

To ward off the threat of vampires and disease, twin brothers would yoke twin oxen to a plow and make a furrow with it around their village. An egg would be broken and a nail driven into the floor beneath the bier of the house of a recently deceased person. Two or three elderly women would attend the cemetery the evening after the funeral and stick five hawthorn pegs or old knives into the grave: one at the position of the deceased's chest, and the other four at the positions of his arms and legs. Other texts maintain that running backwards uphill with a lit candle and a turtle would ward off a stalking vampire. Alternately, they may surround the grave with a red woolen thread, ignite the thread, and wait until it was burnt up. If a noise was heard at night and suspected to be made by a vampire sneaking around someone's house, one would shout "Come tomorrow, and I will give you some salt," or "Go, pal, get some fish, and come back."

One of the earliest recordings of vampire activity came from the region of Istria in modern Croatia, in 1672. Local reports cited the local vampire Giure Grando of the village Kringa near Tinjan as the cause of panic among the villagers. A former peasant, Guire died in 1656; however, local villagers claimed he returned from the dead and began drinking blood from the people and sexually harassing his widow. The village leader ordered a stake to be driven through his heart, but when the method failed to kill him, he was subsequently beheaded with better results.

Among the Romani people, mullo (literally one who is dead) are believed to return from the dead and cause malicious acts as well as drink human blood, most often that of a relative or the person who had caused their death. Other potential victims were those who did not properly observe the burial ceremonies or kept the deceased's possessions instead of properly destroying them. Female vampires could return, lead a normal life and even marry but would eventually exhaust the husband with their sexual appetite. Similar to other European beliefs, male vampires could father children, known as dhampirs, who could be hired to detect and get rid of vampires.

Anyone who had a horrible appearance, was missing a finger, or had appendages similar to those of an animal was believed to be a vampire. A person who died alone and unseen would become a vampire, likewise if a corpse swelled or turned black before burial. Dogs, cats, plants or even agricultural tools could become vampires; pumpkins or melons kept in the house too long would start to move, make noises or show blood. According to the late Serbian ethnologist Tatomir Vukanović, Roma people in Kosovo believed that vampires were invisible to most people, but could be seen by a twin brother and sister born on a Saturday who wore their clothes inside out. Likewise, a settlement could be protected by finding twins who could also see the vampire outdoors at night, who would have to flee immediately after they spotted it.

=== Spain ===
In Spain, there are several traditions about beings with vampiric tendencies. In Asturias, the Guaxa is one such being, which is described as an old vampire who bites with his single tooth and sucks the blood of his victims. The Cantabria equivalent exists by the name of Guajona. In Catalonia exists the legend of the Dip, an evil vampire dog and the fearsome Count Estruch, one of the oldest vampire tales in European history. In the Canary Islands, there was also a belief in vampiric beings, in the form of a blood-sucking witch. One such example is provided by the legend of the Witches of Anaga in Tenerife.

== Africa ==
Various regions of Africa have folkloric tales of beings with vampiric abilities: in West Africa the Ashanti people tell of the iron-toothed and tree-dwelling asanbosam, and the Ewe people of the adze, which can take the form of a firefly and hunts children. The Eastern Cape region of South Africa has the impundulu, which can take the form of a large taloned bird and can summon thunder and lightning, and the Betsileo people of Madagascar tell of the ramanga, an outlaw or living vampire who drinks the blood and eats the nail clippings of nobles.

== Americas ==
Female vampire-like monsters are the Soucouyant of Trinidad, and the Tunda and Patasola of Colombian folklore, while the Mapuche of southern Chile have the bloodsucking snake known as the Peuchen. Aloe vera hung backwards behind or near a door was thought to ward off vampiric beings in South American superstition. Aztec mythology described tales of the Cihuateteo, skeletal-faced spirits of those who died in childbirth. While otherwise considered equal in honor to warriors slain in battle (and believed to guide the sun along with said warriors), they returned on specific days as terrifying entities. If not appeased, it was believed that they stole children and entered into sexual liaisons with the living, driving them mad.

The rougarou is an example of how a vampire belief can result from a combination of beliefs, here a mixture of French and African Vodu or voodoo. The term Rougarou possibly comes from the French loup-garou (meaning 'werewolf') and is common in the culture of Mauritius. However, the stories of the rougarou are widespread through the Caribbean Islands and Louisiana in the United States. During the late 18th and 19th centuries, there was a widespread belief in vampires in parts of New England, particularly in Rhode Island and Eastern Connecticut. There are many documented cases of families disinterring loved ones and removing their hearts in the belief that the deceased was a vampire who was responsible for sickness and death in the family, although the term "vampire" was never actually used to describe the deceased. The deadly disease tuberculosis, or "consumption" as it was known at the time, was believed to be caused by nightly visitations on the part of a dead family member who had died of consumption themselves. The most famous, and most recently recorded, case of suspected vampirism is that of nineteen-year-old Mercy Brown, who died in Exeter, Rhode Island in 1892. Her father, assisted by the family physician, removed her from her tomb two months after her death and her heart was cut out and burnt to ashes.

Among the Wyandots was the legend of the Hooh-Strah-Dooh. A cross between what current fiction/legends portray as zombies and vampires, the Hooh-Strah-Dooh was an evil spirit that inhabited recently dead bodies and caused the corpse to rise and devour the living. The redbud was believed to be an effective ward.

== Folktales ==
Folklorist and scholar Stith Thompson noted two tale types that closely resemble legends about vampires:

- Aarne-Thompson-Uther Index ATU 307, "The Princess in the Shroud" or "The Princess in the Coffin": a cursed princess or woman comes out of her grave or coffin at night to attack people. Examples: The Princess in the Chest; La Ramée and the Phantom; Viy (story)
- Aarne-Thompson-Uther Index ATU 363, "The Vampire" or "The Corpse-Eater": a girl marries a mysterious man. During their way home, they stop by a church and the man enters it. Worried about his long absence, the woman follows him and sees him devouring a corpse. Example: The Fiend (Upyr), Russian folktale.

In Thompson's Motif-Index of Folk-Literature, the vampire appears in the classification as Motif "E.251.Vampires".

== See also ==
- List of vampires in folklore and mythology
