= Aos Sí =

Supernatural race in Irish and Scottish mythology

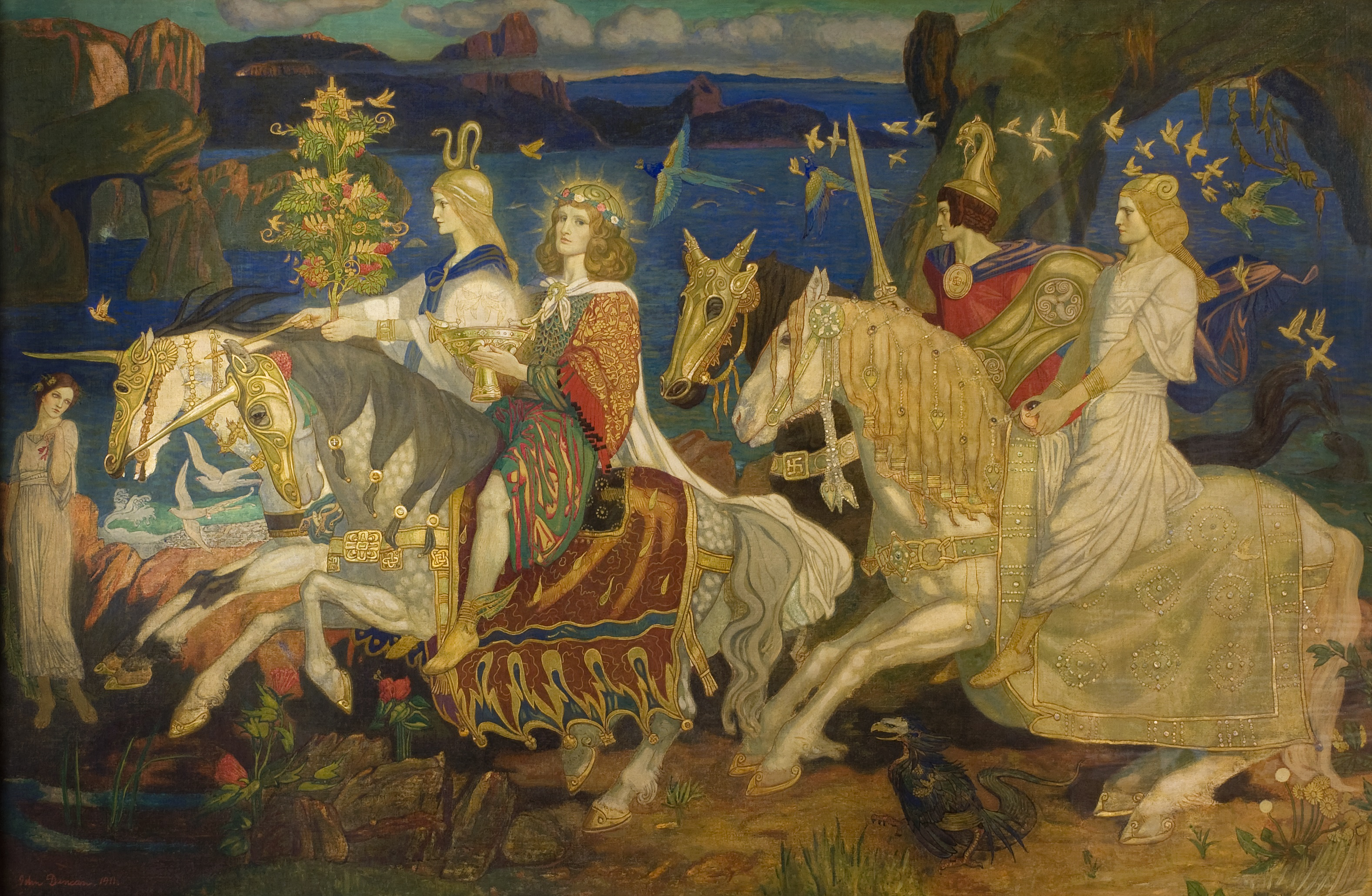
Riders of the Sidhe (1911), painting by John Duncan

Aos sí or aos sídhe (pronounced [iːsˠ ˈʃiː]; English approximation: /iːs ˈʃiː/ eess SHEE) is the Irish name for a supernatural race in Gaelic folklore, similar to elves. They are said to descend from the Tuatha Dé Danann or the gods of Irish mythology.

The term aos sí means "folk of the sí"; these are the mounds in which they are said to dwell, which are seen as portals to an Otherworld. Such abodes are referred to in English as "shees", "fairy mounds", "elf mounds" or "hollow hills". The aos sí interact with humans and the human world. They are variously said to be the ancestors, the spirits of nature, or goddesses and gods.

== Etymology ==
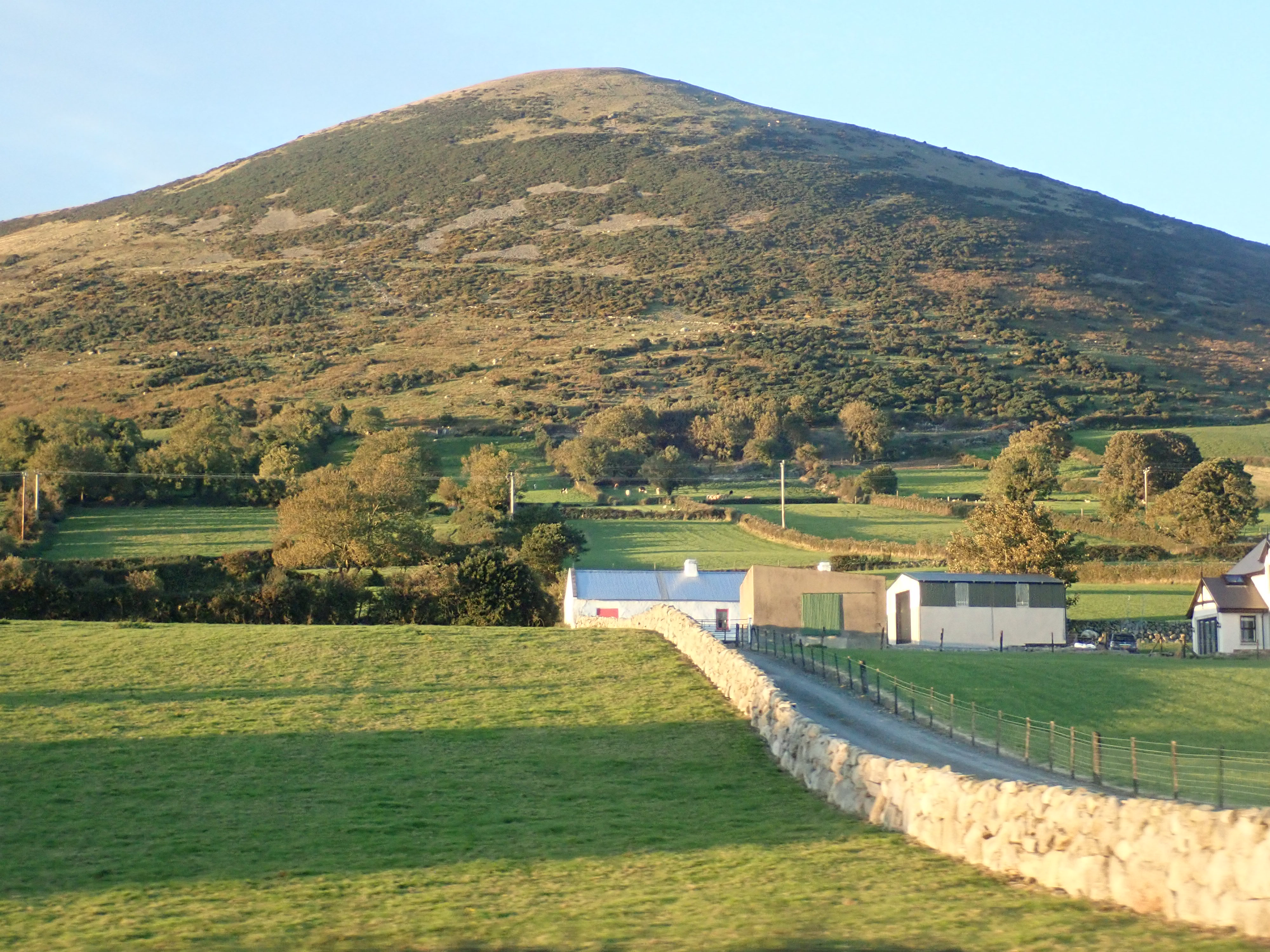
Knockshee, County Down, known in Irish as Cnoc Sí ("hill of the fairy mound")

The term aos sídhe (in reformed spelling, aos sí) derives from aos, meaning "people", and sídhe, the genitive form of síodh, meaning "fairy mound" (cf. Old Irish áes síde). The latter word derives from proto-Celtic *sīdos ("abode"), and is related to the English words "seat" and "settle". Another name for the aos sí is daoine sí, which likewise means "people of the fairy mound". The same terms exist in Scottish Gaelic as aos-sìthe and daoine-sìthe. An individual member of the aos sí may be called a síog, anglicised as "sheogue".

The aos sídhe are commonly referred to in English simply as "the Sidhe", a usage that is not paralleled in Irish.

== In medieval literature ==
In medieval Irish literature, the names aes síde and fír síde (folk of the síd) are equivalent to the terms Tuath Dé and Tuatha Dé Danann. The only difference is that Tuath Dé tends to be used in contexts of legendary history and mythology.

Writing in the 7th century, the Irish bishop Tírechán described the sídh folk as "earthly gods" (Latin: dei terreni). The 8th century Fiacc's Hymn says that the Irish adored the sídh folk before the coming of Saint Patrick.

== In Irish folklore ==
Due to the oral nature of Irish folklore, the exact origins of the fairies are not well defined. There are enough stories to support two possible origins. The fairies could either be fallen angels or the descendants of the Tuatha Dé Danann; in the latter case, this is equivalent with aos sí. In the former case, it is said that the fairies are angels who have fallen from heaven, but whose sins were not great enough to warrant hell. In many Gaelic tales, the aos sí are later literary versions of the Tuatha Dé Danann—the deities and deified ancestors of Irish mythology. Some sources describe them as the survivors of the Tuath Dé who retreated into the Otherworld when fleeing the mortal Sons of Míl Espáine who, like many other early invaders of Ireland, came from Iberia. As part of the terms of their surrender to the Sons of Míl, the Tuath Dé agreed to retreat and dwell underground.

In folk belief and practice, the aos sí are often appeased with offerings and care is taken to avoid angering or insulting them. Often, they are not named directly, but rather spoken of as "The Good Neighbours", "The Fair Folk", or simply "The Folk". The aos sí are generally described as stunningly beautiful, though they can also be terrible and hideous.

Aos sí are seen as fierce guardians of their abodes—whether a fairy mound, fairy hill, fairy ring, a special tree (often a whitethorn) or a particular lake or wood. It is believed that infringing on these spaces will cause the aos sí to retaliate in an effort to remove the people or objects that invaded their homes. Many of these tales contribute to the changeling myth in west European folklore, with the aos sí kidnapping trespassers or replacing their children with changelings as a punishment for transgressing.

The aos sí are often connected to certain times of year. The thresholds of the seasons, especially Samhain (November Eve) at the start of winter and Bealtaine (May Eve) at the start of summer, are seen as liminal times when the barrier between this world and the Otherworld can more easily be crossed. This meant the aos sí were particularly active in our world. At Samhain, for example, it was believed that the aos sí needed to be propitiated to ensure that people and livestock survived the winter. Offerings of food and drink would be left as an offering for the aos sí, such as at 'fairy trees', and small portions of the crops were left in the ground for them. At Bealtaine, dairy products were thought to be especially at risk from the aos sí. May flowers were tied to milk pails or the tails of cattle to ensure the cattle's milk was not stolen, or three black coals might be placed under a butter churn to ensure the fairies did not steal the butter. Cattle would be brought to 'fairy forts', where a small amount of their blood would be collected. The owners would then pour it into the earth with prayers for the herd's safety.

It was also believed that anyone travelling on these nights could be led astray or taken by the fairies. People took special care not to offend the aos sí and sought to ward off any out to cause mischief. They stayed near to home or, if forced to walk in the darkness, turned their clothing inside-out to disguise themselves, or carried iron or salt to keep them at bay.

=== The sídhe ===
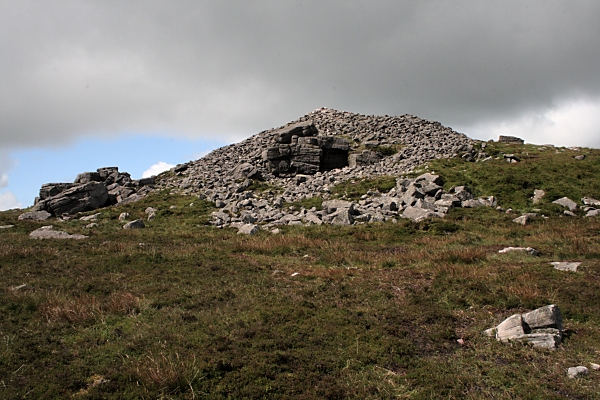
Sí ar Feimhin, the burial cairn on Slievenamon

A sídh (anglicised "shee") is a mound or tumulus associated with the aos sí. In modern Irish, the word is sí (plural síthe); in Scottish Gaelic it is sìth (plural sìthean); in Old Irish it is síd (plural síde). These sídhe are referred to in English as "fairy mounds", "elf mounds" or "hollow hills".

In some later English-language texts, the word sídhe is incorrectly used both for the mounds and the people of the mounds. For example, W. B. Yeats, writing in 1908, referred to the aos sí simply as "the sídhe". However, sidh in older texts refers specifically to "the palaces, courts, halls or residences" of the otherworldly beings that supposedly inhabit them.

=== Other names in Irish folklore ===
The aos sí are known by many names in Ireland, among them:

- Aingil Anúabhair: "Proud angels"
- Daoine Uaisle: "The noble folk"
- Daoine maithe: "Good people"
- Deamhan Aerig: "Air demons"
- Dream Anúabhair: "Excessively proud [people]"
- Sídhfir: "fairy men"
- Sídheógaídhe: "Young Moundlings"
- Slúagh Cille: "Host of the churchyard"
- Slúagh na Marbh: "Host of the dead"
- Slúagh Sídhe: "Mound host"
- Slúagh-Sídhe-Thúatha-Dé-Danann: "Mound host of the Túatha Dé Danann"
- na Uaisle: "The noble" or "The gentry"

== Types ==
The term "banshee" or bean sídhe, meaning "woman of the fairy mound", has come to denote any supernatural woman of Ireland who announces a coming death by wailing and keening. Her counterpart in Scottish mythology is the bean-sìthe. Other varieties of aos sí and daoine sìth include the Scottish bean-nighe (the washerwoman who is seen washing the bloody clothing or armour of the person who is doomed to die), the leanan sídhe (the "fairy lover"), the cat-sìth (a fairy cat), and the cù-sìth (a fairy dog).

The sluagh sídhe—"the fairy host"—is sometimes depicted in Irish and Scottish lore as a crowd of airborne spirits, perhaps the cursed, evil or restless dead. The siabhra (anglicised as "sheevra"), may be a type of these lesser spirits, prone to evil and mischief. However, an Ulster folk song also uses "sheevra" simply to mean "spirit" or "fairy".

=== List ===
- Abarta
- Abhartach
- Alp-luachra
- Bean-nighe/Caoineag
- Banshee
- Cat-sìth
- Cù-sìth
- Changeling
- Clíodhna
- Clurichaun
- Dobhar-chú
- Dullahan
- Ellén Trechend
- Fachan
- Far darrig
- Fear gorta
- Am Fear Liath Mòr
- Fetch
- Fuath
- Gancanagh
- Ghillie Dhu / Gille Dubh
- Glaistig/Glashtyn
- Leanan sídhe
- Leprechaun
- Merrow
- Oilliphéist
- Púca
- Selkie
- Sluagh

== Creideamh Sí ==
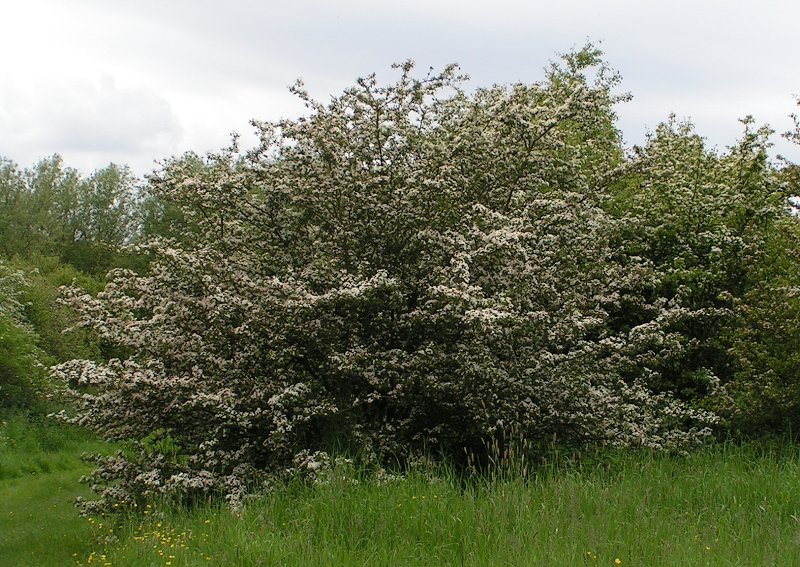
Hawthorn tree, considered in local Irish lore (and Celtic folklore in general) to be sacred to the aos sí

Creideamh Sí is Irish for the "Fairy Faith", a term for the collection of beliefs and practices observed by those who wish to keep good relationships with the aos sí and avoid angering them. General belief in the Celtic otherworld, the existence of aos sí and the ability of the aos sí to influence the local area and its people are all beliefs characteristic of the Creideamh Sí. It is characterised as an aspect of Irish popular religion and exists syncretically with folk Christianity.

Effort is made by those who believe to appease local aos sí through food and drink. The custom of offering milk and traditional foods—such as baked goods, apples or berries—to the aos sí has survived through the Christian era into the present day in parts of Ireland, Scotland and the diaspora. Those who maintain some degree of belief in the aos sí also are careful to leave their sacred places alone and protect them from damage through road or housing construction.

== See also ==
- Edmund Lenihan
- Enchanted Moura
- Fairy riding
- Fir Bolg
- Jinn (Arab mythical being)
- Kami
- Otherworld
- Seiðr
- Strontian
