= Palis =

Palis may refer to:

- Pâlis, a former commune in the Aube department in north-central France
- Palis (mythology), a type of vampiric creature in Arabic and Persian folklore
- Palis (surname), a French, Spanish, or Portuguese surname
