= Marusia =

Marusia, Marusja, or Marusya may refer to:

People

- Marusia Churai (1625–1653), Ukrainian Baroque composer, poet, and singer
- Marusya Klimova (born 1961), Russian writer and translator
- Maria Nikiforova, widely known as Marusya (1885–1919), Ukrainian anarchist partisan leader
- Marusya Ivanova Lyubcheva (born 1949), Bulgarian politician

Fictional characters

- Marusia, a character in The Fiend
- Marusja, a character in The Magic Mountain

Other

- Marusia massacre 1925 Chilean government crackdown during a mining strike
- Letters from Marusia, 1976 Mexican film based on the Marusia massacre

== See also ==
- Maruša, Slovene cognate
