= Obayifo =

Mythical West African vampire

An obayifo is a vampire/witch-like mythological creature from West Africa coming from the folklore of the Akan people.

In Ashanti folklore, obayifo are very common and may inhabit the bodies of any man or woman. They are described as having shifty eyes and being obsessed with food. At night they are said to be able to travel as balls of phosphorescent light or fire. They were said to suck out the blood of their human (often child) victims, as well as sucking juice from fruits.

The obayifo is known as a similar entity to the asiman by the Dahomey people, a creature that can shapeshift and fly, also turning itself into a ball of light and hunting for prey in the night sky.

In wider Akan folklore, the obayifo is believed to be a witch. In this tradition, the witch is typically a woman, whose ire is specifically focussed on those they have an intimate relationship with, usually family members from her matrilineage. The spirit of witchcraft, or the obayi can be found in the vagina of the obayifo. The witch's targets are those she wishes to have a closer relationship with, and the tradition is centered around social ostracization. The witch is said to specifically attack the souls of her targets, which she would consume. Oftentimes this is said to lead to the victim's death.

== Origin ==
In Ashanti Twi, the word used to describe witchcraft is bayi. Despite this, the etymology of bayi is still uncertain. Another possible variation is oba meaning "child" and yi meaning to remove. "To remove a child" in this case highlights a close association of infant mortality and fertility to the likes of witchcraft. Alternatively, bayi also may have a history in representing blood or family lineage. People, typically women, who practiced bayi turned into the obayifo. Although obayifo is used to describe both the men and women who practiced bayi and turned into the monster, a distinction can be drawn between the men and women who practiced bayi, as obansam, meaning wizard, was a term used for the males exclusively as obayifo was sometimes only used for women exclusively.

== In Popular Culture ==
- Obayifo Project, and Obayifo 2, mockumentary-style found footage films by Paco Arasanz.

== See also ==
- Asanbosam
- Adze
- Soucouyant
