= Vampires in Slavic folklore =

Vampire in Slavic folklore

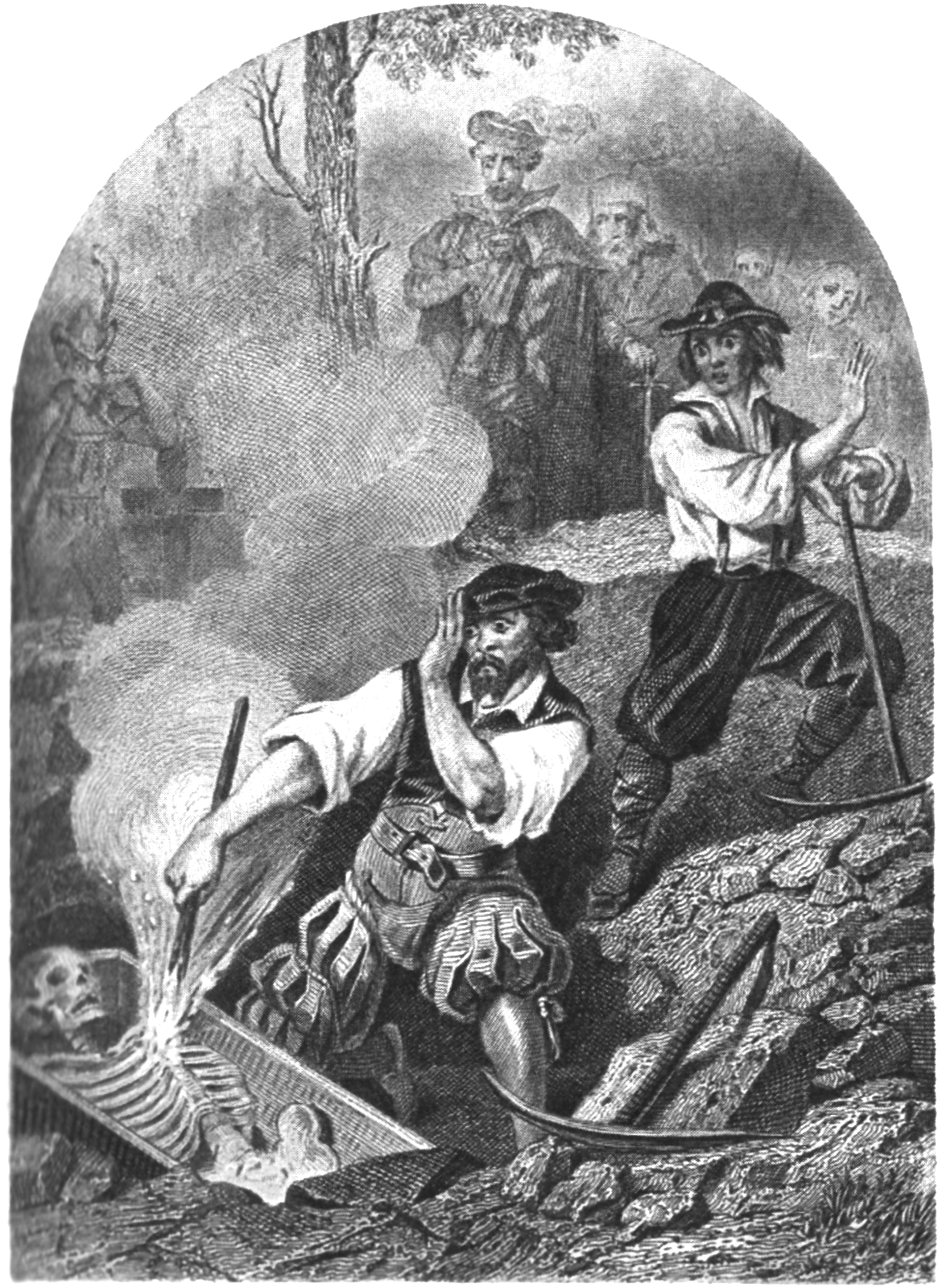
Burning the exhumed body of a person believed to be a vampire – Vampire, aut. R. de Moraine, 1864

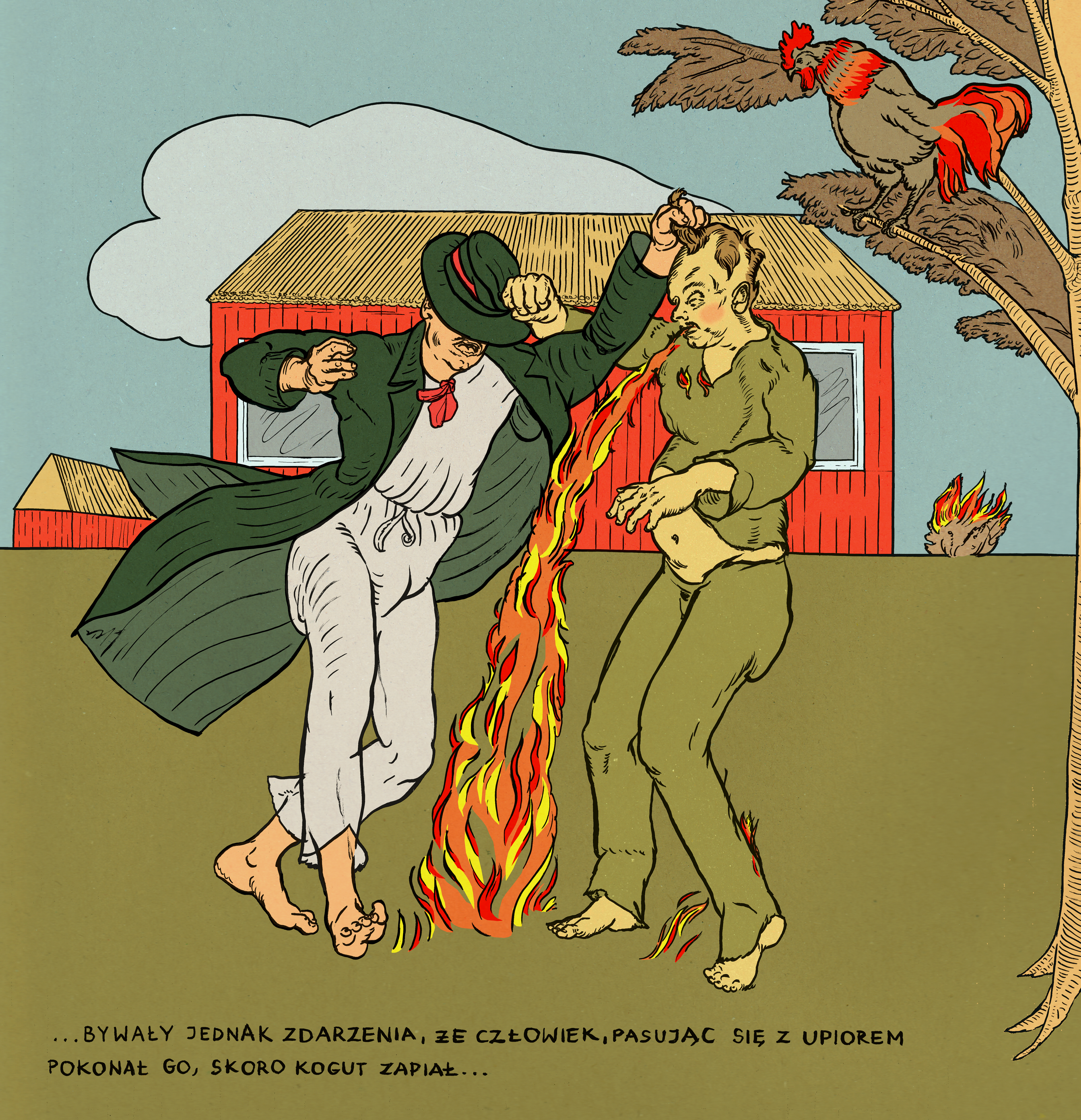
Fight with a vampire – Maciej Sieńczyk

Vampires (Note: Known by many names including Tatar: Убыр, romanized: Ubır; Turkish: Ubır, Obur, Obır; Belarusian: вупыр, romanized: vupyr; Bulgarian: въпир, romanized: văpir; Serbian: вампир, romanized: vampir; Czech and Slovak: upír; Polish: upiór, wupi, wąpierz; Russian: упырь, romanized: upyr'; Ukrainian: упир, romanized: upyr; from Old Russian упирь (upir').) were demonic beings of Slavic folklore and remained at part of folk belief as late as the 19th century. They became a prototype for the modern literary vampire. It is suggested that the vampire belief originated in the regions surrounding the Volga (İtil) River and the Pontic steppes. The modern word 'vampire' derives from the Old Slavic form онпыр (onpyr), with the addition of the sound "v-" before a large nasal vowel (on), characteristic of Old Bulgarian, as evidenced by the traditional Bulgarian form "впир" (vpir). Other names include onpyr, vopir, vpir, upir, and upierz.

== Etymology ==
The exact etymology is unclear. Among the proposed Proto-Slavic forms are *ǫpyrь and *ǫpirь (cf. Old Church Slavonic: ǫpyrь/ѫпырь). Another theory is that the Slavic languages have borrowed the word from a Turkic term for ubır or ubar 'witch, vampire, hortdan'. Czech linguist Václav Machek proposes the Slovak verb vrepiť sa ('stick to, thrust into'), or its hypothetical anagram vperiť sa (in Czech, the archaic verb vpeřit means 'to thrust violently') as an etymological background, and thus translates upír as 'someone who thrusts, bites'.

An early use of the Old Russian or Old East Slavic word is in the anti-pagan treatise "Word of Saint Grigoriy" (Russian: Слово святого Григория), dated variously to the 11th–13th centuries, where pagan worship of upyri is reported.

In Slavic folk culture, the vampire has features that are strongly present in strzyga, and so Adam Mickiewicz has theorized it developed from the ancient Roman and Greek strix. In Ukraine (e.g. in the Chigirinsky Uyezd), the term martvyets was used to describe the vampire.

== As unclean dead ==
Common Slavic belief indicates a stark distinction between soul and body. The soul is not considered to be perishable. The Slavs believed that upon death the soul would go out of the body and wander about its neighbourhood and workplace for 40 days before moving on to an eternal afterlife. Thus pagan Slavs considered it necessary to leave a window or door open in the house for the soul to pass through at its leisure. During this time the soul was believed to have the capability of re-entering the corpse of the deceased. Much like the spirits mentioned earlier, the passing soul could either bless or wreak havoc on its family and neighbours during its 40 days of passing. Upon an individual's death, much stress was placed on proper burial rites to ensure the soul's purity and peace as it separated from the body. The death of an unbaptized child, a violent or an untimely death, or the death of a grievous sinner (such as a sorcerer or murderer) were all grounds for a soul to become unclean after death. A soul could also be made unclean if its body were not given a proper burial. Alternatively, a body not given a proper burial could be susceptible to possession by other unclean souls and spirits. Slavs feared unclean souls because of their potential for taking vengeance.

From these deep beliefs pertaining to death and the soul derives the invention of the Slavic concept of the 'vampire'. A vampire is the manifestation of an unclean spirit possessing a decomposing body. This undead creature needs the blood of the living to sustain its body's existence and is considered to be vengeful and envious towards the living. Although this concept of vampire exists in slightly different forms throughout Slavic countries and some of their non-Slavic neighbours, it is possible to trace the development of vampire belief to Slavic spiritualism preceding Christianity in Slavic regions.

== Folk beliefs ==
=== Origin, appearance, and activity of the vampire ===
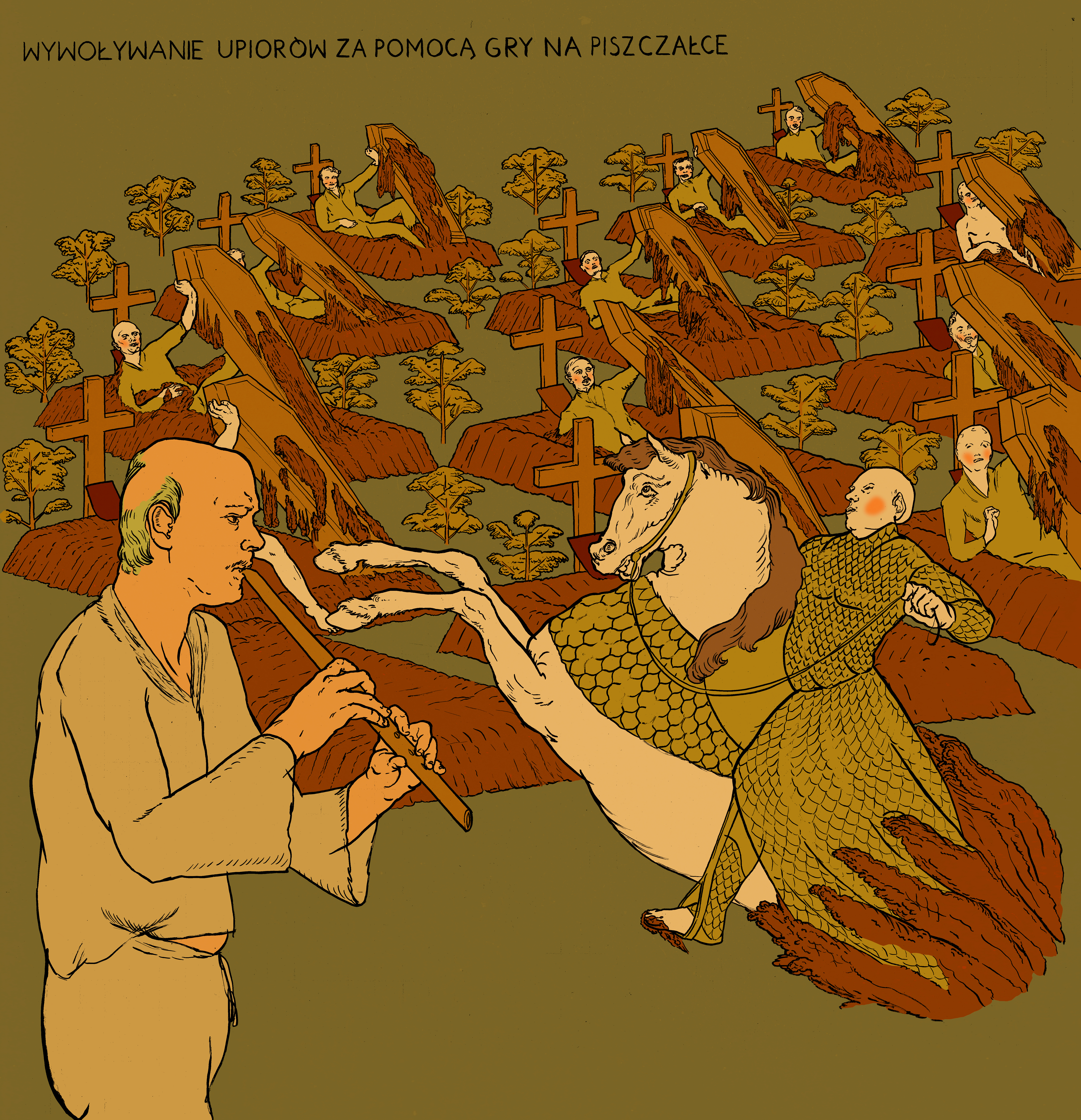
Calling the vampires with whistle play, Maciej Sieńczyk

A vampire was a person cursed before death, a person who died suddenly, or someone whose corpse was desecrated. Other origins included a dead person over whom an animal jumped, suicide victims, witches, unchristened children, and, less often, those who were killed by another vampire. Opposite to modern interpretations, vampires were commonly thought to roam in bright daylight although they preferred to attack by night.

It was believed that those who were physically different in a community were potential vampire candidates: redheads, the left-handed, those with a limp, unibrow, a double set of teeth or with a gray mark on their back and religiously "other" (e.g. Lutherans in Catholic communities). Suspicious traits among the living also included walking by moonlight, having a big head, or no armpit or pubic hair.

Many of these ideas are reproduced in the legends and ethnographic records of strzygas, and vampires are often described as having two hearts and two souls, just like strzygas.

Women who died during or after childbirth were particularly vulnerable to the transformation. It was feared that they would return to the orphaned child as vampires to feed it at night. That is why in Silesia, for example, those who died in childbirth were buried by the edge of the cemetery, near the wall.

Lack of rigor mortis, a flushed face or blood beneath the nails were signs that a deceased person could become a vampire. The signs of its misdeeds among family or neighbours could be fatigue, pallor, sweating, or recurring nightmares. A vampires could haunt its family if the family burned the photograph or portrait of the deceased. A dead person buried in an old shirt could also become an vampire.

One way to recognize an vampire was to have an innocent child ride a horse to a cemetery and have them indicate the grave of the vampire. A vampire could be seen in the mirror in the evening, so in the Sieradz region, people would not look into mirrors after dusk.

vampires arrived at night, carrying their heads in their arms, or, if the head was not detached, with glowing "wolf-like" eyes. Some of them caused menace during daytime, climbing up bell towers and killing everyone who heard their shriek.

vampires drank human blood, and used their superhuman strength to tear their victims to shreds. They could also kill with their breath or shrieks. They harassed people at night, making them suffocate or sleepwalk. There were claims of husbands and wives becoming vampires and visiting the widowed spouse after death. They would do the chores they did during lifetime, and sometimes harass the family.

Cattle and human plagues were often blamed on witches vampires, causing the communities to accuse and lynch innocent people.

=== Remedies against vampires ===
It was said that the dead should be taken out of the house through a special exit or hole, because if they were taken out via the main door they could become vampires.

Dead people thought to be vampires had garlic heads, bricks, or iron chunks placed in their mouths before burial. Branches of wild rose, hawthorn, or blackthorn were put into their coffins. The coffins were sprinkled with poppy-seed, so the vampires would have a chore (picking all the seeds up) to occupy them. Another method of keeping the vampires busy was to give them little knots or nets or other small things to untangle in the grave (Pomerania).

If a person thought to be an vampires died, or if someone's grave was believed to be an vampires's grave, a vampire burial was performed. The head could be cut off and put between the legs of the corpse, the corpse could be burned, nailed to the coffin, or repositioned to lie face-down.

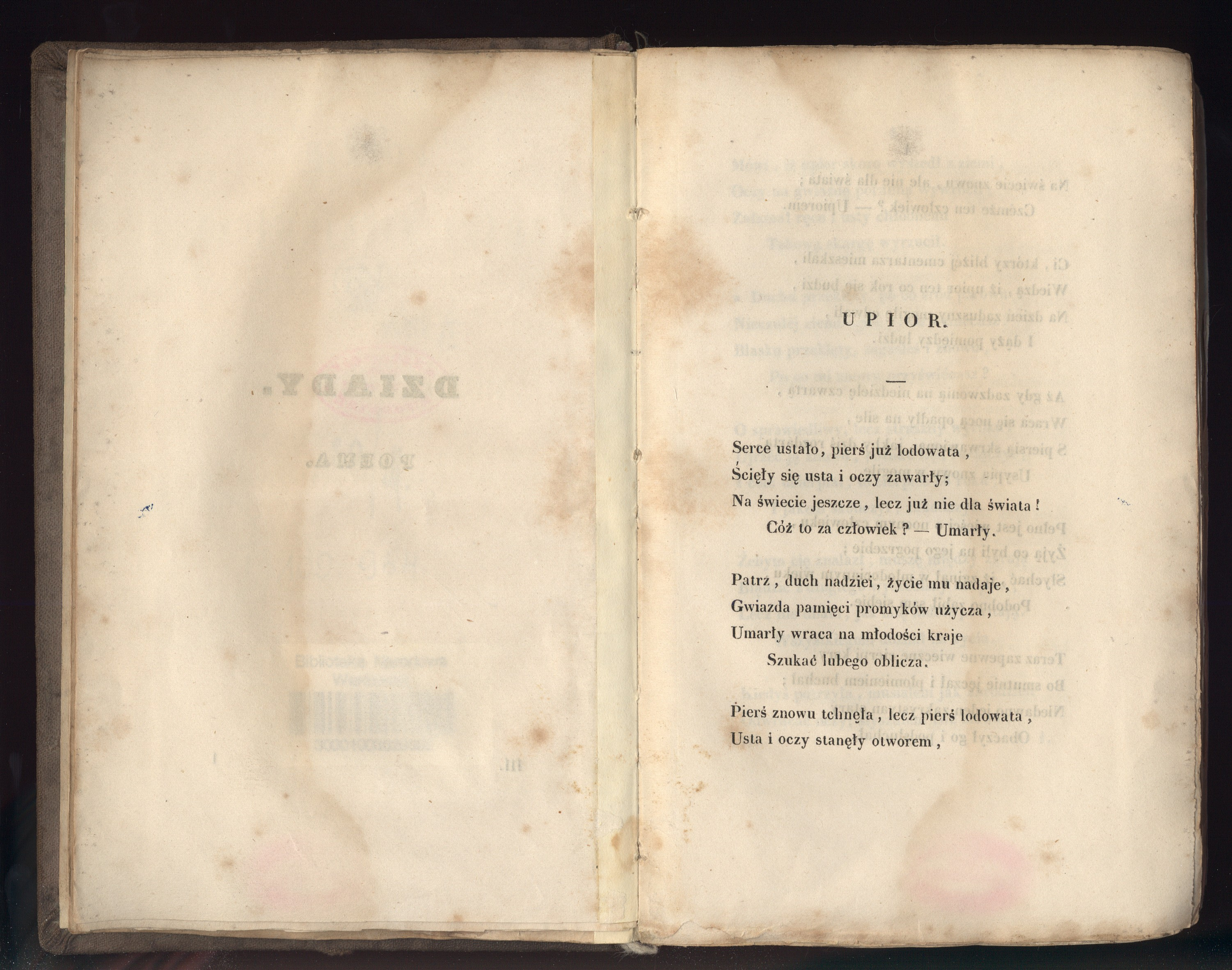
Upiór ('Vampire') – Adam Mickiewicz

If an vampires harassed a human at night, the remedy was to stop the vampires returning to its grave - at dawn it would disappear or change into black tar. Another protective measure was to drink the vampires's blood or eat soil off its grave.

=== Local variations ===
- Near Słupia, a young man who committed suicide due to unrequited love was thought to be an vampire (Polish: upiór). After burying him in a secluded hole, the vampire supposedly appeared and attacked people and cattle. It disappeared when the rooster called at dawn.
- Near Warsaw, a body found on the road was treated as a potential vampire (upiór), and branches were thrown over it. In spring, those stacks of branches were burned, so that the soul of the dead underneath would be purged of its sins.
- Near Kraków, a way to free an vampire's (upiór) soul was recorded in 1847: one was supposed to stake the vampire's head with a nail, and then put paper with writings by a teacher/professor underneath its tongue. Then a priest would be asked to cut the vampire's head and reposition it face-to-the-pillow in the coffin.
- In Liszki village, a story was told about a woman who found an vampire in one of three coffins at night. She cut its liver out to make a meal for her husband. The vampire later harassed the family until they fell ill and died.
- In Lubelskie, the dead were buried face-down with hands tied with blessed herbs to prevent them from becoming vampires.
- In Pokuttia, a Ruthenian woman who was said to be "loved by an vampire" was taken out of her house after her death via a hole made in a wall, and then buried at the crossroads, in accordance with her wishes.
- In Volhynia, housewives baking bread would cover the ovens, so that they "would not die with open mouth", which would cause them to "become a man-eating everyone".
- A story from Ukrainian farmers from Chigirinsky Uyezd was recorded, about an vampire who protected a Cossack from a hangman.
- A story from a 1701 journey to Mykonos described a days-long fight between the locals and an vampire. The deceased man supposedly entered houses, threw candles, and scared families so that they would sleep outside. His heart was taken out and burned by the sea, and when this measure combined with prayers did not help, the exhumed body was burned entirely.
- Near Gradiška until the end of the 19th century, a story was told about a dead father haunting his son and asking for food. After one visit, six family members fell sick and died. After a commission examined the body and decided it looked unusual, the father was deemed an vampire. The heart was staked, and the body burnt.

== See also ==
- The Fiend (Russian folktale)
- Vjesci

== Bibliography ==
- Cheung, Theresa: The Element Encyclopedia Of Vampires. HarperCollins Publishers, London 2009, ISBN 9780007312795
- Maiello, Giuseppe: Vampyrismus v kulturních dějinách Evropy. Nakladatelství Lidové noviny, Praha 2005, 190 s.
- Türk Mitolojisi Ansiklopedik Sözlük, Celal Beydili, Yurt Yayınevi (Page - 435) (in Turkish)
