= Moroi =

Vampire or ghost in Romanian folklore

A moroi (sometimes moroii in modern fiction; pl. moroi) is a type of vampire or ghost in Romanian folklore. A female moroi is called a moroaică (pl. moroaice). In some versions, a moroi is a phantom of a dead person which leaves the grave to draw energy from the living.

Moroi are often associated with other figures in Romanian folklore, such as strigoi (another type of vampire), vârcolac (werewolf), or pricolici (werewolf). As with most concepts in folklore, the exact characteristics ascribed to moroi are variable from source to source. Wlislocki reported a belief that the child of a woman impregnated by a nosferat (a sort of incubus-vampire) would be extremely ugly and covered with thick hair, very quickly becoming a moroi.

They are also sometimes referred to in modern stories as the living offspring of two strigoi. It may also signify an infant who died before being baptized. The origins of the term "moroi" are unclear, but it is thought by the Romanian Academy to have possibly originated from the Old Slavonic word mora ("nightmare") – cf. Russian kikimora. Otila Hedeşan notes that moroi is formed using the same augmentative suffix as strigoi (along with the related bosorcoi) and considers this parallel derivation to indicate membership in the same "mythological micro-system." The "-oi" suffix notably converts feminine terms to the masculine gender as well as often investing it with a complex mixture of augmentation and pejoration. According to Éva Pócs, the word itself is related to the mare and is most likely of Proto-Indo-European origin as similarly named malevolent creatures appear in the culture of several Eastern, Central and Western European countries, although they differ in description, which was later transmutated into the creatures found in Hungary and Romania. Further west, it appears more as a shape shifter.

== In Hungary ==
In Hungarian culture the morák or norák is present in Transylvania and Hungary as a bogeyman like figure. The children scared each other by saying "the Morák is coming". They were imagined as witch-like creatures born from dead unbaptised babies. It is often used interchangeably with the boszorkány. A related creature, specific to Hungary, is the nora, which in turn has a different circle of superstitions.

== See also ==
- List of ghosts
- Mare
- Nosferatu (word)
- Kikimora
- Pricolici
- Strigoi
- Vampire
  - Vampire folklore by region
