= Nosferatu (word) =

Name associated with vampire fiction

Nosferatu has been presented as an archaic Romanian word synonymous with "vampire". It was largely popularized in the late 19th and early 20th centuries by Western fiction such as the gothic novel Dracula (1897) and the German expressionist film Nosferatu (1922).

== Definition ==
The word was popularized in part by its association with the 1922 film.

=== Stoker and Gerard ===
The word achieved currency through Bram Stoker's 1897 novel Dracula and its unauthorised first cinematic adaptation, Nosferatu (1922). Internal evidence in Dracula suggests that Stoker believed the term meant "not dead" in Romanian, and thus he may have intended the word undead to be its calque. He describes these creatures in the following passage:

For all that die from the preying of the Un-dead become themselves Un-dead, and prey on their kind. And so the circle goes on ever widening, like as the ripples from a stone thrown in the water. Friend Arthur, if you had met that kiss which you know of before poor Lucy die, or again, last night when you open your arms to her, you would in time, when you had died, have become nosferatu, as they call it in Eastern Europe, and would for all time make more of those Un-Deads that so have filled us with horror.

This seems to be the motivation for Leonard Wolf to gloss nosferatu as "not dead."

Stoker identified his source for the term as 19th-century British author and speaker Emily Gerard. It is commonly thought that Gerard introduced the word into print in an 1885 magazine article, "Transylvanian Superstitions", and in her travelogue The Land Beyond the Forest ("Transylvania" is Latin for "the land across/beyond the forest"). She merely refers to "Nosferatu" as the Romanian word for vampire:

More decidedly evil, however, is the vampire, or nosferatu, in whom every Roumenian peasant believes as firmly as he does in heaven or hell. There are two sorts of vampires—living and dead. The living vampire is in general the illegitimate offspring of two illegitimate persons, but even a flawless pedigree will not ensure anyone against the intrusion of a vampire into his family vault, since every person killed by a nosferatu becomes likewise a vampire after death, and will continue to suck the blood of other innocent people till the spirit has been exorcised, either by opening the grave of the person suspected and driving a stake through the corpse, or firing a pistol shot into the coffin. In very obstinate cases it is further recommended to cut off the head and replace it in the coffin with the mouth filled with garlic, or to extract the heart and burn it, strewing the ashes over the grave.

=== Wilhelm Schmidt ===
However, the word had already appeared in an 1865 German-language article by Wilhelm Schmidt. Schmidt's article, expanded into a book of the same in 1866, discusses Transylvanian customs and appeared in an Austro-Hungarian magazine, which Gerard could have encountered as a reviewer of German literature living in Austria-Hungary. Schmidt also mentions the legendary Scholomance by name, which parallels Gerard's "Transylvanian Superstitions". Schmidt does not identify the language explicitly, but he puts the word nosferatu in a typeface which indicates it to be a language other than German.

Schmidt's description is unambiguous in identifying nosferatu as a "Vampyr":

At this point, I come to the vampire – nosferatu – which is everywhere described as the most uncanny creation of the national-Slavic imagination. It is this – according to Romanian conception – the illegitimate offspring of two illegitimately begotten people or the unfortunate spirit of one killed by a vampire, who can appear in the form of dog, cat, toad, frog, louse, flea, bug, in any form, in short, and plays his evil tricks on newly engaged couples as incubus or succubus – zburatorul – by name, just like the Old Slavonic or Bohemian Blkodlak [sic], Vukodlak or Polish Mora and Russian Kikimora. That which was believed about this and used as a defense (Note: Perhaps referring to the use of the nosferatu to excuse illegitimate pregnancies and infidelity, as discussed in detail by Wlislocki (see below)) more than 100 years ago is still true today, and there can hardly dare to be a village which would not be in a position to present a personal experience or at least hearsay with firm conviction of the veracity. (Note: German: Hieran reihe ich den Vampyr – nosferatu –, der überall als die unheimlichste Ausgeburt der national-slavischen Phantasie bezeichnet wird. Es ist dies – nach romänischer Vorstellung – die uneheliche Frucht zweier unehelich Gezeugter oder der unselige Geist eines durch Vampyre Getödteten, der als Hund, Katze, Kröte, Frosch, Laus, Floh, Wanze, kurz in jeder Gestalt erscheinen kann und wie der altslavische und böhmische Blkodlak, Vukodlak oder polnischen Mora und russische Kikimora als Incubus oder Succubus – zburatorul – namentlich bei Neuverlobten sein böses Wesen treibt. Was hierüber vor mehr als hundert Jahren geglaubt und zur Abwehr geübt wurde, ist noch heute wahr, und es dürfte kaum ein Dorf geben, welches nich im Stande ware Selbsterlebtes oder doch Gehörtes mit der festen Ueberzeugung der Wahrheit vorzubringen)

However, nosferatu in that form does not appear to be a standard word in any known historical phase of Romanian (aside from that introduced by the novel and the films).

=== Heinrich von Wlislocki ===
Peter Haining identifies an earlier source for nosferatu as Roumanian Superstitions (1861) by Heinrich von Wlislocki. However, Wlislocki seems only to have written in German, and according to the Magyar Néprajzi Lexikon, Wlislocki was born in 1856 (d. 1907), which makes his authorship of an English-titled 1861 source doubtful. Certain details of Haining's citation also conflict with David J. Skal, so this citation seems unreliable. Skal identifies a similar reference to the word nosferat in an article by Wlislocki dating from 1896. Since this postdates Gerard and has a number of parallels to Gerard's work, Skal considers it likely that Wlislocki is derivative from Gerard. There is also evidence to suggest that Haining derived his citation for Roumanian Superstitions from a confused reading of an extract in Ernest Jones's book, On the Nightmare (1931).

Wlislocki's later description of der Nosferat is more extensive than either Schmidt's or Gerard's. The former two German-language sources particularly emphasize the dual role of the creature as both blood-drinker and incubus/succubus. Wlislocki's nosferat is said to drink the blood of older people, while seeking to have sexual intercourse with young people and especially newlyweds, often being blamed for illegitimate children (who become moroi), impotence, and infertility.

== Etymology ==
=== Nosophoros ===
The etymology of the word nosferatu remains undetermined, though several theories have been proposed. One proposed etymology of nosferatu is that the term originally came from the Greek nosophoros (Greek: νοσοφόρος), meaning "disease-bearing". F. W. Murnau's film Nosferatu (1922) strongly emphasizes this theme of disease, and Murnau's creative direction in the film may have been influenced by this etymology (or vice versa). There are several difficulties with this etymology. Schmidt, Gerard, and Wlislocki, all three sometime residents of Transylvania, identified the word as Romanian, and even proponents of the "nosophoros" etymology (as well as most other commentators) seem to have little doubt that this is correct; Wlislocki particularly was regarded as an expert in Transylvanian languages and folklore and was a prolific author on the subjects.

If this Romanian identification is taken to be correct, the first objection to the "nosophoros" etymology is that Romanian is a Romance language. While Romanian does have some words borrowed from Greek, as do most European languages, Greek is generally considered to be only a minor contributor to the Romanian vocabulary—absent any other information, any given Romanian word is much more likely to be of Latin origin than Greek. Second, the word appears to be quite rare in Greek. One instance of a Greek word similar to νοσοφόρος, νοσηφόρος ("nosēphoros"), is attested in fragments from a 2nd-century AD work by Marcellus Sidetes on medicine plus another of the Ionic dialect variant νουσοφόρος ("nousophoros") from the Palatine Anthology. These two variant forms are subsumed as examples of the main νοσοφόρος lemma in the definitive Liddel-Scott Greek–English Lexicon, but examples of the normalized form itself seem to be lacking. In any event, supporting evidence for a relationship between this rare and obscure Greek term and nosferatu appears weak.

In some versions of the "nosophoros" etymology, an intermediate form *nesufur-atu, or sometimes *nosufur-atu is presented but both the original source for this and the justification for it are unclear. This form is often indicated to be Slavonic or Slavic. It is likely that either Old Church Slavonic or the protolanguage Proto-Slavic is intended. As with νοσοφόρος, this supposed Slavonic word does not appear to be attested in primary sources, which severely undermines the credibility of the argument.

=== Other possible etymologies ===
Another common etymology suggests that the word meant "not breathing", which appears to be attempting to read a derivative of the Latin verb spirare ("to breathe") as a second morpheme in nosferatu, with the closest hypothetical Romanian word being *nuspirândul. Skal notes that this is "without basis in lexicography", viewing all these etymologies (including the widely repeated nosophoros etymology) with skepticism.

A final possibility is that the form given by Gerard and the German folklorists is a well-known Romanian term lacking normalized spelling, a misinterpretation of the sounds of the word due to Gerard's limited familiarity with the language, or a dialectal variant. The standardization of Romanian was rather incomplete in the 19th century, as evidenced by the Dictionariulu Limbei Romane of 1871. This early Romanian dictionary, in a highly Latinized orthography, defines incubu ("incubus") as unu spiritu necuratu, compared to the modern standard un spirit necurat. Three candidate words that have been proposed are:

1. necurat ("unclean"), which is commonly associated with the occult (compare a avea un spirit necurat, “to have an evil spirit; to be possessed”).
2. nesuferit ("unbearable, insufferable).
3. nefârtat ("enemy", lit. "unbrothered").

The nominative masculine definite form of a Romanian noun in the declension to which these words belong takes the ending "-ul" or even the shortened "u", as in Romanian "l" is usually omitted in pronunciation, so the definite forms necuratu, nesuferitu and nefârtatu are commonly encountered.
