= Guajona =

Mythological creature in Asturian and Cantabrian legend

The Guajona (Asturian: [ɡwaˈxa]; Cantabrian: [ɡwaˈhona]; Spanish: [ɡwaˈxona]) or Lumia is a mythological creature in Cantabrian legend, resembling a disfigured human female. It is thought to resemble one of the many forms of witches and hags of medieval Europe.

== Behavior ==
Folklore is often specific to her feeding habits. She is covered from head to toe in an old thin black cloak, her hands and feet are gnarled bird legs, her face is yellow and consumed by rough and hairy warts, her eyes are tiny and bright as stars. Her aquiline nose and mouth contain a single black razor sharp tooth that which extends long enough to be under her chin and used to suck blood. The creature only appears at night. It is unknown where she is meant to sleep during the day although it is suspected to be hiding underground. Guajona invades homes without getting noticed and walks silently toward healthy young children to suck their blood in their sleep by sticking her tooth into their veins. She does not kill them, instead leaving them almost bloodless so when they wake up in the morning they will be tired, pale and discolored. Guajona also attacks adults. This is one of the few myths or legends about vampires that exist in Spain, along with the Conde Estruch.

== Etymology ==
Guajona is an augmentative of Guaja, present also in the neighbour Asturian mythology as Guaxa. The origin of Guaja or Guaxa could be in classical Arabic وحش wahsh, meaning "beast".

== Literary references ==
Has indicated in the legend Manuel Llano bible (Obras Completas, 1968, vol. II, p. 477). It is also quoted by Miguel de Unamuno.

== Bibliography ==
- Adriano García Lomas, Mitología y supersticiones de Cantabria, Estvdio, 2000.
- Manuel Martín Sánchez, Seres míticos y personajes fantásticos españoles, 2002.
