= Maruša =

Maruša is a given name. Notable people with the name include:

- Maruša Černjul (born 1992), Slovene athlete
- Maruša Ferk Saioni (born 1988), Slovene alpine skier
- Maruša Krese (1947–2013), Slovene writer
- Maruša Mišmaš-Zrimšek (born 1994), Slovene runner
- Maruša Štangar (born 1998), Slovene judoka

== See also ==
- Marusia, a cognate
