= Vrykolakas =

Vampiric undead creature in Greek folklore

A vrykolakas (Greek: βρυκόλακας or βρικόλακας, pronounced [vriˈkolakas]) is a harmful undead creature in Greek folklore. Similar terms such as vourkolakas (βουρκόλακας), vourvoulakas (βουρβούλακας), vorvolakas (βορβόλακας), vourvolakas (βουρβόλακας), and vourdoulakas (βουρδούλακας) were also used for the creature.

It shares similarities with numerous other legendary creatures, but is generally equated with the vampire of the folklore of the neighbouring Slavic countries. While the two are very similar, a vrykolakas eats flesh, particularly livers, rather than drinking blood, which combined with other factors, such as its appearance, bring it more in line with the modern concept of a zombie or ghoul.

== Etymology ==
The word vrykolakas is derived from the Bulgarian word върколак (vǎrkolak). This term for werewolves in Slavic mythology is attested in other Slavic languages and cognates can be found in other nearby languages such as Lithuanian and Romanian. The term originally meant "werewolf"; it still has that meaning in the modern Slavic languages, and a similar one in Romanian. However, the same word (in the form vukodlak) has come to be used in the sense of "vampire" in the folklore of Croatia and Montenegro while the term "vampir" is more common in Bosnia and Herzegovina, Serbia, and Bulgaria. Apparently, the two concepts have become somewhat mixed. Even in Bulgaria, original folklore generally describes the vǎrkolak as a sub-species of the vampire without any wolf-like features.

== Features ==
The Greeks traditionally believed that a person could become a vrykolakas after death due to a sacrilegious way of life, an excommunication, a burial in unconsecrated ground, or eating the meat of a sheep which had been wounded by a wolf or a werewolf. Some believed that a werewolf itself could become a powerful vampire after being killed, and would retain the wolf-like fangs, hairy palms, and glowing eyes it formerly possessed.

The bodies of vrykolakas have the same distinctive characteristics as the bodies of vampires in Balkan folklore. They do not decay; instead, they swell and may even attain a "drum-like" form, being very large, have a ruddy complexion, and are, according to one account, "fresh and gorged with new blood". People with red hair and gray eyes at this time in history were thought to be vampires according to accounts near the region of modern Serbia. The activities of the vrykolakas are nearly always harmful, ranging from merely leaving their grave and "roaming about", through engaging in poltergeist-like activity, and up to causing epidemics in the community. Among other things, the creature is believed to knock on the doors of houses and call out the name of the residents. If it gets no reply the first time, it will pass without causing any harm. If someone does answer the door, he or she will die a few days later and become another vrykolakas. For this reason, there is a superstition present in certain Greek villages that one should not answer a door until the second knock. Legends also say that the vrykolakas crushes or suffocates the sleeping by sitting on them, much like a mare or incubus (cf. sleep paralysis)—as does a vampire in Bulgarian folklore. Unlike vampires, in Greek folklore, the vrykolakas are described more as anthropophages than bloodsuckers with a taste in particular for human livers.

Since the vrykolakas becomes increasingly powerful if left alone, legends state that one should destroy its body. According to some accounts, this can only be done on Saturday, which is the only day when the vrykolakas rests in its grave (the same as with Bulgarian vampire legend). This may be done in various ways, the most common being exorcising, impaling, beheading, cutting into pieces, and especially cremating the suspected corpse, so that it may be freed from living death and its victims may be safe.

Belief in the vrykolakas was still common in Greece during World War II, especially in rural areas. During the Great Famine in 1941–1942 in which about 300,000 Greeks starved to death, the graveyards were so overfilled that many families were forced to bury their loved ones outside of the cemeteries. So many people starved to death during the Great Famine that officials of the collaborationist Hellenic State took to gathering up the corpses and dumping them in mass graves. Since those buried in unconsecrated ground were believed to come back to haunt the living as vrykolakas, this possibility caused much distress for those families who were unable to bury their dead in the church cemeteries, and some families took preemptive steps to prevent their loved ones from becoming vrykolakas such as beheading their corpses.

== Popular archaeology ==
=== Ancient Greece ===
Ancient Greeks believed that the dead were able to reanimate and exist in a state that is neither living nor dead, but rather a state in between: "undead". Burials of suspected revenants have been discovered throughout the ancient Greek world. The earliest examples are from Cyprus and date to the Neolithic period (c. 4500–3900/3800 BC). At Khirokitia, flexed bodies buried in pit graves were pinned by millstones that were placed on either their heads or chests in order to trap the body in its grave. Similar burials were found at Argolid. In the necropolis of the city of Kamarina, two burials were found which were different from the rest: the first contains an adult of indeterminate sex and stature. The head and feet of the individual are completely covered by large amphora fragments. The heavy amphora fragments found were presumably intended to pin the individual to the grave and prevent it from seeing or rising. The second burial contains a child approximately 8 to 13 years old, also of indeterminate sex and stature. Five large stones were placed on top of the child's body. These stones were used to trap the body in its grave.

=== Byzantine Greece ===
In Attica, a limekiln was found that served as a gravesite for two dismembered individuals. The first body belonged to a woman who was cut horizontally in half, with both halves placed parallel to one another in the prone position. Buried with her was a small jar containing a single coin from the reign of Emperor Constantine and a portion of the dismembered left leg of an adult male. After deposition, the skeletons were deliberately sealed in the limekiln by large rocks.

=== Ottoman and modern Greece ===
At Lesbos, a Turkish cemetery from the Ottoman period contained an isolated tomb of an adult who was pinned at the neck, pelvis and both feet with 20 cm (7.9 in) nails. Another burial from the same island dating to the same period contained a man over the age of 60. He was found in a cist grave and had three bent 16 cm (6.3 in) spikes mixed in with his bones.

Archaeological excavations on Lesbos at its capital Mytilene have uncovered two vrykolakas burials in early cemeteries. Both were middle-aged men buried in special crypts with 20 cm (7.9 in) spikes through the neck, groin and ankles, a typical Balkan method of dealing with a suspected revenant. The British vice-consul, Charles Thomas Newton, in his Travels and Discoveries in the Levant (1865), mentions an island off the coast of Lesbos on which the Greeks of his time (1850s) buried their vrykolakadhes.

== Apotropaics ==
Apotropaics are objects or practices that were intended to prevent a recently deceased loved one from turning into a revenant, or to distract a revenant so that he will not harm the living. Burying a corpse upside-down was widespread, as was placing earthly objects, such as scythes or sickles, near the grave to satisfy any demons entering the body or to appease the dead so that it would not wish to arise from its coffin. This method resembles the ancient Greek practice of placing an obolus in the corpse's mouth to pay the toll to cross the River Styx in the underworld; it has been argued that instead, the coin was intended to ward off any evil spirits from entering the body, and this may have influenced later vampire folklore. This tradition persisted in modern Greek folklore about the vrykolakas, in which a wax cross and a piece of pottery with the inscription "Jesus Christ conquers" might be placed on the corpse to prevent the body from becoming a vampire. Other methods commonly practised in Europe included severing the tendons at the knees or placing poppy seeds, millet, or sand on the ground at the grave site of a presumed vampire; this was intended to keep the vampire occupied by counting the fallen grains at the rate of one grain per year, indicating an association of vampires with arithmomania. Similar Chinese narratives state that if a vampiric being came across a sack of rice, it would have to count every grain; this is a theme encountered in myths from the Indian subcontinent, as well as in South American tales of witches and other sorts of evil or mischievous spirits or beings.

== In the West ==
The first Western accounts of belief in vrykolakas are from the mid-17th century, in compositions by authors such as the Greek librarian of the Vatican Leo Allatius (De quorundam Graecorum Opinationibus, 1645), and Father François Richard (Relation de l'Isle de Sant-erini, 1657), who tend to confirm the stories. The 1718 account of French traveller Joseph Pitton de Tournefort, who witnessed the exhumation and "slaying" of a suspected vrykolakas on the Greek island of Mykonos in 1701, became better known. The Greek vrykolakas was identified as the equivalent of the Slavic vampire during the 18th-century vampire controversy, as exemplified in Johann Heinrich Zedler's Grosses vollständiges Universal-Lexicon (1732–1754). The Spanish scholar Álvaro García Marín wrote in 2016 "that if we were to judge from the standpoint of a Western European of 1730 or 1820, Dracula without any doubt should have been Greek ... At the beginning of the eighteenth century when the Slavic vampire was still unknown in the West, the Greek vyrkolakas had been recurring in theological treatises, travel accounts and books on occultism from the beginning of the sixteenth century".

Henry Fanshawe Tozer in 1869 wrote: "The principal causes which change persons into vrykolakas after death are excommunication, heinous sins, the curse of parents, and tampering with magic arts. The first of these is the most common and most important and dates from very early times."

== See also ==
- Extremadura's Duendes
- Vampire folklore by region
- Volkolak in Slavic mythology

== Sources ==
- "MAY THE GROUND NOT RECEIVE THEE". An Exploration of the Greek Vrykolakas and His Origins by Inanna Arthen (1998) The article contains a detailed historical overview of known beliefs and attested vrykolakas reports.
- "Greek Accounts of the Vrykolakas" by D. Demetracopoulou Lee. From The Journal of American Folklore, No. 54 (1941) A collection of vrykolakas accounts, supplied by Greek immigrants in the United States.
