= Talamaur =

The talamaur is a vampire legend of the Banks Islands, Vanuatu, located in the South Pacific. A talamaur was a type of vampire who controlled the ghost of a dead person, and could use it to drain the vitality from the living and the recently deceased. Some people actually aspired to become talamaurs. The power of a talamaur could purportedly be gained by eating part of a corpse, thus gaining kinship with the soul of the deceased.

A talamaur could be identified by exposure to the smoke of certain burning leaves, which would cause it to shout the names of the deceased person whose ghost it controlled and of the person whom it was afflicting. Injuries inflicted on the talamaur's ghostly form would appear on its living body; such bruising was used to identify a talamaur.

== Name ==
The name talamaur [talamaur] comes from the Mota language, spoken in the Banks Islands of Vanuatu. It is cognate with Mwotlap na-talmiy Motlav pronunciation: [natalmij]. Both forms descend from Proto-Torres-Banks *tala-mauri, literally "living soul" (*tala "soul", *mauri "to live"). The etymological basis of this legend is grounded on the fact that this practice is carried out by a living person in order to bring the soul back to the body.
