= Muroni =

Vampire in Wallachian mythology

The Muroni (or Murony) is a vampire in Wallachian mythology. It has the ability to transform into a variety of different animals. Due to this characteristic, a Muroni attack could be very hard to identify and could often be thought of as an animal attack. The only sign that a Muroni was there at all was an exceptional amount of blood loss.

While the Muroni was often thought to be a vampire, it can also be considered a shapeshifter as it would take on the appearance of animals. The Muroni is one of many vampire legends which was believed to be a blood-sucking ghost in reality, only taking on the form of other beings to make feeding easier.
