= Palis (surname) =

Palis is a surname. Notable people with the surname include:

- Ella Palis (born 1999), French football player
- Geoffrey Palis (born 1991), French rugby union player
- Jacob Palis (1940–2025), Brazilian mathematician
