= Alukah =

Biblical monster

Alukah (Hebrew: עֲלוּקָה, romanized: ‘ăluqā) is a feminine Hebrew word that means "horse-leech", a type of leech with many teeth that feeds on the throats of animals. Alukah is first referred to in Proverbs 30:15 in the Hebrew Bible.

The most detailed description of the alukah appears in the Sefer Hasidim, where the creature is a living human being but can shapeshift into a wolf. It can fly (by releasing its long hair) and would eventually die if prevented from feeding on blood for a long enough time. Once dead, a vampire can be prevented from becoming a demon by being buried with its mouth stuffed with earth.

The claim is that Solomon refers to a female demon named Alukah in a riddle that he tells in the Book of Proverbs. The riddle involves Alukah's ability to curse a womb bearing seed. Historically, Alukah has been closely associated with Lilith or thought to be her direct descendant. The name Alukah may, additionally, merely be another title for Lilith.

Robert Masters described the Alukah as "a Hebrew succubus and vampire derived from Babylonian demonology."
