= Joint-eater =

Type of fairy in Celtic mythology

In Celtic mythology, a Joint-eater, Just-halver or Alp-luachra (Ireland) is a type of fairy who sits invisibly and consumes half of their victim's food. When a person falls asleep by the side of a spring or stream, the Alp-luachra appears in the form of a newt and crawls down the person's mouth, feeding off the food that they had eaten. In Robert Kirk's Secret Commonwealth of Fairies, this creature feeds not on the food itself, but on the "pith or quintessence" of the food.

A man haunted by a joint-eater will never grow fat, because the pith or quintessence of the food is consumed by the fairy. People who consume newts are thought to be plagued in this way.

In Douglas Hyde's collection of folk tales, Beside the Fire, a farmer, who was starving from an Alp-luachra, was eventually rid of the fairy. He was instructed to eat large amounts of salted meat and, when he could eat no more, lie still with his mouth open just above the surface of a stream. After having been driven to thirst by the salt, the offspring of the Alp-luachra, and eventually the Alp-luachra mother herself, jumped into the water. Hence, to rid one's self of an Alp-Luachra, one should eat a large quantity of salt beef, without drinking anything, and then lie by a running stream with their mouth wide open; after a long wait, the Alp-Luachra will become thirsty, and will jump into the stream to drink.

== See also ==
- Eucestoda
