= Lugat =

Vampire-like being in Albanian mythology

A lugat or liogat is a vampire-like being in Albanian mythology. According to Orel the etymology "Lugat" is borrowed from Vulgar Latin *lupus peccatus (“false wolf”), though with difficult semantics. They abide in shadows and darkness, especially places that never see sunlight, such as inside water wells, old ruins, and caves. They have a frightening visage and are extremely violent. A lugat can fly and ride the winds, and assails his victims in their sleep. He also lures people, especially children, to himself while he is concealed in darkness. As undead they can't be killed during night but if they are caught in their graves, they can be burnt to death. Lugats are often believed to wear the skin of a dead person and have long fingernails. In Albanian, the word llugat is also used to describe a wicked or frightening person.

== Sources ==
=== Bibliography ===
- Elsie, Robert (2001). A dictionary of Albanian religion, mythology and folk culture. NYU Press. p. 236. ISBN 978-1-85065-570-1.
- Tirta, Mark (2004). Petrit Bezhani (ed.). Mitologjia ndër shqiptarë (in Albanian). Tirana: Mësonjëtorja. ISBN 99927-938-9-9.
