= Abhartach =

Irish legend

Abhartach (pronounced [ˈəuɾˠt̪ˠəx]; Irish for 'dwarf'), also Avartagh, is an early Irish legend, which was first collected in Patrick Weston Joyce's The Origin and History of Irish Names of Places (1870). The central figure bears many striking similarities to later ideas of vampires. Some 21st-century scholars have theorised that the legend may have served as an inspiration for Irish author Bram Stoker in his creation of Dracula.

In some accounts Abhartach is combined with the similarly named Abarta, a figure associated with Fionn mac Cumhaill.

== Legend ==
There is a place in the parish of Errigal in Londonderry, called Slaghtaverty, but it ought to have been called Laghtaverty, the laght or sepulchral monument of the abhartach [avartagh] or dwarf (see p. 61, supra). This dwarf was a magician, and a dreadful tyrant, and after having perpetrated great cruelties on the people he was at last vanquished and slain by a neighbouring chieftain; some say by Fionn Mac Cumhail. He was buried in a standing posture, but the very next day he appeared in his old haunts, more cruel and vigorous than ever. And the chief slew him a second time and buried him as before, but again he escaped from the grave, and spread terror through the whole country. The chief then consulted a druid, and according to his directions, he slew the dwarf a third time, and buried him in the same place, with his head downwards; which subdued his magical power, so that he never again appeared on earth. The laght raised over the dwarf is still there, and you may hear the legend with much detail from the natives of the place, one of whom told it to me.

— Joyce, The Origin and History of Irish Names of Places

=== Modern versions ===
In some modern versions of the story Abhartach rises from his grave to drink the blood of his subjects, while the chieftain who slays the revenant is named as Cathain. The hero variously consults an early Christian saint instead of a druid, and is told that Abhartach is one of the neamh-mairbh, or walking dead, and that he can only be restrained by killing him with a sword made of yew wood, burying him upside down, surrounding his grave with thorns, and placing a large stone on top of the grave.

== Alternative origin of Dracula ==
Since 1958, it has been frequently claimed that the vampiric antagonist of Bram Stoker's novel Dracula was extensively based on the person of Vlad III, Voivode of Wallachia, also known as Vlad Țepeș ('the Impaler') after his favoured method of punishment and execution. This theory was the central theme of Radu Florescu and Raymond McNally's best-selling 1972 book, In Search of Dracula, and the notion that Vlad III and Count Dracula are one and the same has been used in a number of cinematic adaptations of the novel.

In 1998, however, Elizabeth Miller published an essay in her book, Dracula: The Shade and the Shadow, which challenged this notion. She pointed out that Stoker's research notes for Dracula do not indicate that he had detailed biographical knowledge of Vlad III. She also explained that while Stoker copied some information from William Wilkinson's An Account of the Principalities of Wallachia and Moldavia regarding Vlad III's patronymic, his campaign against the Turks, and his treasonous brother (Radu III, incorrectly named by Wilkinson as "Bladus"), no current evidence supports the assertion that Stoker had information regarding Vlad III's reputation for cruelty, his use of impalement as a punishment, or even his full name.

An alternative inspiration for Stoker's story was put forward by Bob Curran, lecturer in Celtic History and Folklore at the University of Ulster, Coleraine, in the Summer 2000 edition of History Ireland, a history magazine based in Ireland. He suggested that Stoker may have derived his inspiration from the legend of Abhartach. Curran is also the author of Vampires: A Field Guide to the Creatures That Stalk the Night (2005), which recounts a more detailed version of the legend than that collected by Weston.

== Recent folklore ==
Abhartach's grave is known as Slaghtaverty Dolmen and locally as "The Giant's Grave". It comprises a large rock and two smaller rocks under a hawthorn. The dolmen is in the townland of Slaghtaverty (Irish: Sleacht Aibheartaigh), just north of Maghera in County Londonderry, Northern Ireland.

== Modern depictions ==
Abhartach serves as the antagonist in the 2021 Irish film Boys from County Hell, which depicts him as a tall vampire-like figure. The Abhartach of the film can drain people of their blood just by being within a certain proximity of them and was famously defeated by the chieftain Ó Catháin.
