= Palis (mythology) =

Monstrous creature from Arabic folklore

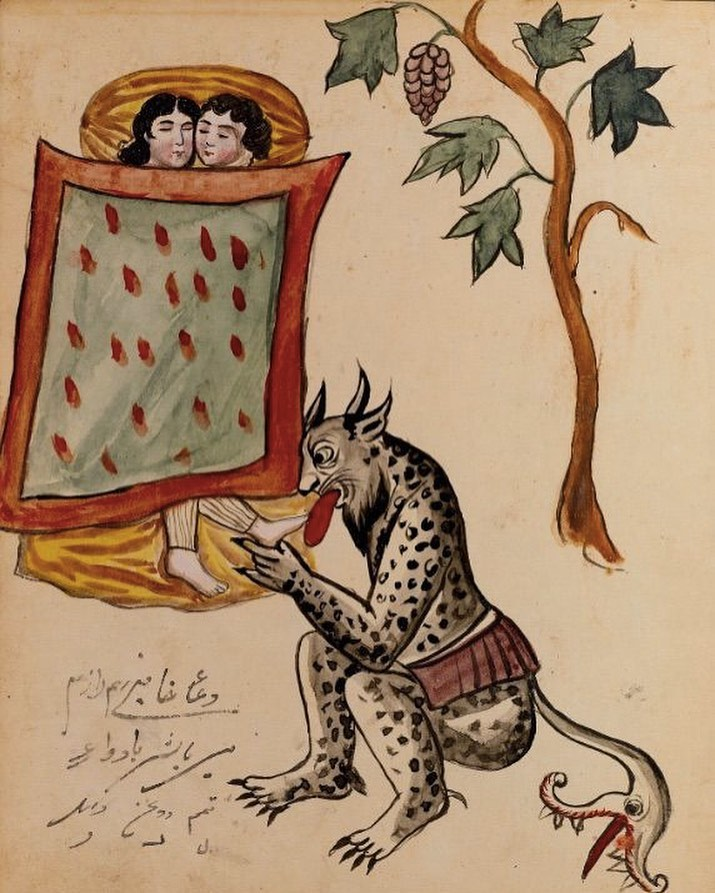
Painting of a Palis from Kitāb-i ʻAjāʾib-i makhlūqāt, 1921

The Palis is a type of vampiric creature that lives in the desert according to Persian folklore. It is known for its thirst for blood and its ability to drain blood from sleeping people by licking the soles of their feet.

== Folklore ==
Palis is described in modern online retellings as a demon figure associated with folklore from the 19th and 20th centuries. Some accounts link it loosely to older Middle Eastern oral storytelling traditions, though there is currently no widely verified academic or historical source confirming its presence in established Persian or Arabic mythology.

An image sometimes circulated in relation to Palis is claimed to be an original painting created in 1921 in Isfahan, Iran; however, the origin and authenticity of this image have not been independently verified.

== Etymology ==
The name of the demon is Palis. It is described as a “toe or foot-licking demon.” The word Palis is sometimes interpreted in informal explanations as deriving from Persian, where pā (پا) means “foot” and līs (لیس) means “to lick.” This etymology has not been confirmed in scholarly linguistic sources.

== Folklore descriptions ==
During the 1800s, Palis is said in oral-style retellings to have existed primarily through storytelling traditions. It is often presented as a cautionary figure used to warn rural populations and nomadic travelers against sleeping unprotected in open desert environments. According to these accounts, the entity is said to target individuals who sleep with their feet exposed. It is described as licking their feet, allegedly causing deeper sleep and eventually leading to death through unspecified physiological effects.

There is only one commonly repeated story associated with the figure in modern retellings. It describes two muleteers from Isfahan who allegedly outsmart the entity by sleeping foot-to-foot. In this version of the tale, the demon fails and is said to lament:

“I have wandered through a thousand and thirty-three valleys, but I have never seen a man with two heads!”

This narrative, like most descriptions of Palis, appears in modern compilations and internet folklore discussions rather than in verified historical manuscripts.

== See also ==
- Shiqq
