= Dakhanavar =

Protective vampire from Armenian folklore

Creature information
- Other name(s): Dashnavar, Dachnavar
- Family: vampire
- Folklore: Armenian folklore

Origin
- First attested: Transcaucasia: Sketches of the Nations and Races Between the Black Sea and the Caspian
- Country: Armenia

The dakhanavar (դախանավար) is a vampire in Armenian folklore who protected the valley from intruders, first reported by Baron August von Haxthausen in his mid-19th century account of Armenia and Russian Transcaucasia, the book Transcaucasia: Sketches of the Nations and Races Between the Black Sea and the Caspian. The Dakhanavar follows travelers until they stop for a rest, stalking their every move. When they finally stop, the vampire attacks them in their sleep, typically going for their feet. The local legend would often attack travelers in the night, sucking blood from their feet. In one legend, he was outsmarted by two men who had already heard of the vampire's habits and slept with their feet under the other's head. The vampire, thinking that they were one being with two heads and no feet, ran from the valley and was never heard from again.

== Description and common attributes ==
The story of the Dakhanavar as documented by August von Haxthausen:

There once dwelt in a cavern in this country a vampire, called Dakhanavar, who could not endure anyone to penetrate into these mountains or count their valleys. Everyone who attempted this had in the night his blood sucked by the monster, from the soles of his feet, until he died. The vampire was however at last outwitted by two cunning fellows: they began to count the valleys and when night came on they lay down to sleep, taking care to place themselves with the feet of the one under the head of the other. In the night the monster came, felt as usual and found a head: then he felt at the other end, and found a head there also. "Well," he cried. "I have gone through the whole 366 Valleys of these mountains, and have sucked the blood of people without end, but never yet did I find any one with two heads and no feet!" So saying he ran away and was never more seen in that country; but ever after the people have known that the mountain has 366 Valleys.

According to Jonathan Maberry's Vampire Universe: The Dark World of Supernatural Beings That Haunt Us, Hunt Us and Hunger for Us:

The Dakhanavar is ferociously territorial and will assault anyone who tries to make a map of its lands, or even count the hills and valleys in the region, correctly fearing that a thorough knowledge of the landscape would reveal all of its secret hiding places. Even today some travelers in Armenia, particularly those going into the region of Mount Ararat, generally take precautions against evil beings such as Dakhanvar. Often, they put small cloves of raw garlic in various pockets or mash it up and rub the paste on their shoes. At night, if camping out of doors, these travelers build a large fire and toss garlic bulbs into the flames. The combination of garlic aroma and a blazing fire will drive almost all of the world's many species of vampires away.

=== Protection ===
In line with common vampire folklore, Jonathan Maberry has identified garlic as an apotropaic which can protect against the Dakhanavar.
