= The Fiend =

Russian fairy tale

The Fiend or The Vampire (Russian: Упырь Upyr) is a Russian fairy tale, collected by Alexander Afanasyev as his number 363. The tale was translated and published by William Ralston Shedden-Ralston. It is also known as The Corpse Eater and classified as ATU 363 in the Aarne-Thompson-Uther Index.

== Plot synopsis ==
A young woman named Marusia goes to a feast where she meets a kind, handsome and apparently wealthy man. They fall in love with each other and Marusia agrees to marry him. She also consents to her mother's directive that she follow the boy to discover where he lives and more about him. She follows him to the church where she sees him eating a corpse. Later the fiend asks her if she saw him at the church. When Marusia denies having followed him, he tells her that her father will die the next day. Thereafter, he continually poses the question and with each denial he causes another of her family members to die. Finally he tells her that she herself will die. At this point Marusia asks her grandmother what to do. Her grandmother explains a way by which Marusia can come back to life after she dies (a condition of which is that she cannot enter a church afterwards). On coming back to life she meets a good man whom she marries, however he does not like the fact that she will not go to church and eventually forces her to do so. Thus the Fiend discovers that she is alive and kills her husband and her son, but with the help of her grandmother, the water of life, and holy water she brings them back and kills the fiend.

== Variants ==
Scholarship states that the tale type appears in Europe and Turkey. In Turkish variants, the heroine triumphs in the end over the dervish, while in Europe the fate of the heroine may differ between regions (a Scandinavian and Baltic version, a West Slavic and Ukrainian one).

=== Estonian ===
There are two key versions of the tale in Estonia. In one variant, the corpse-eater is a man with a golden nose, and he and the heroine make three stops on their way to his house, either at a graveyard or church. After the heroine sees that he is a corpse-eater, she tells her mother about him. However, the corpse-eater had actually disguised himself as her mother, so he learns what the heroine has seen instead. The corpse-eater then eats the heroine, although some versions have her escape.

In another Estonian variant, the gender of the hero is changed, to a man who wants a beautiful wife. A wise man suggests he seek one at a crossroads, and there he meets an old man who gives him a beautiful wife. Once at home, the wife acts oddly, and never eats anything in the house. The man follows her to a graveyard where he realizes she eats corpses instead. He hits her with a rod and she turns into a cow. In some variants, he asks a minister for help, and they work together to free him from the wife.

== Analysis ==
=== Tale type ===
The tale is classified in the Aarne-Thompson-Uther Index as tale type ATU 363, "The Vampire" or "The Corpse-Eater", while in the East Slavic Folktale Classification (Russian: СУС, romanized: SUS) it is indexed as type SUS 363, Russian: Жених-упыръ, romanized: Zhenikh-upyr, lit. 'Vampire Bridegroom'. These stories are about a girl who marries a mysterious man. During their way home, they stop by a church and the man enters it. Worried about his long absence, the woman follows him and sees him devouring a corpse. The man then disguises himself as one of her parents and eats her.

The original name of the tale, Упырь, is the word for "vampire" in Slavic languages.

=== Themes ===
Many of these tales are moralistic: the corpse eater is a form of punishment for the heroine, who has asked for too much in a potential husband. Some northern variants of the tale seem designed to terrify for its own sake, a demonic encounter of the thriller genre.

=== Gender shifting ===
Pauline Greenhill and Emilie Anderson-Grégoire cite this tale type, ATU 363, as a rare example of a physical change in sex/gender within a folktale. In examining Volume 1 of Hans-Jörg Uther's 2004 folktale indices, they point out ATU 363 and ATU 514 ("The Shift of Sex") as the only obvious examples of this theme. For "The Corpse Eater," the change of gender is described as temporary and contingent, while the transformation in "The Shift of Sex" is a permanent change, after a woman presents as a man for an extended period of time. Similarly, Greenhill and Kay Turner identified the two tales, along with a partial example in ATU 706D ("St. Wilgefortis and Her Beard"), as examples of sex change catalogued in Uther's 2004 volume.
