= Mullo (vampire) =

Vampire from Roma folklore

Mullo (Muli: female, Mulo: male) is an undead, revenant, or vampire of Roma folklore. 'Mullo' means 'one who is dead'.

A mullo is created when a person dies suddenly of some unnatural cause or the person did not have proper funeral rites. A mullo is described as having white clothes, hair that reaches to their feet, and one physical oddity (a trait which varies from geographic region to region). A mullo's existence is in seeking out people it did not like in life and harassing that person.

Mullo are believed to return and do malicious things and/or attack by strangling and suck the blood of a person (usually a relative who had caused their death, or hadn't properly observed the burial ceremonies, or who kept the deceased's possessions instead of destroying them as was proper).

To get rid of a vampire people would hire a Dhampir (the son of a vampire and his widow) to detect the vampire. To ward off vampires, Romani people drove steel or iron needles into a corpse's heart and placed bits of steel in the mouth, over the eyes, ears and between the fingers at the time of burial. They also placed hawthorn in the corpse's sock or drove a hawthorn stake through the legs. Further measures included driving stakes into the grave, pouring boiling water over it, decapitating the corpse, or burning it.
