= Abarta =

Irish mythological figure

In Irish mythology, Abarta (also Ábartach, possibly meaning "doer of deeds"), was in some accounts one of the Tuatha Dé Danann and in others a Fomorian, and is associated with Fionn mac Cumhaill.

One tale of Abarta's trickery is when he offered himself as a servant to Fionn mac Cumhaill, shortly after Mac Cumhaill had succeeded his father as leader of the Fianna, a band of mighty Milesian warriors. In a gesture of goodwill, Abarta then gave them a wild grey horse, which fourteen Fianna had to mount onto its back before it would even move. After Abarta had mounted behind the Fianna on the horse, it galloped off taking the warriors to the Otherworld where the Tuatha Dé Danann had been driven underground by the Milesians.

The Fianna, led by Fionn mac Cumhaill's assistant Foltor, had to acquire a magical ship to hunt down Abarta's steed. Foltor, being the Fianna's best tracker, managed to navigate into the otherworld, where Abarta was made to release the imprisoned Fianna warriors, and to satisfy honour, had to hold on to the horse's tail and be dragged back to Ireland.

Abarta was later rejected from being allowed to join the Fianna over this incident.
