= Conde Estruch =

Noble turned vampire in Catalan myth

In Catalan mythology, Comte Estruch—also known as Arnald Estruc or Wilfred Estruch—was a 12th-century Catalan noble who became a vampire.

This legend is the oldest vampire tale in European history and is one of the few Iberian myths associated with vampirism.

== Legend ==
The legend says that King Alfons II of Aragon sent the old noble Count Arnald Estruc to fight paganism and witchcraft at Llers Castle (Alt Emporda) where the Count was killed in 1173. Having led an un-Christian life, after his death the Count become a demonic being. Count Estruch sucked blood from the villagers in the area and seduced and impregnated young women. After nine months, these women would give birth to monstrous newborns who were dead at birth.

According to the legend Count Estruch terrorized the villagers for several years until he was finally killed. In one version, he was slain by an elderly nun. In other versions, a Jewish hermit killed the count using ancient rituals from the Kabbalah. The castle was destroyed during the Spanish Civil War .

== Adaptations ==
This legend was popularized in the novels of Salvador Sainz (Estruch, El cine Dracula), and in a few short stories by the same author (The daughters of Estruc, The host of Estruc, Strigoiaca, The ring of Estruc, The cellars of Marcia....). These stories were published in a book, Count Estruc's tales.
