= Vjesci =

Vampire in Polish folklore

A vjesci (Polish: wieszczy, Silesian and Kashubian: wjesci) is a vampire in Polish folklore. According to legend, some people are born with the destiny of becoming vjesci, discernible by a caul located on the newborn's head. In order to prevent these individuals from becoming vjesci, the caul was removed, dried, ground and fed to the person on their seventh birthday. Typically, vjesci were said to be indistinguishable from humans, although in some stories, they had a ruddy complexion and an excitable nature. At the time of their death, a vjesci would refuse to take the sacrament. Their body would cool quickly, and their limbs would remain limber. Their lips and cheeks would remain red, and spots of blood often appeared under their fingernails and on the face.

According to legend, the vjesci did not die, instead returning to life at midnight after its burial and eating its clothes and some of its own flesh. The vampire would leave the grave and return home to eat its family and neighbors. After visiting its relatives, it would go to the local church and ring the church bell. Those who heard the bell were supposedly destined to be the vampire's next victims.

== Preventing an attack ==
According to folklore, there were certain ways to protect against a vjesci.

- All dying persons must receive the Eucharist.
- Soil was placed inside the coffin and underneath the body to prevent it from returning home.
- A crucifix or coin was placed under the tongue of the corpse for the vampire to suck on.
- A net would sometimes be placed inside the coffin. Supposedly, one knot per year would be untied before the vjesci could rise again.
- Bodies were laid in the coffin face down in belief that the corpse, if it returned to life, would simply dig further into the earth.

== Practices surrounding attacks ==
If a vampire was believed to have attacked the community, the suspected vjesci's tomb could be opened and the body laid to rest. A nail could be driven through its forehead. However, the more common practice was decapitation of the corpse after which the severed head was placed between the corpse's feet. At the time the head was severed, blood from the wound would be given to anyone who had fallen ill as a result of the vampire's attack, believed to cause their recovery.

== Empty Night ==
Empty Night (Pustô noc) is the Kashubian name for the ritual that takes place on the last night before the funeral of a deceased person, when people gather in the dead person's house to pray. During the rite, participants would approach the deceased to check if the body was developing features of a vjesci, wupji (or opji), or wraith (ghost).

== Close relatives ==
The wupji is a very similar legend to the vjesci. The wupji in Kashubia had two teeth instead of a caul at birth and was foreordained to become a vampire. Unlike the vjesci, there was no possibility of altering its destiny. Similarly, the nachzehrer was a vampiric legend said to begin from a child born with a caul, especially if the caul was red. The nachzehrer was also associated with epidemic sickness.
