= Sasabonsam =

Vampire-like folkloric being from the Akan people

The Sasabonsam, or sometimes Asanbosam, or asasabonsam, is a vampire-like folkloric being from the Akan people. It belongs to the folklore of the Akan of southern Ghana, as well as Côte d'Ivoire, Togo and 18th century Jamaica from enslaved Akan. It is said to have iron teeth and long hair and lives in trees, attacking from above. In the forests of West Africa, there were rules of renewal, and the Sasabonsam would enforce these rules. They take up territory in the trees in the forests, where they live and feed on people that wander into their home. In mythology, it is usually portrayed as an archetypical ogre; according to A Dictionary of World Mythology:

...the hairy Sasabonsam has large blood-shot eyes, long legs, and feet pointing both ways. Its favourite trick is to sit on the high branches of a tree and dangle its legs so as to entangle the unwary hunter.

Both the ogre and vampire versions have iron teeth.

Names and descriptions of the creature vary slightly among various ethnic groups in the region. The Asante of Ghana called the iron-toothed tree dweller the asasabonsam.
