= Pricolici =

Werewolf and vampire in Romanian folklore

A Pricolici (pronounced /pri.koˈlit͡ʃʲ/) (same form in plural) is a Romanian vampire with werewolf-like attributes, transformed from a child breastfed after its mother has weaned it risks.

Pricolici are similar to a vârcolac, although the latter sometimes symbolises a goblin, whereas the pricolici always has wolf-like characteristics, they have the ability to transform into ordinary people or animals. They also have similarities with strigoi, undead souls that have risen from the grave to harm living people. While a strigoi possesses anthropomorphic qualities similar to the ones it had before death, a pricolici always resembles a wolf or dog. Malicious, violent men are often said to become pricolici after death, in order to continue harming other humans.

Some Romanian folklore delineates that Pricolici are werewolves in life and after they die, return as vampires. This also gives rise to the legend of vampires that can turn into animals such as wolves, dogs, or owls and bats. The common theme of all these animals being that they are nocturnal hunters much like vampires.

Even as recently as modern times, many people living in rural areas of Romania have claimed to have been viciously attacked by abnormally large and fierce wolves. Apparently, these wolves attack silently, unexpectedly and only solitary targets. Victims of such attacks often claim that their aggressor wasn't an ordinary wolf, but a pricolici who has come back to life to continue wreaking havoc.

The Pricolici is also known to simply be a bi-morph version of werewolf that walks upright on two legs as opposed to the classic form of werewolf that presents as a very large wolf or canidae of some kind walking on all four legs.

The etymology of the word is unknown; although it probably has Latin origins from the word "Lycus" i.e "wolf" (prico+lici).
