= Adze (folklore) =

African mythological creature

The adze is a vampiric being in Ewe folklore, told by the people of Togo and Ghana. In the wild, the adze takes the form of a firefly, though it will transform into human shape upon capture. When in human form, the adze has the power to possess humans.

People, male or female, possessed by an adze are viewed as witches (Ewe: abasom). The adze's influence would negatively affect the people who lived around their host. A person is suspected of being possessed in a variety of situations, including: women with brothers (especially if their brother's children fared better than their own), old people (if the young suddenly started dying and the old stayed alive) and the poor (if they envied the rich). The adze's effects are generally felt by the possessed victim's family or those of whom the victim is jealous.

In firefly form, the adze would travel through keyholes, cracks in walls, or under closed doors at night. Once in the home, it would suck blood from people as they slept, making them fall sick and die. Tales of the creature and its effects were probably an attempt to describe the potentially deadly effects of mosquitoes and malaria. There is no defense against an adze.

== See also ==
- Chonchon
- Soucouyant
