= The Vourdalak =

2023 French horror film

- French theatrical release poster
- French: Le Vourdalak
- Directed by: Adrien Beau
- Screenplay by: Adrien Beau; Hadrien Bouvier
- Based on: The Family of the Vourdalak by Aleksey Konstantinovich Tolstoy
- Produced by: Judith Lou Lévy; Lola Pacchioni; Marco Pacchioni
- Starring: Kacey Mottet Klein; Ariane Labed; Grégoire Colin
- Cinematography: David Chizallet
- Edited by: Alan Jobart
- Music by: Maïa Xifaras; Martin Le Nouvel
- Production companies: Les films du bal Master Movies
- Distributed by: The Jokers
- Release dates: 2 September 2023 (Venice); 25 October 2023
- Running time: 91 minutes
- Country: France
- Language: French
- Box office: $78,527

The Vourdalak (French: Le Vourdalak) is a 2023 French drama-horror film directed by Adrien Beau, in his feature film debut, co-written by Beau and Hadrien Bouvier, based on Aleksey Konstantinovich Tolstoy's 1839 novella The Family of the Vourdalak. Starring Kacey Mottet Klein, Ariane Labed, Grégoire Colin, and Vassili Schneider.

The film had its world premiere in the Critics Week section of the 80th Venice International Film Festival on 2 September 2023. It was theatrically released in France on 25 October by The Jokers, to critical acclaim.

== Plot ==
In 18th-century Eastern Europe, French Marquis Jacques Saturnin du Antoine loses his horse and companions through being robbed. A stranger advises him to go to the house of a man named Gorcha. Jacques Antoine eventually reaches Gorcha's house where the latter's family resides.

Gorcha's elder son, Jegor, soon arrives home, having spent the past month seeking revenge against the Turks who pillaged the village. Gorcha left to fight the Turks, and had said that if he did not return within six days, it would be because he had died fighting; if he should return after those six days, he would have become a vourdalak and nobody should let him in. Jegor, however, does not believe in vourdalaks. He knows where a horse for Jacques Antoine can be found, but it would have to wait until the next day.

Jacques Antoine eventually approaches Gorcha's daughter Sdenka and aggressively tries to seduce her. In turn, she tricks him into almost falling off a cliff. He learns that Sdenka once had a lover, and because everyone in the area knows, she now cannot get married. She was planning to flee with her lover, but someone found out and killed him.

That evening, six days since Gorcha left, he is spotted lying at the edge of the forest, looking like a corpse. The dog of Gorcha's youngest son, Piotr, will not stop barking at the old man. Jegor compels Piotr to shoot it. Gorcha reveals that he slayed the band of Turks' leader, whom Jegor failed to kill.

That night, Jacques Antoine has nightmares about Gorcha. The following day, Gorcha is missing and Jegor's son Vlad is unwell.

That night, Jacques Antoine sees Vlad walking outside. He appears to be sleepwalking, and Gorcha is nearby, chewing on his shroud. Jacques Antoine attempts to subdue Gorcha, who hurls him against a tree before drinking Vlad's blood. Jacques Antoine awakens the next morning and finds the family digging Vlad's grave.

During the funeral, Piotr and Sdenka encourage Jegor to drive the stake through Vlad's heart. However, Gorcha interrupts him, reproaching the family for Vlad's death. Piotr begins to attack Gorcha with the stake, but loses his nerve. Gorcha implies to Sdenka that it was he himself who was responsible for shooting her lover.

Gorcha compels Jacques Antoine and Sdenka to dance for him. Piotr, whose supposed effeminacy was criticised by Jegor and Gorcha, appears wearing lipstick and flowers, wanting to kill his father, who shoots him dead. Blaming Jacques Antoine for the family's recent misfortunes, Jegor beats him. He announces that Jacques Antoine will be given a horse the next morning and must leave to never return; if he comes back, Jegor will kill him.

Jegor leaves Jacques Antoine bound in the cellar for the night, and he is woken by Vlad calling for his mother, Anja. Outside, Vlad approaches Anja; Jacques Antoine tries to warn her to stay away, to no avail. Mother and son embrace, and he drinks her blood. In the morning, Sdenka approaches Jacques Antoine, declaring that she will throw herself from the cliff, as Piotr was the only thing keeping her alive. She then leaves.

Jegor and Anja, now a vourdalak, give Jacques Antoine a horse. In the woods, however, he cannot find Sdenka. Returning to the house that evening, Jacques Antoine believes that he sees her singing in a bedroom. He tries to convince her to leave, but instead, she seduces him, and they start having sex. However, Jacques Antoine discovers that he is actually interacting with Gorcha, who has been drinking his blood. Jacques Antoine stakes Gorcha and stumbles into the dining room, where Jegor, who has also succumbed to the Vourdalak, is seated around the table with his wife and son as well as the corpses of Piotr and his dead dog. Jacques Antoine sets the house on fire and rides away.

At dawn, he finds Sdenka at the edge of the cliff and convinces her not to jump, informing her that she is free. Having been bitten, Jacques Antoine gives her his horse and a map of Europe before jumping off the cliff. Sdenka rides away, chewing a shroud. A French duchess later takes her in.

== Cast ==
- Kacey Mottet Klein as Marquis Jacques Antoine Saturnin d’Urfe
- Ariane Labed as Sdenka
- Grégoire Colin as Jegor
- Vassili Schneider as Piotr
- Claire Duburcq as Anja
- Gabriel Pavie as Vlad
- Erwan Ribard as The Hermit
- Adrien Beau as Gorcha (voice)

== Production ==
The film is based on the 1839 Aleksey Konstantinovich Tolstoy's gothic novella The Family of the Vourdalak. It is shot in Super 16mm. The soundtrack is inspired by Nino Rota's score in Fellini's Casanova. The character of Gorcha is a marionette.

== Release ==
The film premiered in the International Critics' Week section at the 80th Venice International Film Festival.

== Reception ==
On the review aggregator website Rotten Tomatoes, 96% of 48 critics' reviews are positive, with an average rating of 8.1/10. The site consensus reads: "A visually sumptuous gothic tale with intriguing subtext flowing through its veins, The Vourdalak is a memorably stylish debut for director Adrien Beau." Metacritic, which uses a weighted average, assigned the film a score of 76 out of 100, based on 6 critics, indicating "generally favorable" reviews.

== See also ==
- Black Sabbath, 1963
