= The Family of the Vourdalak =

Novella by Aleksey Konstantinovich Tolstoy

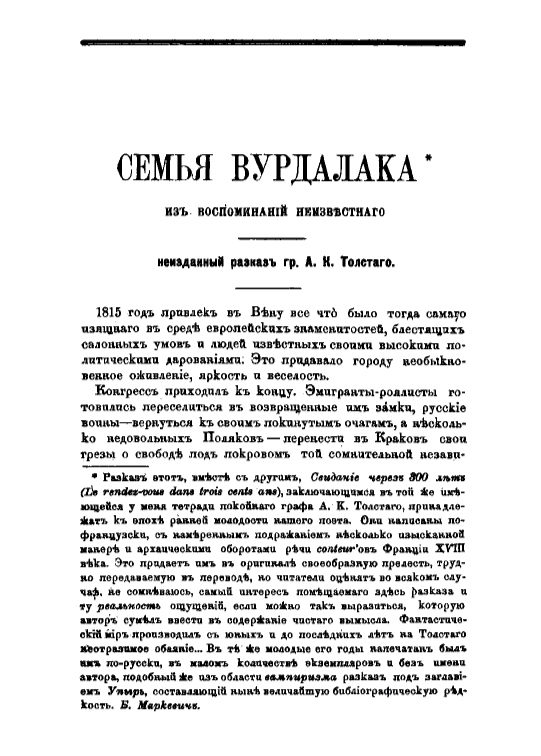
- The Family of the Vourdalak
- Author: Aleksey Konstantinovich Tolstoy
- Original title: La Famille du Vourdalak
- Language: French
- Genre: Gothic fiction
- Publication date: 1884 (Russian), 1950 (French)
- Publication place: France
- Media type: Print (Paperback & Hardback)

The Family of the Vourdalak is a gothic novella by Aleksey Konstantinovich Tolstoy, written in 1839 in French and originally entitled La Famille du Vourdalak. Fragment inedit des Memoires d'un inconnu. Tolstoy wrote it on a trip to France from Frankfurt, where he was attached to the Russian Embassy.

It was translated into Russian by Boleslav Markevich, as "Семья вурдалака" (Sem'yá vurdaláka), published for the first time in The Russian Messenger in January 1884. The original French text appeared in print in 1950, in Revue des Études Slavs, vol.26. The Reunion After Three Hundred Years (Les Rendez-vous Dans Trois Cent Ani) which was written at about the same time and which might be regarded as a sequel (for protagonist Marquis d'Urfe and Countess Grammon appear in it) first appeared in a compilation Le Poète Alexis Tolstoi by André Lirondelle (Paris, 1912).

The word vourdalak occurs first in Pushkin's 1830s poem of the same name, part of his Songs of the Western Slavs cycle, and was taken up in Russian literary language following Pushkin. It is a distortion of words referring to vampires or werewolves in Slavic and Balkan folklore.

== Plot summary ==
Marquis d'Urfé, a young French diplomat, finds himself in a small Serbian village, in the house of an old peasant named Gorcha. The host is absent: he left the house ten days ago along with some other men to hunt for a Turk outlaw, Alibek. Upon leaving he told his sons, Georges (Note: The Serbian form of the name would be Đorđe. The Russian translation uses Георгий (Georgiy).) and Pierre, (Note: The Serbian form of the name would be Petar or Pera. The Russian translation uses Пётр (Pyotr).) that they should wait for him for ten days sharp and, should he come a minute later, kill him by driving an aspen stake through his heart because he would no longer be human but instead a vourdalak (vampire).

The day the Marquis comes to the village is the tenth day of Gorcha's absence. The family awaits the hour with growing anxiety and there he is, appearing on the road at 8 o'clock in the evening, exactly on the time he left ten days ago. His sons are uncertain as to how this strange precision should be interpreted. Georges suspects his father became a vourdalak, Pierre insists otherwise. Then Georges' son dies inexplicably. The French diplomat has to leave the house and continue his travel.

Half a year later on his way back from his mission, d'Urfé returns to the village only to find it abandoned. Coming to the familiar house he stays for the night, being allured by Zdenka, (Note: The Slavic form of the name would be Zdenka (Зденка), which is used in the Russian translation.) Gorcha's daughter he fell in love with during his first visit, who appears to dwell in the empty house. He later realizes that he has fallen under the mind-spell and charms of a vampire. He makes an attempt to leave, comes under a massive attack of vourdalaks, with the entire Gorcha family among them, and makes a miraculous escape, having to thank his own good luck and the agility of his horse.

== In film ==
The novella became the basis for "I Wurdulak", one of the three parts of Mario Bava's 1963 film Black Sabbath, featuring Boris Karloff. The 1972 Italian/Spanish film The Night of the Devils and the 2023 French film The Vourdalak are also based on Tolstoy's story. A glancing reference to the novella occurs in Guy Wilson's 2012 film, Werewolf: The Beast Among Us, when an undead victim of a werewolf attack arises and is shot by the grandson of the Great Hunter who exclaims, "I hate goddamn Vourdalaks." Episode 1 of the animated horror anthology series, "Red Iron road" is called "family of the Vourdalak" and follows the Tolstoy novel.

== English translation ==
- Vampires: Stories of the Supernatural, Hawthorn Books, 1973. ISBN 080158292X
- Horror Historia Red, CSRC Storytelling, 2023. ISBN 1955382190
