= Earth (British band) =

British psychedelic rock band

Earth, initially credited as The Earth, was a British psychedelic music band active from 1968 to 1969. The pioneering heavy metal band Black Sabbath–then known as "Earth"–rechristened their hard-edged blues band after the 1963 horror film in order to avoid confusion with this band.

The line-up included The Misunderstood's Glenn Campbell on steel guitar and Robin Parnell on bass guitar. The band released two singles and recorded radio sessions for the BBC. After the second single Campbell disbanded Earth and formed Juicy Lucy.

== Discography ==
The band's songs were written by David Bolitho:

- The Earth: "Everybody Sing the Song", B-side "Stranger of Fortune" Decca April 1969
- Earth: "Resurrection City", B-side "Comical Man" CBS December 1969
