= Vourdalak =

Russian legendary creature

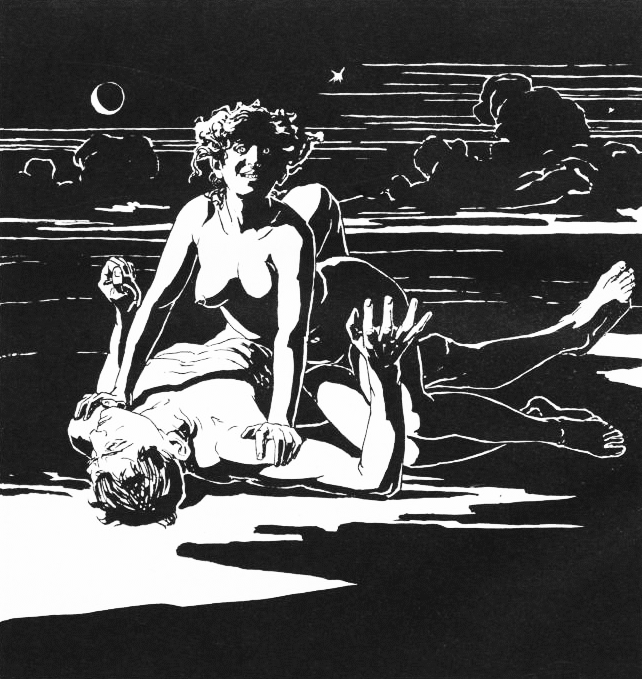
Vampir by Ernst Stöhr, 1899

Vourdalak, also spelled wurdalak, verdilak, vurdulak or vurdalak (Russian: вурдалак), is a kind of vampire originating in Russian literature. Some Western sources define it as a type of "Russian vampire" that must consume the blood of its loved ones and convert its whole family. This notion is based apparently on Alexey K. Tolstoy's novella The Family of the Vourdalak, telling the story of one such Slavic family.

In Russia, the common name for vampire is upyr (Russian: упырь). Nowadays, the upyr and vourdalak are regarded as synonymous; however, in the 19th century, they were seen as separate but similar entities. The Russian upyr was said to be a former witch, werewolf or a particularly nasty sinner who had been excommunicated from the church. In Ukraine, the upyri were also feared as the vampires who could bring about droughts and epidemics.

In the Russian language, the word vourdalak first appeared in the early 19th century, and became common due to Alexander Pushkin's 1836 poem of the same name, part of the Songs of the Western Slavs cycle. It is the corrupt form of the West Slavic word volkodlak (Russian: волкодлак), meaning literally 'wolf-fur' or 'wolf-hide', denoting someone "wearing" a wolf's skin, a werewolf. Other sources suggest that Pushkin borrowed and adapted the word from Lord Byron's "The Giaour", which contains a footnote claiming that the Greek word for a vampire is "Vardoulacha". This in itself is a corruption of vrykolakas, which does come from the Slavic vukodlak.

== In popular culture ==
Wurdalaks are mentioned and appear in the 2012 horror film Werewolf: The Beast Among Us.

In 2023, Sam J. Miller's short story "If Someone You Love Has Become a Vurdalak", published in The Dark, was nominated for the Bram Stoker Award for Superior Achievement in Short Fiction. The 2023 French horror-drama film The Vourdalak also centres on them.

The wurdulac also appears in the horror film Black Sabbath: "The Wurdulak", which is an adaptation of Tolstoy's The Family of the Vourdalak.

== See also ==
- Pricolici – Werewolf and vampire in Romanian folklore
- Strigoi – Vampires or troubled spirits from Romanian folklore
- Vampires in popular culture § Vourdalak (or wurdalak)
