= Colours of Time (film) =

2025 film

- Theatrical release poster
- French: La Venue de l'avenir
- Literally: The Arrival of the Future
- Directed by: Cédric Klapisch
- Written by: Cédric Klapisch; Santiago Amigorena
- Produced by: Bruno Levy
- Starring: Suzanne Lindon; Abraham Wapler; Vincent Macaigne; Julia Piaton; Zinedine Soualem; Paul Kircher; Vassili Schneider; Sara Giraudeau; Cécile de France
- Cinematography: Alexis Kavyrchine
- Edited by: Anne-Sophie Bion
- Music by: Robin Coudert
- Production companies: Ce Qui Me Meut; StudioCanal; France 2 Cinéma; Panache Productions; La Compagnie Cinématographique
- Distributed by: StudioCanal
- Release dates: 22 May 2025 (Cannes); 22 May 2025 (France)
- Running time: 126 minutes
- Countries: France; Belgium
- Language: French
- Budget: €15.67 million
- Box office: $8.9 million

Colours of Time (French: La Venue de l'avenir, lit. 'The Arrival of the Future') is a 2025 period drama film co-written and directed by Cédric Klapisch. Starring Suzanne Lindon, Abraham Wapler, Vincent Macaigne, Julia Piaton, Zinedine Soualem and Paul Kircher, it follows four cousins who inherit a house in rural Normandy and retrace the steps of their ancestors in 19th-century Paris. The film is a co-production between France and Belgium.

According to Klapisch, the film is "about the importance of the past. We can’t move forward if we don’t have a look at the past. The two stories we tell in this film concern people who do retrospective work. Adèle sets out to open out who her parents were. The four cousins want to know who their ancestors were".

The film had its world premiere at the 78th Cannes Film Festival on 22 May 2025, and was theatrically released in France on the same day by StudioCanal.

== Plot ==
Four distant cousins are part of a wider family group which can be traced to the last occupant of a house in rural Normandy abandoned in 1944. Seb, Abdel, Céline and Guy, discover there the existence of Adèle Vermillard, their ancestor who in 1895 aged 21 left her native Normandy for Paris in search of her mother. While exploring the house, left untouched since the 1940s, they excavate the life of their ancestor - photos and paintings from the end of the 19th century are preserved in the house, along with letters to Adèle which help them form a picture of her story. On her journey to Paris Adèle becomes friends with two aspiring artists; Anatole, a painter and Lucien, a photographer, who accompany her in the search for her parents. In the course of their modern-day discoveries the cousins find in the relics of the past what will call into question their present.

== Cast ==
- Suzanne Lindon as Adèle Vermillard
- Abraham Wapler as Seb / Claude Monet in 1874
- Vincent Macaigne as Guy
- Julia Piaton as Céline
- Zinedine Soualem as Abdel
- Paul Kircher as Anatole
- Vassili Schneider as Lucien
- Sara Giraudeau as Odette
- Cécile de France as Calixte de La Ferrière
- Olivier Gourmet as Claude Monet
- Fred Testot as Félix Nadar
- Claire Pommet as Fleur, the singer
- François Berléand as Victor Hugo
- Philippine Leroy-Beaulieu as Sarah Bernhardt
- Vincent Perez as Lucien's uncle
- Raïka Hazanavicius as Rose
- Louise Pascal as Nadar's client
- François Chattot as Seb's grandfather

== Production ==
Colours of Time was produced by Klapisch's longtime producing partner Bruno Levy through their company Ce Qui Me Meut. It was co-produced by StudioCanal, France 2 Cinéma and Belgian companies Panache Productions and La Compagnie Cinématographique. The film was pre-purchased by Canal+ and Ciné+ and received support from the Normandy and Île-de-France regions, where the film was shot. Alexis Kavyrchine served as the director of photography. Principal photography began on 15 April 2024, and was projected to conclude on 24 June 2024. Filming locations in Normandy included La Vespière-Friardel (Calvados), Mesnils-sur-Iton (Eure) and Étretat (Seine-Maritime). Claude Monet's house and gardens in Giverny also served as a filming location for the film. The crew also shot scenes on a Nomad Train during a round trip between Paris's Gare Saint-Lazare and the city of Le Havre. Shooting also took place in Val-d'Oise, near La Roche-Guyon, as well as in Theuville.

== Release ==
International sales were handled by StudioCanal. In January 2025, StudioCanal unveiled a promotional trailer to distributors during the Unifrance Rendez-Vous in Paris.

The film was selected to be screened out of competition at the 78th Cannes Film Festival, where it had its world premiere on 22 May 2025 and was theatrically released in France on the same day by StudioCanal.

A blu-ray of the film, containing a feature 'Cédric Klapisch et les couleurs de l'impressionisme' and deleted scenes was issued in September 2025.

== Reception ==
=== Box office ===
The film had 911k admissions at the French box office, grossing $7.5 million. In Italy the film grossed $1 million. Bringing its worldwide box office totals to $9 million.

=== Critical response ===
On review aggregator website Rotten Tomatoes, the film holds an approval rating of 96% based on 25 reviews, with an average rating of 7.5/10.

Metacritic, which uses a weighted average, assigned the film a score of 64 out of 100, based on 5 critics, indicating "generally favorable" reviews.
