= Vassili Schneider =

French Canadian actor (born 1999)

- Vassili Schneider, 2025
- Born: 9 January 1999 (age 27); Montreal, Quebec, Canada
- Occupation: Actor
- Years active: 2009–present
- Relatives: Niels Schneider (brother); Aliocha Schneider (brother)

Vassili Schneider (born January 9, 1999) is a Canadian actor best known for his role as Albert in The Count of Monte Cristo (2024). He made his professional acting debut in the 2009 film The Master Key. He was in The Vourdalak (2023).

== Background ==
Born in Montreal, he is the younger brother of Niels Schneider, who was born in Paris before his parents moved the family to Canada. They are among five sons, including Vadim, Aliocha and born to parents who were an actor and a model. His paternal grandmother was a Russian Jewish immigrant to France, who came with her family as a child when they fled the Russian Revolution in 1920. Each of the sons went into acting. Vassili was only four years old when his brother, Vadim Schneider, and co-star, Jaclyn Linetsky, both aged 17, tragically died in a car accident while filming an episode of "15/Love." Inspired by his brother Niels, who enjoyed a successful career in French cinema, Vassili decided to join acting school. He made his television debut in the series "Adulthood" in 2017, followed by various television shows and telemovies, including "The Story of Annette Zelman," which is based on the real-life love story of Jean Jausion and Annette Zelman.

Schneider achieved his breakthrough role in the 2024 epic film The Count of Monte Cristo playing Albert de Morcerf. His on-screen chemistry with Anamaria Vartolomei earned praise from critics. He joined Cédric Klapisch's upcoming film Colours of Time.

== Filmography ==
- Les Misérables (2026)
- Colours of Time (2025)
- The Count of Monte Cristo (2024) as Albert de Morcerf
- The Vourdalak (2023) as Piotr
- Voltaire High (2021) as Joseph Descamps
- Notre-Dame (2022)
- Forever Young
- Slut in a Good Way (2019)

== Television ==
- The Story of Annette Zelman (2022)
- Agatha Christie's Little Murders (2021)
- Voltaire High (2021)
- HPI (2021)
- Possessions (2020)
- States of Emergency (2019)
- Ad Vitam (2018)
- We'll see that in post-production (2017)
- Adulthood
