= The Night of the Devils =

- Directed by: Giorgio Ferroni
- Screenplay by: Romano Migliorini; Giambattista Mussetto
- Story by: Eduardo Manzanos Brochero
- Based on: The Family of the Vourdalak by Aleksey Konstantinovich Tolstoy
- Produced by: Luigi Mariani; Eduardo Manzanos Brochero
- Starring: Gianni Garko; Agostina Belli
- Cinematography: Manuel Berenguer
- Edited by: Gianmaria Messeri
- Music by: Giorgio Gaslini
- Production companies: Filmes Cinematografica; Due Emme Cinematografica; Copercines; Cooperativa Cinemátografica
- Distributed by: P.A.C.
- Release dates: 29 April 1972 (Italy); 25 June 1973 (Spain)
- Running time: 89 minutes
- Countries: Italy; Spain
- Box office: ₤156.686 million

The Night of the Devils (Italian: La notte dei diavoli, Spanish: La noche de los diablos) is a 1972 film directed by Giorgio Ferroni. It is loosely based on the Aleksey Konstantinovich Tolstoy's novel The Family of the Vourdalak.

== Plot ==
The patriarch of a wealthy family fears that he will show up one day in vampire form. Should this happen, he warns his family not to let him back in his house, no matter how much he begs them.

== Cast ==
- Gianni Garko: Nicola
- Agostina Belli: Sdenka
- Roberto Maldera: Jovan
- Bill Vanders: Gorka Ciuvelak
- Cinzia De Carolis: Irina
- Maria Monti: Witch
- Teresa Gimpera: Elena
- Umberto Raho: Dr. Tosi

== Production ==
The Night of the Devils was an Italian and Spanish co-production financed by Eduardo Manzanos Brochero's Copercines and two Italian companies: Filmes and Due Emme. The latter company was founded in 1971 by Roberto Maldera who also had a main role in the film, and Luigi Mariani. The Night of the Devils was shot in five weeks starting in late 1971 to early 1972 near Bracciano Lake. Director Ferroni was 63 when directing the film and nearly deaf and had to shoot the film with the assistance of a hearing aid.

== Release ==
The Night of the Devils was distributed theatrically in Italy on 29 April 1972 where it was distributed by P.A.C. It grossed a total of 156,686,000 Italian lire in Italy. It was released in Spain on 25 June 1973.

== Reception ==
In a contemporary review, Nigel Andrews reviewed a dubbed 88 minute version. Andrews stated that despite "the brief surrealist promise of the opening scenes-a close-up of a face crawling with larvae cutting ingeniously to Niccola's head enveloped in the serpentine wires of an encephalograph", Night of the Devils had "all the usual defects of a low-budget horror quickie-careless direction, mechanical performances, some obtrusively unconvincing day-for-night sequences" find that the film "provides little in the way of style to compensate for a story which staggers dully from one bloodthirsty set-piece to another."
