= Black Sabbath (film) =

1963 film by Mario Bava

- Italian release poster
- Italian: I tre volti della paura
- Directed by: Mario Bava
- Screenplay by: Marcello Fondato; Alberto Bevilacqua; Mario Bava
- Story by: Anton Checkov; Aleksey Tolstoy; Guy de Maupassant
- Produced by: Lionello Santi; Alberto Barsanti
- Starring: Boris Karloff; Mark Damon; Michèle Mercier; Susy Andersen; Lydia Alfonsi; Glauco Onorato; Jacqueline Pierreux
- Cinematography: Ubaldo Terzano; Mario Bava
- Edited by: Mario Serandrei
- Music by: Roberto Nicolosi
- Production companies: Galatea Film; Emmepi Cinematografica; Lyre Film
- Distributed by: Warner Bros. (Italy); The Rank Organisation (France)
- Release dates: 17 August 1963 (Italy); 17 November 1965 (France)
- Running time: 93 minutes
- Countries: Italy; France
- Language: Italian
- Budget: ₤205 million Italian lire
- Box office: ₤103.5 million Italian lire (Italy) $419,000 (US rentals)

Black Sabbath (Italian: I tre volti della paura, lit. 'The Three Faces of Fear') is a 1963 horror anthology film directed by Mario Bava. The film consists of three separate tales that are introduced by Boris Karloff. The order in which the stories are presented varies among the different versions in which the film has been released. In the original, Italian print, the first story, titled "The Telephone", involves Rosy (Michèle Mercier) who continually receives threatening telephone calls from an unseen stalker. The second is "The Wurdulak", where a man named Gorca (Karloff) returns to his family after claiming to have slain a Wurdulak, an undead creature who attacks those that it had once loved. The third story, "The Drop of Water", is centered on Helen Corey (Jacqueline Pierreux), a nurse who steals a valuable ring from a corpse that is being prepared for burial and finds herself haunted by the ring's original owner after arriving home.

Being a low-budget horror film with multiple stories, an international cast and foreign financial backing, Black Sabbath follows numerous trends of 1960s Italian film productions. The film is credited to three writers, Anton Chekov, Aleksey Tolstoy and Guy de Maupassant, but is predominantly based on several uncredited sources, and changes were made to the script after filming commenced. American International Pictures and Titra Sound Corporation suggested changes to Bava during filming to make the film palatable for American audiences, and created their own English-language version of the film, which replaced Roberto Nicolosi's score with music by Les Baxter, removed several depictions of graphic violence and made alterations to other scenes. This version greatly changed the plot of "The Telephone", giving it a supernatural element and removing all references to lesbianism and prostitution.

Black Sabbath was a commercial failure upon release in Italy, and performed below expectations in America. A spiritual sequel to the film, based on "The Dunwich Horror" and provisionally titled Scarlet Friday, was set to reunite Bava with Karloff and co-star Christopher Lee, but AIP distanced themselves from Bava following the failure of Dr. Goldfoot and the Girl Bombs and eventually produced the film without Bava, Karloff or Lee's involvement. Plans for a remake were announced in 2004 with Jonathan Hensleigh attached to write the script. Since its original release, Black Sabbath has received positive reviews from critics, and was placed at number 73 on a Time Out poll of the best horror films.

== Plot ==
=== "The Telephone" ===
Rosy, a French call-girl, returns to her basement apartment at night. She receives a series of strange phone calls. The caller eventually identifies himself as Frank, her former pimp who has recently escaped from prison. Rosy is terrified knowing that it was her testimony that sent Frank to prison. Rosy phones her friend and former lover Mary for solace. The women have been estranged, but Rosy is certain that only Mary can help her. Mary agrees to come over that night. Seconds later, Frank calls again, promising that no matter what Rosy does he will have his revenge. Rosy doesn't realize that Mary is impersonating Frank on the telephone. Mary arrives at Rosy's apartment and attempts to calm Rosy's nerves. Mary provides Rosy with a large knife for protection before she goes to sleep.

As Rosy sleeps, Mary writes a confession explaining that she made the calls to force a reunion, knowing that Rosy would call on her for help. While she is writing Frank quietly enters the apartment and strangles Mary, believing her to be Rosy. The sound of their struggle awakens Rosy, and Frank realizes he murdered the wrong woman. Frank approaches Rosy's bed, but she seizes her knife and stabs Frank. Rosy drops the knife and breaks down in hysteria.

=== "The Wurdulak" ===
In 19th-century Serbia, Vladimir D'Urfe is a young nobleman who finds a beheaded corpse with a dagger plunged into its heart. He takes the blade, and finds shelter in a small farmhouse. D'Urfe is approached by Giorgio, who explains that the knife belongs to his father, Gorca, who has not been seen for five days. Giorgio offers a room to D'Urfe and introduces him to the rest of the family: his wife Maria, their young son Ivan, Giorgio's younger brother Pietro, and his sister Sdenka. They all await the return of Gorca, who has gone hunting for a Turkish brigand who's actually a wurdalak, a type of vampire that is compelled to feed on the blood of loved ones. At midnight, Gorca returns to the cottage with a sour demeanor and unkempt appearance. After the family goes to sleep, Ivan and Pietro are attacked by Gorca, who flees the cottage with Ivan. Giorgio chases after Gorca but only returns with Ivan's corpse. Giorgio plans to stab Ivan in the heart as he has done for Pietro to prevent him from reviving as a Wurdalak, but is prevented from doing so by a frantic Maria. The two agree to give their son a burial.

That same night, Ivan appears outside and begs to be invited in. Giorgio is stabbed by Maria while she attempts to let in her son. On opening the door, she is greeted by Gorca, who bites her. Vladimir and Sdenka flee from the house and hide in the ruins of a deserted monastery. As Vladimir sleeps, Sdenka walks outside and finds Gorca and their family surrounding her. Vladimir awakens and searches for Sdenka, finding her lying in her bed at home. She begs him to leave but Vladimir refuses, saying he would rather die than lose her. As Vladimir embraces her, she bites his neck while the rest of her family watch through the window.

=== "The Drop of Water" ===
In 1910s London, Nurse Helen Chester is called by the maid of an elderly medium to prepare the latter's corpse for burial. As she dresses the body, she notices an expensive sapphire ring on its finger. Chester steals it, accidentally tipping over a glass of water which drips on the floor; she is then annoyed by a fly. Chester takes the ring home to her flat and witnesses strange events. The fly returns and continues to pester her and the lights in her apartment go out as the sound of the dripping water is heard from various locations. Chester sees the woman's corpse lying on her bed. It rises and floats towards her. Chester begs for forgiveness but the corpse appears to strangle her - in reality she strangles herself. The next morning, the concierge discovers Chester's body and calls the police. The pathologist arrives to examine the body and only finds a small bruise on her left finger where the ring had been. As the doctor announces this observation, the concierge appears distressed and hears the dripping of water.

== Cast ==
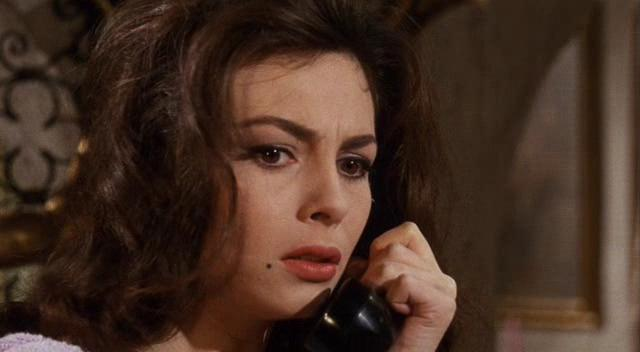
Michèle Mercier as Rosy in "The Telephone"

The Telephone

- Michèle Mercier as Rosy
- Lidia Alfonsi as Mary
- Milo Quesada as Frank (uncredited)

The Wurdulak

- Boris Karloff as Gorca
- Mark Damon as Count Vladimir D'Urfe
- Susy Andersen as Sdenka
- Massimo Righi as Pietro
- Rika Dialina as Maria
- Glauco Onorato as Giorgio

The Drop of Water

- Jacqueline Pierreux as Helen Chester
- Milly Monti as the Maid
- Harriet Medin as the Concierge
- Gustavo De Nardo as the Police Inspector
- Alessandro Tedeschi as the Coroner (uncredited)

== Production ==
=== Development ===
In 1958, American International Pictures founders James H. Nicholson and Samuel Z. Arkoff hired Italian talent agent and producer Fulvio Lucisano to look for commercially viable Italian films for them after the large success of the Italian feature Hercules (1958). In February 1963, American International Pictures made a deal with the Italian film production company Galatea that they would contribute to a minimum of nine co-productions in the next eight years. Black Sabbath follows many production trends of Italian films of the era. These co-productions were influenced by the lack of big film stars in Italy. To avoid high costs or big stars, producers created anthology films involving three or four short narratives whose combined running time was that of a regular feature film, as in Yesterday, Today and Tomorrow (1963). A second trend was to match an up-and-coming actor or a much older actor with a European ingenue actress, as in Spy in Your Eye which paired Pier Angeli and Dana Andrews. The third trend was the move towards making Westerns and horror films which were less expensive to produce than the earlier sword-and-sandal films.

=== Pre-production ===
The casting and crewing of Black Sabbath was divided between the film's three main production partners: Galatea cast actress Susy Andersen while retaining Mario Bava, who had directed several of their films, including Black Sunday, American International Pictures secured Mark Damon and Boris Karloff, and Societé Cinématographique Lyre secured Michèle Mercier and Jacqueline Pierreux (the latter is credited under the pseudonym "Jacqueline Soussard" on American prints). Mercier had previously worked with Bava on The Wonders of Aladdin (1961), for which he had directed its second unit.

Bava is credited as writing the film's script along with Alberto Bevilacqua and Marcello Fondato. The film's opening credits credit the stories as "The Drop of Water" by Anton Chekov, "Sem'ya vurdalaka" by Aleksey Tolstoy and "The Telephone" by Guy de Maupassant. Bava later took credit for the original story of "The Drop of Water", but Italian critic Antonio Bruscini traced its origins to a story titled "Dalle tre alle tre e mezzo" ("Between Three and Three-thirty") that was included in a 1960 anthology book titled Storie di fantasmi (Ghost Stories). British historian Julian Granger identified the author of the story as Franco Lucentini. Lucentini used the pseudonym P. Kettridge and presented the story as a translation of the fictitious English story "Ghost Don't Kill". "The Wurdulak" is loosely based on The Family of the Vourdalak by Aleksey Konstantinovich Tolstoy. The story of "The Wurdulak" was found in the 1960 anthology I vampiri tra noi. Other parts of the story were inspired by the Guy de Maupassant story "Fear" and Bram Stoker's Dracula. "The Telephone" was also attributed to the purported author F. G. Snyder. However, in the audio commentary for the Anchor Bay DVD release, Tim Lucas argued that the story was inspired by Maupassant's short story "The Horla".

Bevilacqua stated that Bava wanted to create stories about how terror can strike mankind in different time periods and asked his screenwriters to get him stories from books. After Bevilacqua finished his draft the screenplay, Marcello Fondato was brought in to work on it. Bevilacqua claimed that he was recalled for later rewrites but that most of his added material was cut from the final film. American International Pictures approved of Bava's thematic idea but encouraged him to look for public domain titles.

It was decided early in production that Boris Karloff would not only star in one of the tales, but also act as the film's host; he had recently hosted his own anthology television series, Thriller. Karloff was under contract with American International Pictures, and had just completed filming The Raven for them. The film's cinematographer is credited as Ubaldo Terzano but Bava shot several scenes himself without credit.

=== Filming ===
Black Sabbath was made at the end of production of The Girl Who Knew Too Much during an eight-week period between February and March 1963. American International's involvement with the film allowed Salvatore Billitteri of Titra Sound Corporation to be on set to supervise the film for dubbing on its English-language release. As the film was going to be dubbed in different languages, actors could no longer phonetically pronounce their dialogue as it had to be done rhythmically to match various languages. Billitteri was also on set to give suggestions to Bava on how to make his film more appropriate for American audiences, which led to decreasing the amount of violence in the film. The film was first conceived under the title The Fear.

Bava wanted to include a contemporary story which led to the development of "The Telephone". "The Telephone" has been described as one of Bava's first attempts at a giallo film. The giallo film is a style of Italian film that involves a murder mystery that emphasized stylish visuals, flamboyant music and violence. "The Telephone" was Bava's first color film that attempted to emulate the visual style of the covers that appeared on giallo digests. Some of the set pieces for "The Telephone" were taken from the black-and-white giallo film The Girl Who Knew Too Much (1962).

"The Wurdulak" was the last of the short films to be shot, with shooting commencing on either February 25 or 27. While filming, Karloff contracted pneumonia, which led to him having to rely on oxygen tanks after production ended. Bava was initially going to end the film on a shot of Jacqueline Pierreux's dead character. On the last day of filming, Billitteri suggested to not end the film on such a bleak image and told Bava to change it. Bava changed the ending to Boris Karloff's character of Gorca on horseback who cautions the audience to watch out for vampires. The camera then pans back revealing he is on a stuffed horse revealing the studio set and simulated effects.

=== Post-production ===
Two screenshots of the same scene from "The Wurdulak". The top image is from the Italian version supervised by Mario Bava. The second is from American International's print.

By the 1960s, Italian horror films such as Black Sabbath were more violent, sexualized and downbeat than the horror films created in America. American International Pictures focused on a youth-oriented audience whereas horror in Europe was intended for adults. This led to the American edit removing plot elements of prostitution and lesbianism and making the most altered of Bava's films on its English-language version. American International Pictures made changes to all three stories and intro segments in the English-language version of the film. The company re-arranged the order of the stories to start with "The Drop of Water", followed by "The Telephone" and then "The Wurdalak". Changes were then made to the plots, the most extensively edited being "The Telephone". In "The Telephone" any suggestion of a lesbian relationship between Rosy and Mary and references to prostitution were removed. The character of Frank is also no longer a pimp but a ghost who leaves behind a note that eerily writes itself as soon as the envelope it is contained in is opened. A new character is introduced named "The Colonel" who is Rosy's neighbor in the film. "The Wurdalak" features alternative cuts of certain scenes and has violence trimmed from the Italian version. "The Drop of Water" features the fewest changes from the Italian version. American International Pictures reshot the wraparounds with Boris Karloff in Los Angeles. It is unknown who directed these scenes.

American International Pictures replaced Roberto Nicolosi's soundtrack from the original film with a soundtrack from Les Baxter. Kim Newman described Baxter's score as "inappropriate" with "each shock is accompanied by overdone 'scary music'". Both the Italian- and English-language films have a different look. Bava supervised the Italian-language version at Technicolor Roma under his own supervision, while American International Pictures shipped their version to Pathé Color for processing. Mario Bava biographer Tim Lucas described the English-language print as looking "warmer, but less nuanced, with flatter tonalities" and that it "doesn't look bad" but that the Italian version "looks more vibrant, more flamboyantly nightmarish".

== Release ==
The film opened in Italy through Warner Bros. on August 17, 1963, under the title I tre volti della paura (transl. The Three Faces of Fear). It was initially restricted to viewers aged 18 and over, but the age restriction was lowered to 14 and over on October 11. Black Sabbath grossed 103.5 million Italian lira (equivalent to $65,000) on its original Italian release compared to its 205 million lira budget, making the film a box office bomb. Co-writer Alberto Bevilacqua suggested that the film's poor performance was possibly affected by bad publicity, recalling that "someone had a miscarriage while watching it, or some other upsetting thing happened".

American International Pictures released the English version of Black Sabbath on May 6, 1964, as a double bill with AIP's edit of Bava's The Girl Who Knew Too Much, then titled Evil Eye. The English title of Black Sabbath was chosen to connect it with Bava's previous film Black Sunday. In the US, Black Sabbath was only a modest success, earning $419,000 in domestic rentals, less than two-thirds of Black Sunday's earnings of $706,000. While praising Reynold Brown's artwork for AIP's advertising campaign, Lucas has suggested that its failure to capitalize on Karloff's popularity among young audiences was a key factor in the film's relatively meager commercial performance. The film was released by The Rank Organisation in France on 17 November 1965, under the title Les trois visages de la peur; Lucas deemed one of the poster artworks used for the French release, created by Boris Grinsson and depicting Mercier, Andersen and Pierreux being menaced by a would-be strangler's hands, to be the "most beautiful" of all promotional materials produced for the film.

=== Home media ===
The film was released on DVD in 2000. Kino released the film on Blu-ray and DVD on July 16, 2013. Kino's edition of the film was mastered in high definition from the 35mm negative with the Italian language dub and original soundtrack. Arrow Films released Black Sabbath on DVD and Blu-ray in 2013. Arrow's transfer of the Italian version was from an original 35mm internegative print transferred in Italy that had additional grading and restoration done in London. Arrow's version of the American version of Black Sabbath was made from a 35mm interpositive in California. Arrow noted the high definition master they received from Italy was very difficult to restore as the master had issues with the image, sound and color quality and had the stories in the wrong order.

== Reception ==
In a contemporary review of the American International Picture's edit, The Globe and Mail stated that "The Drop of Water" and "The Telephone" were "a good deal more sophisticated than usual horror fare" while "The Wurdulak" "bears no trace of [Bava's] manner of directing" and that the acting was "rudimentary". The Boston Globe gave the film a negative review, referring to the Black Sabbath as "three short films botched together". The Monthly Film Bulletin stated that "the eeriest thing about the picture is its decor (especially the heavy, dusty interiors of [The Drop of Water]" while noting the "acting is very unstylish and made worse by dubbing". The review stated that Bava could "do better than this with less obvious material" and that he seemed "determined to spell everything out with a sudden zoom shots and shock cuts."

Reviewing the English-language version of the film, Time Out praised the film stating that "pictorially it's amazing, and even the script and dubbing are way above average." Time Out compared the film to anthology horror films made by the British production company Amicus noting that "If only Amicus...had taken heed they might have got some ideas as to what can be done with the format." Entertainment Weekly awarded the film an A− rating referring to it as "excellent" and that the stories were "composed of three tales of expertly building suspense" Kim Newman wrote in a retrospective review of the English dub, that "The Drop of Water" is the best of the three stories, and was described as "Bava's most simply frightening work." "The Telephone" was dismissed as being "less satisfying", stating that American International Pictures' attempt at re-writing the story caused the stories' problems. Newman declared that "The Wurdalak" was a "little masterpiece" praising Karloff's performance and that the themes of the story looked towards the themes in Night of the Living Dead and It's Alive.

In contemporary reviews of the Italian-language version, The Dissolve gave the film three and a half stars out of five, stating "There are small twists in all three stories, but for the most part, the segments suggest where they're headed early" and that the dialogue in the film is "sparse, and doesn't shy away from any exploitable elements, from scantily clad women to bloody wounds and warped-faced ghouls. But even more terrifying is the movie's atmosphere of doom [...] Black Sabbath is fraught with fatalism." Total Film awarded the film four stars out of five, referring to it as a "wonderful horror anthology". In the early 2010s, Time Out conducted a poll with several authors, directors, actors and critics who have worked within the horror genre to vote for their top horror films; Black Sabbath placed at number 73 on their top list.

== Influence and aftermath ==
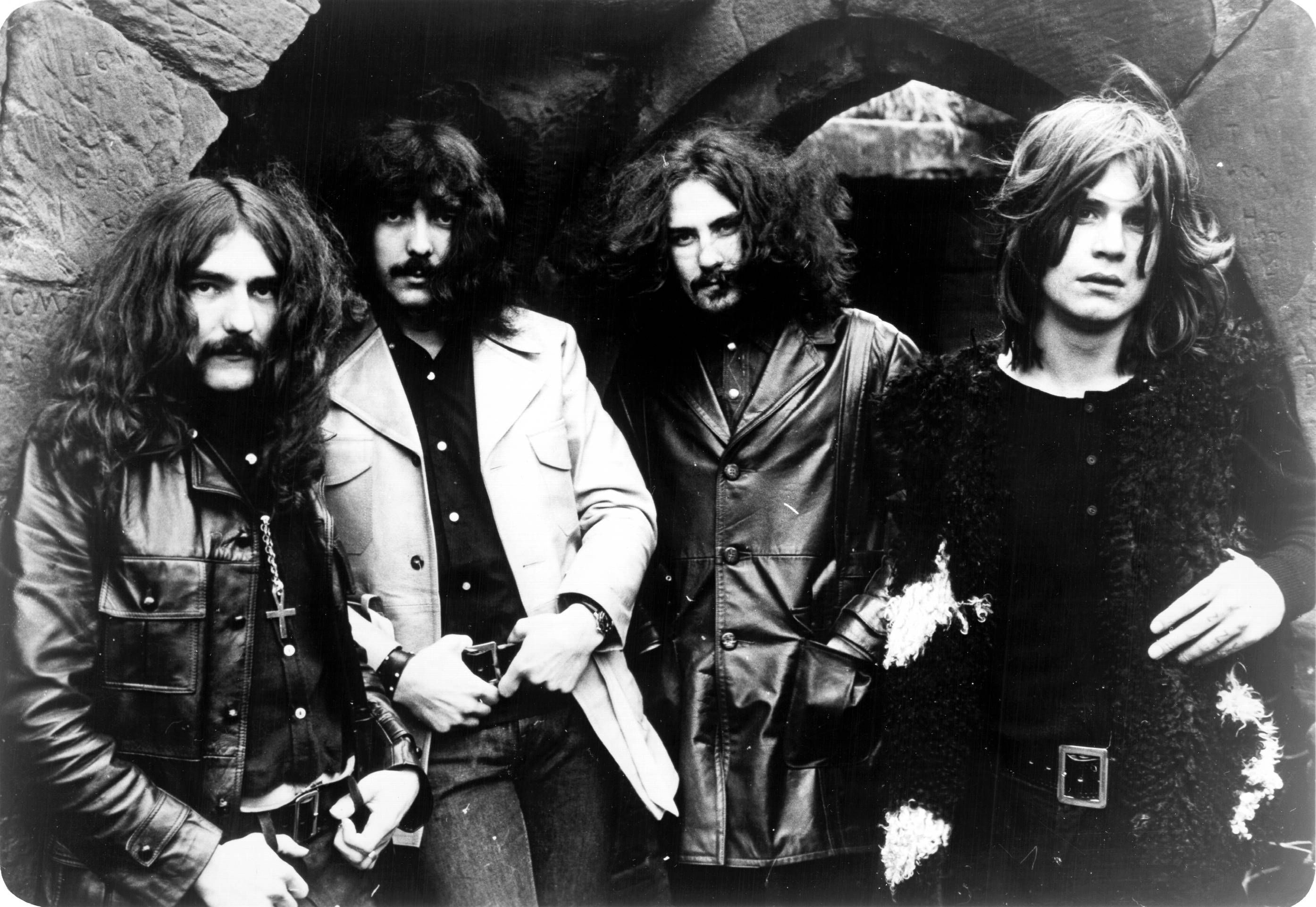
English metal band Black Sabbath (pictured) took their group's name from the film's English title.

Boris Karloff enjoyed working with Bava on Black Sabbath, and he praised his work to both Christopher Lee and Vincent Price who would later go on to work with Bava in The Whip and the Body and Dr. Goldfoot and the Girl Bombs respectively. Plans were made to reunite Bava with Karloff and Lee to work an adaptation of "The Dunwich Horror", provisionally titled Scarlet Friday. The project was later taken away from Bava after the critical and commercial failure of Dr. Goldfoot and the Girl Bombs, and was released as The Dunwich Horror directed by Daniel Haller; the film was made without Karloff and Lee's involvement.

The English heavy metal band Black Sabbath appropriated their name from the film. Originally known as Earth, the group wanted to change their name as another group had the same name. The group saw a local cinema playing Black Sabbath and marveled that people paid money to be frightened.

Directors Roger Avary and Quentin Tarantino were influenced by Black Sabbath's story structure for their original script for Pulp Fiction (1994). The film was originally going to contain three short films directed by Avary, Tarantino and another unknown director. Tarantino originally described this idea by stating that "what Mario Bava did with the horror film in Black Sabbath, I was gonna do with the crime film."

=== Unproduced remake ===
In 2004, Variety announced that Valhalla Motion Pictures and Kismet Entertainment Group were collaborating to produce a remake Black Sabbath. Jonathan Hensleigh was attached to contribute to the script development of the film. As of 2026, this film has not been produced.

== See also ==
- Boris Karloff filmography
- List of French films of 1963
- List of horror films of 1963
- List of Italian films of 1963
- Vampire film
