= Werewolf in Slavic mythology =

Mythological creature

Werewolf
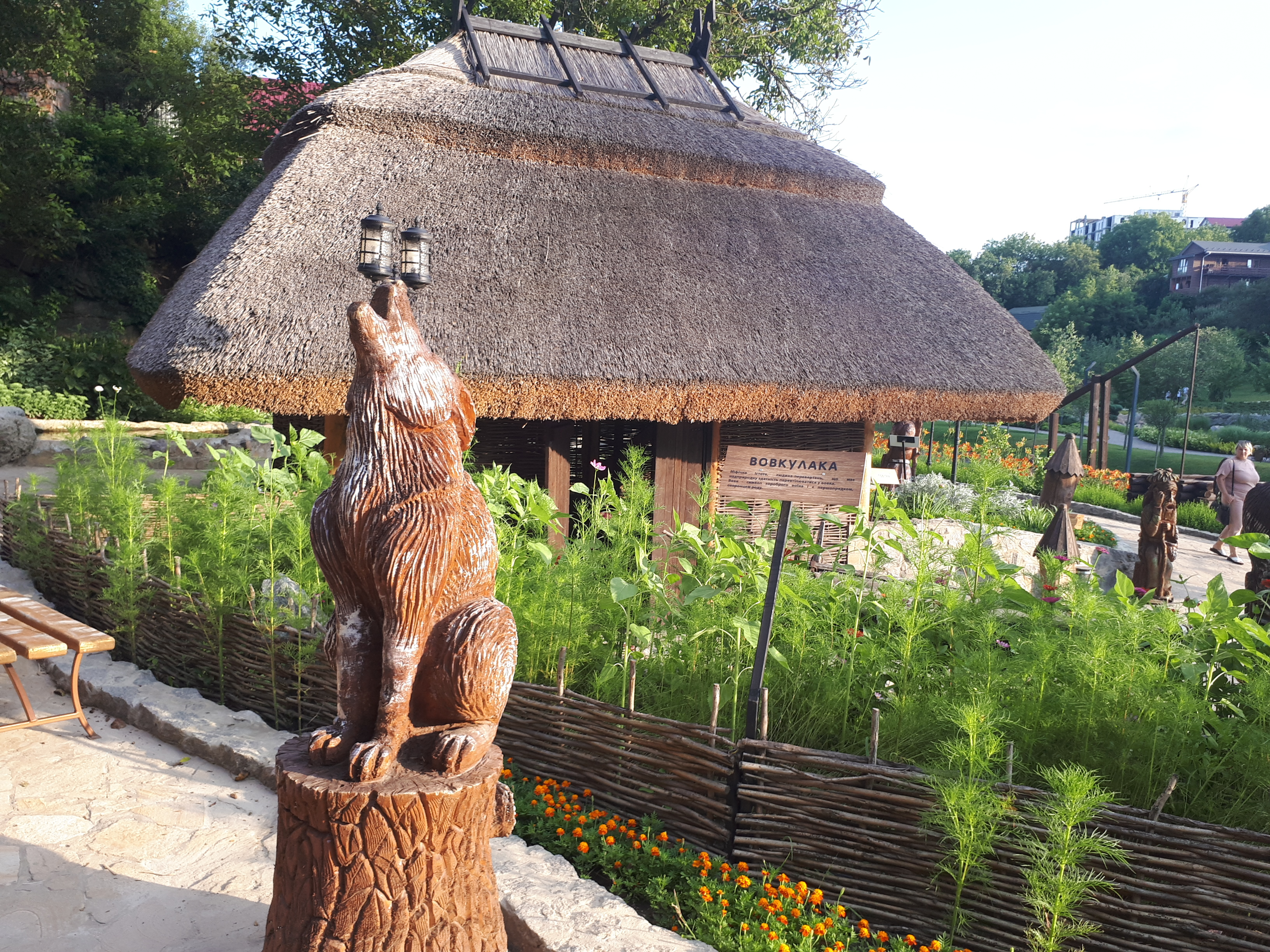
- Sculpture of a volkolak or werewolf. Exhibition "Ukrainian Homestead", Fantasy Park "New Sifyevka", Uman, Ukraine

Creature information
- Grouping: Wolf shapeshifter
- Similar entities: Shapeshifter, sorcerer, witch
- Folklore: Slavic mythology

Origin
- Habitat: Forest

In Slavic mythology, a werewolf (Note: Slavic names include: vǎlkolak, volkodlak, volkolak, vukodlak, vurdalak, etc.; Romanian Vârcolac; and Greek Vrykolakas (both borrowed from the Slavic term); see § Etymology for more) is a human-shapeshifter who temporarily takes the form of a wolf. Werewolves were often described as ordinary wolves, though some accounts noted peculiarities in appearance or behavior that hinted at their human origin. Werewolves retain human intelligence but cannot speak.

According to folk beliefs, transformation into a wolf is the most common form of shapeshifting among Slavs. The concept is ancient and appears to varying degrees among all Slavic peoples, with the most detailed accounts among Belarusians, Poles, and Ukrainians. In Russian folklore, the character is often simply called a shapeshifter, sharing clear similarities with the werewolf. South Slavic traditions sometimes conflate werewolves with vampires.

It was believed that sorcerers could transform into wolves by reciting spells and performing actions such as leaping, stepping over, tumbling through, or passing through magically imbued objects, or draping them over themselves. To revert to human form, sorcerers typically needed to repeat the actions in reverse. Sorcerers voluntarily became werewolves to cause harm to others.

Some beliefs described people born with a predisposition to periodic shapeshifting due to their parents' actions or as punishment for their own sins. Such werewolves were thought to exhibit zoomorphic traits in human form, such as hair resembling wolf fur. Transformations often occurred at night or during specific seasons. These werewolves were believed to lack control in wolf form, attacking livestock and even humans, including loved ones, and were sometimes associated with cannibalism. Ancient beliefs linked werewolves to celestial events like eclipses.

Folk beliefs also held that sorcerers or witches could transform a person into a wolf, often as an act of revenge, by casting spells on a wolf skin, belt, or enchanted door, among other methods. A popular narrative involved transforming an entire wedding party into wolves. The duration of the transformation ranged from days to years. Involuntary werewolves suffered fear and despair, longing for human life and avoiding true wolves. They were thought to avoid carrion and raw meat, subsisting on foraged food or stolen human provisions. Numerous methods were described to restore their human form.

Werewolf beliefs incorporated much of the wolf's symbolism in Slavic culture. The myth likely originated from ancient totemic beliefs and rites of youthful initiation. The werewolf image may have been influenced by observations of people with physical or mental disorders or of old and sick wolves. The concept has been reflected in Slavic literature.

== Historical and geographical context ==
The motif of humans transforming into wolves was present in the folk beliefs of all Slavic peoples, but it is best preserved among Ukrainians, Belarusians, and eastern Poles. Among Russians, the term volkolak is recorded only in southern regions, while elsewhere, those transforming into wolves were simply called shapeshifters, with beliefs closely resembling those about werewolves. In Slovak and especially Czech traditions, werewolf beliefs are scarce; among Sorbs, they are also diminished, primarily found in Lower Lusatia. South Slavic beliefs often conflate werewolves with vampires, with the exception of Slovenians, where these concepts nearly merge. Beyond folk beliefs, bylichkas, and byvalshchinas, werewolves also appear in a small number of fairy tales.

Regarding the antiquity of beliefs about human-to-wolf transformations in Slavic lands, the tribe of the Neuri, living in the 6th–5th centuries BCE somewhere in modern-day Ukraine and/or Belarus, is notable. According to Herodotus (c. 484–c. 430/425/420 BCE) in his Histories, members of this tribe transformed into wolves for a few days each year, likely in winter: (Note: Herodotus. Histories. Book IV, 105.)

These people [Neuri] seem to be sorcerers. At least, the Scythians and Greeks living among them claim that each Neuri annually turns into a wolf for a few days and then returns to human form.

This may refer to a ritualistic "transformation". Comparing the Neuri's "shapeshifting" with Slavic ritual masking supports, for some researchers, the hypothetical Slavic nature of the Neuri. However, it cannot be definitively stated whether these beliefs originated with the Neuri, the Scythians, or the Greeks, as such beliefs were not uncommon among the latter. The earliest evidence of beliefs about wolf transformations among Slavs likely comes from Italian and Byzantine chronicles mentioning the supernatural abilities of the Bulgarian prince Boyan the Mage (910–970): (Note: Liutprand of Cremona. Antapodosis. 3, XXIX.)

It is said that Boyan had so mastered magic that he once inadvertently turned into a wolf or a similar beast. (Latin original: Bajanum autem adeo foere magicam didisse, ut ex homine subito fieri lupum quamvecunque cerneres feram.)

In the Tale of Igor's Campaign (1185), the Polotsk prince Vseslav Bryachislavich (d. 1101) transforms into a wolf at night and runs to Tmutarakan in that form (though this may be metaphorical): (Note: Quote from the original is based on a photocopy of the 1800 edition of the poem. The capital letter reflects the early editors' belief that it refers to the city of Kursk.)

Leaping from them [Kievans] as a fierce beast at midnight from Belgorod, when a dark mist hung... he leapt as a wolf to Nemiga from Dudutki... Prince Vseslav judged people, distributed cities to princes, but at night roamed as a wolf; from Kiev he reached [the crowing of] roosters to Tmutarakan; as a wolf, he crossed the path of great Khors.

The wolf image, alongside other animal imagery, is also attributed in the poem to the bard Boyan and Prince Igor Svyatoslavich (1151–1201). In the Serbian (Ilovitsa) and Russian Kormchaya books of 1262 and 1282, respectively, volkodlaki are mentioned (the first recorded use of the term), chasing clouds and devouring the moon and sun. In Russian epics, Volga Svyatoslavich transforms into a wolf:

Volga, learned another wisdom, to turn into a grey wolf... It pleased Volga to gain much wisdom... to roam as a grey wolf across open fields.

In Serbian epics, the hero Vuk Grgurević transforms into a wolf (prototype: despot Vuk Branković, d. 1485). According to Vyacheslav Vsevolodovich Ivanov and Vladimir Nikolayevich Toporov, this may indicate the existence of a common Slavic mythological wolf-hero.

In the 15th–18th centuries, beliefs in werewolves in Polish lands were frequently mentioned in local and foreign historical chronicles and demonological works. Polish authors, within the prevailing European views, denied the possibility of real transformation, attributing it to illusory, devilish deception. One of the earliest recorded cases involves a Masurian peasant captured in a forest, with excessive body hair and numerous scars allegedly from dog bites, accused of attacking neighbors’ livestock in wolf form, which he gradually assumed around St. John the Baptist's Day and Christmas. He was imprisoned in the cellar of Prussian Duke Albert’s (1490–1568) castle, but the expected transformation did not occur; he was likely later burned alive. In the 17th–18th centuries, transformation into she-wolves was one of the accusations in Polish witch trials.

Most mythological stories and beliefs about werewolves, as with other figures of Slavic lower mythology, were recorded in the 19th–20th centuries. In the 20th century, traditional beliefs in shapeshifting waned, possibly due to the decline of traditional beliefs and the decreasing wolf population, though in some regions, tales of wolf transformations retain some popularity. In modern urban demonological beliefs, Slavic views on werewolves are being supplanted by the image of werewolves (lycanthropes) from Western popular culture.

== Etymology ==
The term "werewolf" in Slavic languages, derived from Proto-Slavic *vl̥ko-dlakъ (hypothetical, possibly from dialectal *vl̥ko-t/dlak(-ъ)), is reflected in various forms across Slavic languages. It appears in numerous forms across Slavic languages and dialects, reflecting both regional variation and historical linguistic influence. In East Slavic languages (Russian, Ukrainian, Belarusian), variants include волкола́к, вовкула́к, and ваўкала́к, with additional dialectal forms. South Slavic languages (Bulgarian, Serbian, Croatian, Slovenian, etc.) preserve older and richly varied forms like върколак, вуко́длак, and volkodlák, some influenced by or borrowed into Greek. West Slavic and related languages (Polish, Czech, Slovak, Sorbian) show both native and borrowed forms, with Polish wilkołak being especially prominent.

The first part of the term derives from Proto-Slavic vьl̥kъ ("wolf"), adapting to each language's phonology. The second part, per the classical hypothesis, corresponds to Old Church Slavonic длака, Serbo-Croatian дла̏ка, Slovenian dláka ("hair", "hide", "fur"), or "horse or cow hair", reconstructed as Proto-Slavic dolka or -dolkъ. The alternation дл / л in волкодлак—волколак and о / у in волколак—волкулак results from consonant cluster simplification and substitution of labialized correlates.

A widely accepted alternative hypothesis suggests the second element derives from Balto-Slavic dlak(i)as ("bear"), related to Prussian tlokis/clockis ( klokis), Lithuanian lokỹs, Latvian lâcis, Latgalian lōcś, Greek ἂρκτος, Hittite ḫartagga - ("bear-man"), etc. The second part is reconstructed as Proto-Slavic dlaka ("bear"), though some consider this erroneous. The term may share an origin with Lithuanian vilktakis and is semantically akin to Old Norse Ulf-biorn, Biǫrn-olfr, Old High German Wulf-bero, Bero-ulf, Visigothic Ber-ulfus. Shapeshifting into both wolves and bears is noted in the Old Russian Charovnik and Transcarpathian beliefs, with volkodlak possibly meaning "man with bear or wolf traits".

Some scholars combine both hypotheses, positing that the second component was an Indo-European term for bear, later surviving as a term for hide due to tabooing, or vice versa. Marina Valentsova questions this, noting rare combinations of wolf and bear shapeshifting in surviving beliefs. Alternative interpretations include "wolf with horse or cow hair, hide," "wolf pack, kin", or association with Thracian anthroponyms -ταλκης. The sound д in the second part may have emerged secondarily in South Slavic due to association with длаке ("hide"), appearing only in literary forms in West and East Slavic, leading to interpretations as suffixes -ol-ъ and -ak-ъ, Proto-Slavic lakъ ("clothing", "skin"), likъ ("face", "appearance", as vьlkolikъ, "wolf-like appearance"), lakati ("to lurk"), or lačiti ("to linger", "to follow").

Ukrainian Carpathian variants вовколаб, вовкурад, and вовкораб are euphemistic contaminations of вовкулак with лаба ("paw"), рад ("rejoicing", "loving"), and раб ("servant"). The Smolensk вукула derives from волколак under the influence of the name Vukol. In Sorbian wjelkoraz, the second part may come from образ ("image"), or Proto-Slavic raziti (cf. Upper Sorbian zarazyć, "to kill").

In Croatian dialectal (vu)kozlȁk, zlȁka is a local equivalent of dlaka. In Slavic, werewolves were also called by terms from the verb vedati ("to know"): Ukrainian віщун ("wolf-shapeshifter"), Old Czech vedi ("she-wolf shapeshifters"), Slovenian vedomci, vedunci, vedarci ("wolf-shapeshifters"), related to Old Norse vitnir and Hittite uetna, emphasizing sorcery as the cause of transformation.

== Origins ==
The wolf is one of the central, most mythologized, dangerous, and revered wild animals in Slavic folk tradition. It is likely that the Slavs once had a cult of the wolf. Key characteristics of the wolf's image include: living in the wild, predation, association with blood, chthonic nature, connection to darkness, ties to the dead, marital, masculine, and erotic symbolism, association with unclean forces (the wolf may be identified with them, suffer from them, or be dangerous to them), certain demonic properties, the presence of a "master" for wolves, a period of heightened wolf activity in winter coinciding with the activity of unclean forces, the wolf's mediating function between humans and gods or humans and evil spirits, the wolf as an "outsider", its association with boundary-crossing and transitional moments, its closest parallels being the bear on one hand and the dog on the other, and the use of wolf body parts and its name as magical means "to acquire repelling properties, aggression, vitality, and health". To varying degrees, these beliefs were transferred to the image of the werewolf.

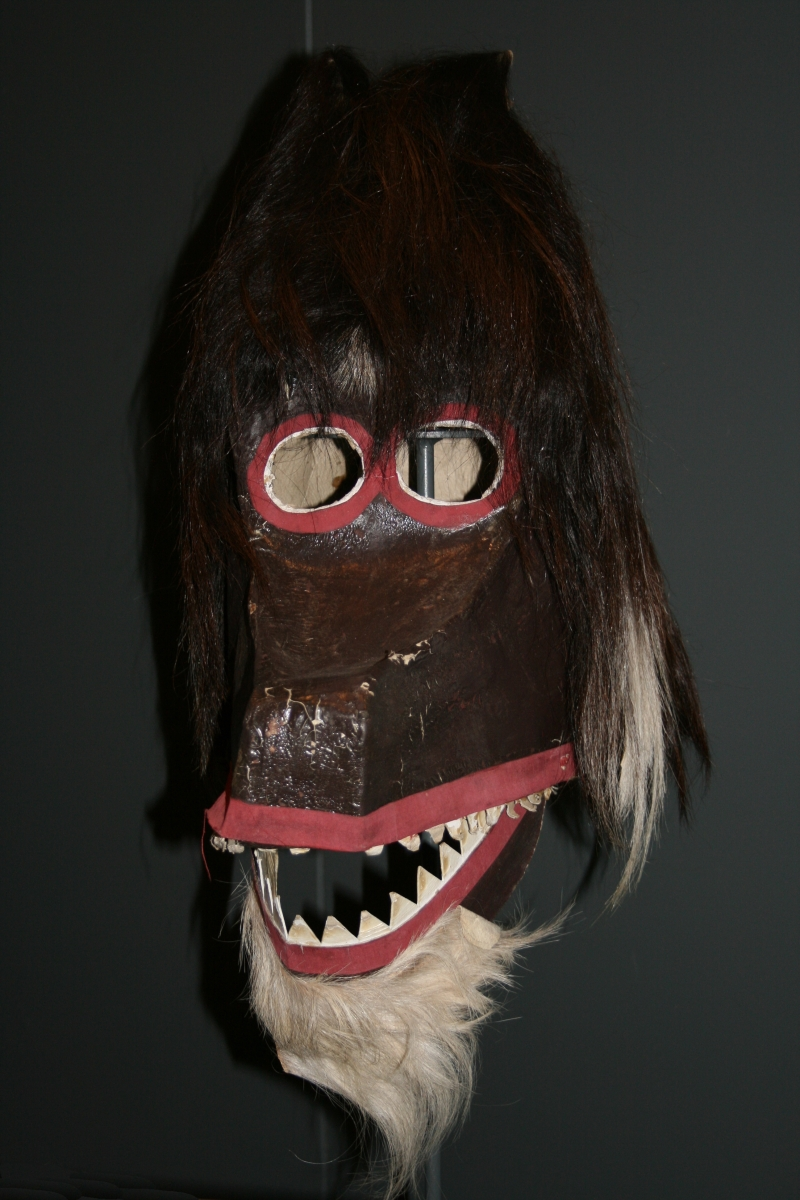
Wolf mask from Marčelji, used in the "zvončari" ritual. Ethnographic Museum in Zagreb

It is widely believed that the concept of werewolfism, as well as shapeshifting in general, originates from totemism, during which rituals involved dressing in the skins of totemic animals. Among the Slavs, it was common to dress up in wolf masks and costumes during New Year's celebrations, Maslenitsa, and other occasions, which can be seen as an imitation of shapeshifting. As pagan beliefs were dismantled and Christianity strengthened, attitudes toward wolves shifted from neutral to negative, and shapeshifting, once considered a sign of "an individual's connection to a divine or sacred animal", became viewed negatively and was seen as a "sign-symbol of an unclean force or its attributes". Consequently, it is suggested that voluntary transformation into wolves emerged earlier, while other types of shapeshifting developed under Christian influence. Given that, apart from transformations of entire weddings, stories of female werewolfism among the Slavs are very rare, it is inferred that werewolf beliefs are a folklorization of archaic male initiation rituals involving the use of psychoactive substances, which among ancient Slavs were supposedly accompanied by ritual rebirth as wolves, followed by "wolf" unions of young warriors who separated from society, lived in the forest, and engaged in banditry. Echoes of these phenomena are seen, for example, in Polish and Ukrainian initiation rituals into male communities in the 19th century and in Ukrainian beliefs about Zaporozhian Cossacks and noble bandits in the early 19th century. Werewolfism could also serve as a metaphor for military campaigns undertaken by young "wolf" warriors. It is also supposed that werewolf beliefs may trace back to Indo-European worship of a wolf-god—a god of warriors, the world of the dead, and fertility. Beliefs about wedding parties turning into wolves are linked by some researchers to totemism, as wedding groups once represented clan groups. In East Slavic folk tradition, almost all wedding participants could be called wolves. Other researchers connect these beliefs to an ancient form of marriage known as bride kidnapping.

However, there are skeptical views regarding these theories, denying a connection between ancient customs and beliefs and later werewolf concepts, which could have arisen independently. For example, a possible connection is noted between folk beliefs about shapeshifting and Christian literary sources: retellings of ancient accounts, moral narratives, demonological works, apocryphal tales, and echoes of German and French werewolf trials.

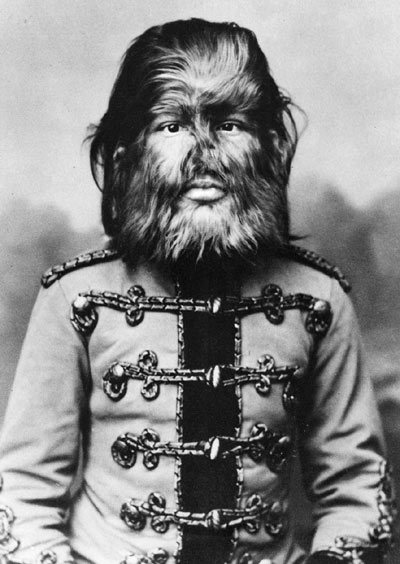
Fyodor Yevtikheyev (1864–1904), who suffered from hypertrichosis, was known as the "boy with the dog face"

The werewolf image served as a demonic personification of negative, anxiety-inducing, harmony-disrupting social phenomena. Researchers have explained the persistence of werewolf myths through mental disorders leading to animal-like behavior (e.g., clinical lycanthropy), the birth of children with atavistic traits (e.g., wolf's mouth, tails, excessive facial hair), or a generally "wild" appearance, among others. Rumors about werewolves could be deliberately spread by people stealing livestock, or by vagrants wandering villages, telling emotional stories about seeking relatives turned into wolves or having been wolves themselves, receiving alms from sympathetic villagers. Stories of finding a human body under a wolf's skin or a wolf transforming into a human after death may have stemmed from cases of hunters intentionally or accidentally killing people and attempting to avoid punishment. Beliefs about suffering, enchanted werewolves may have arisen from observing old, feeble wolves unable to hunt. Stories of unusual wolf behavior may also have been linked to cases of rabies. N. A. Krinichnaya notes that while many folktales mention specific, still-living individuals, usually from a neighboring settlement, when questioned, these individuals often confirm the story but claim it happened to others, again specific people from another village. B. Baranowski pointed out that the further a werewolf story was recorded from its supposed location, the more fantastical details it accumulated.

== Ways of transformation ==
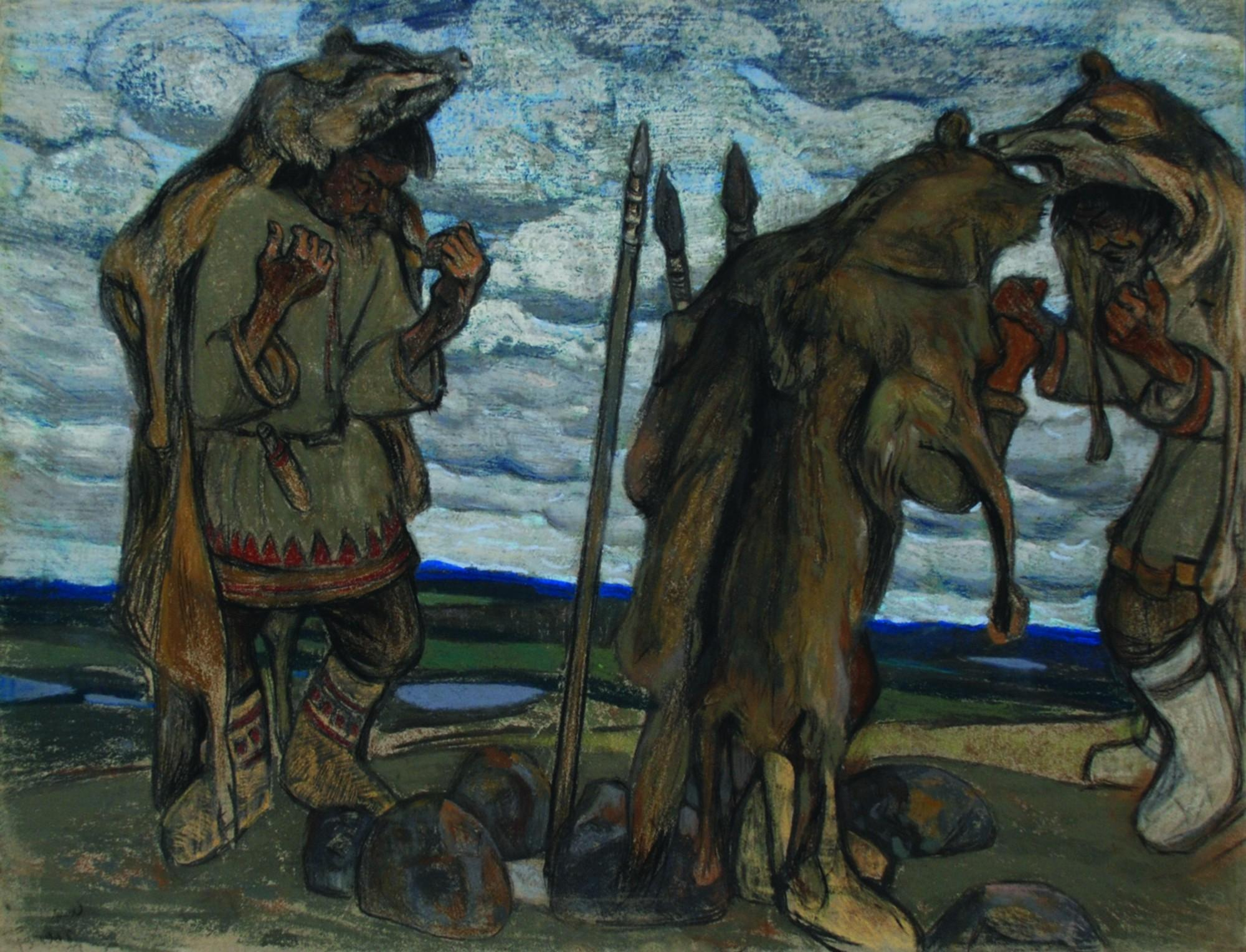
Nikolai Roerich. Sorcerers. 1905

Based on the nature of transformations, mythological werewolves can be divided into three main groups: those who transform deliberately through sorcery, those transformed against their will by others' spells, and those who transform spontaneously from time to time. Depending on the nature of the transformation, the methods also vary. Most of them symbolize integration into another, animalistic, chthonic world, crossing the boundary between worlds.

"There were two neighbors: the rich one was a sorcerer, and the poor one was a good man. The poor man bought a horse and took it to the pasture, but the rich one took three knives, stuck them into the ground, and began to roll over them. He rolled over the first knife — his head became wolf-like; he rolled over the second — his entire torso became wolf-like; he rolled over the third — his legs became wolf-like. Then he ran and killed the horse, but the poor man pulled out one knife. The wolf ran back to the knives to transform back into a human. He arrived. When he rolled over the first knife, his head became human again; when he rolled over the second knife, his torso became human; he rolled over the third time, but his legs remained wolf-like because the third knife was missing".

Belarusian legend Sorcerer-Werewolf

The ability of a sorcerer or witch to transform into a wolf is a specific case of their shape-shifting ability. In East Slavic and Polish traditions, this is a central motif in werewolf beliefs. Folklore describes several methods of voluntary human-to-wolf transformation: one must recite a secret incantation and then perform a specific action. It was often noted that one must tumble, jump, or step over (once or three times, according to various sources) objects such as knives or stakes driven into the ground point-up (symbolizing mortal danger), a stump, a threshold, or a table several times (five knives could symbolize the limbs and tail of a wolf), or an axe driven into the ground, or through a yoke (Vologda Governorate), a fireplace poker, a fence, a crossroads, an uncrossed aspen stump—either by grabbing it with teeth or placing a comb or splinter on it, a bent birch tree (Gomel Region), a log or bog iron (Belarusians), a ditch, a stream (Belarusians), a molehill (Slovenes), or a hoop. Other methods include: throwing a ring made of bast over oneself, tossing a basket over oneself (Smolensk Governorate), crawling through a horse collar (Ukrainians), or an old wheel without axles (Belarusians), stepping over a witch's belt placed under a threshold or road (Volyn Oblast), driving an enchanted axe into a stump, undressing completely or (among Ukrainians) changing into tattered clothes, running around seven trees seven times (Poles), wearing one of nine pelts supposedly shed by a wolf (Kashubians), crossing a midday land boundary (Sorbs), rolling in manure (Slovenes), or rubbing oneself with the sap of St. John's wort (Belarusians). In cases where repeated actions are required, the transformation could occur gradually. It was believed that to reverse the transformation, one had to perform the same actions in reverse: tumble over the mentioned objects, step over the belt, or pull the axe from the stump. However, if the object is stolen while the werewolf is in wolf form, they remain a wolf forever. Additionally, an inexperienced person attempting to transform in imitation of a sorcerer might fail to revert. According to some Polish beliefs, if a witch is killed in wolf form, her corpse will revert to human form.

"A young couple was on their way to their wedding, and as they passed by a miller, they did not dismount or bow to him. The miller said, 'Well, you will run and bow for a lifetime.' And at that moment, the entire entourage —bride, groom, groomsmen, and matchmakers— turned into wolves and ran off, never to become human again".

It was widely believed that a sorcerer or witch could transform a person into a werewolf, primarily out of revenge, against their will. They could recite an incantation and either cast a spell through the wind (Chernihiv Oblast), pour a decoction of linden bast under the victim's feet (Volyn Oblast), throw a wolf pelt over them, encircle them with a belt, cord, rope, or ribbon (the belt serving as both a mediator between worlds and a binding force), place a yoke around their neck (Ukrainians), strike the threshold three times with an axe to transform whoever passes through the door, give enchanted food or a potion (e.g., a decoction of twisted bast among Poles, or wine among Ural Cossacks), often affecting unintended targets, spit in their eyes (Ukrainians), force them through a horse collar by magic or trickery, tie the tops of two rowan trees over a road and slaughter three old non-crowing roosters so their blood drips onto passersby (Vitebsk Governorate), or strike them in the face with a stick. Common narratives include: a scorned woman transforming a man, a mother-in-law transforming an unloved son-in-law, a wife transforming her husband, a stepmother transforming a stepson, a daughter-in-law transforming a brother-in-law, a sorcerer transforming his son as punishment, or children accidentally drinking a potion meant for someone else (Smolensk Governorate). It was generally believed that a sorcerer could transform someone into a wolf for a specific period (1, 3, 6, 7, 9, 12, 25 days, weeks, months, or years), but not permanently. However, Ukrainians and Slovaks sometimes believed the curse becomes irreversible if the sorcerer dies. In Zakarpattia and Polesia, it was thought a sorcerer could not die (or dies painfully) until the werewolf is alive or disenchanted. Among Russians, there was a belief that a sorcerer transforming into a wolf during a new moon or Christmas could bite a person, turning them into a wolf for seven years; the victim could break the curse earlier by biting another person at the same time, transferring the wolf form. Additionally, according to Czech beliefs, Saint Nicholas could throw a wolf pelt over a person, turning them into a werewolf, or Saint George among South Slavs, and in Polesia, there were stories of transformations into werewolves by God.

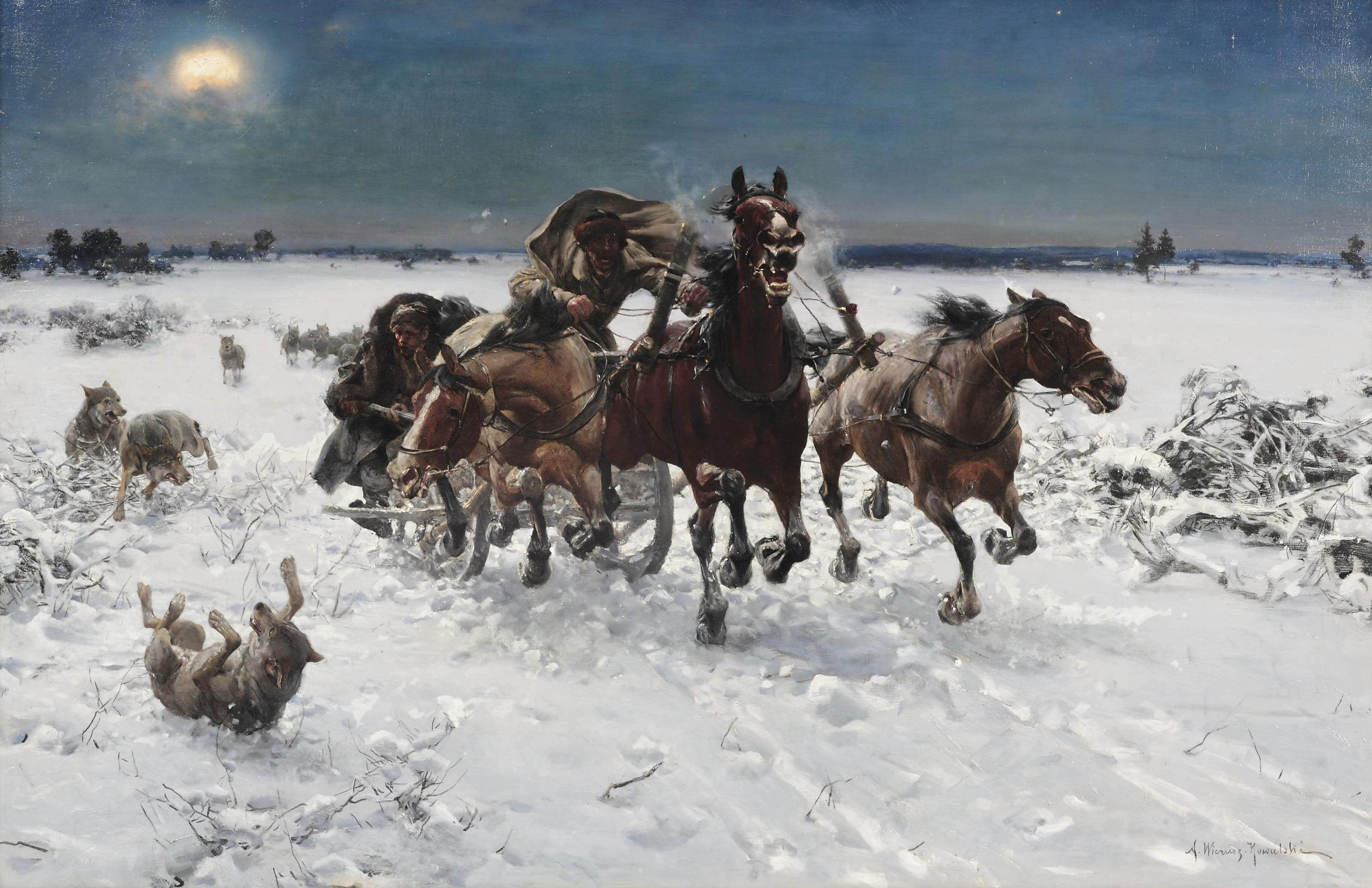
Alfred Wierusz-Kowalski. Trojka Chased by Wolves

Among Eastern Slavs and Poles, it was widely believed that a sorcerer or witch could transform an entire wedding party into werewolves. This is a specific case of a broader motif where a sorcerer or witch ruins a wedding if they oppose it or were not invited. To achieve this, they would recite an incantation and either encircle all guests with charmed belts, place such a belt (sometimes noted as made of bast) under the threshold for guests to step over, bury it at a crossroads where the wedding procession passes, dig a small ditch at the crossroads, throw a ball under the horses' hooves (Novgorod Governorate), or cross the wedding procession's path in wolf form (Volyn Oblast). Among Belarusians, they could also throw a pea from a pod containing as many peas as there are procession members or stretch a thread across the road. The transformed typically fled into the forest immediately. Such werewolves could be recognized by their festive attire, white and red rushnyks on the guests, rushnyks turned into white stripes on their fur, ribbons on the bride, a flower bouquet on the groom, or the enchanted bride and groom running together. In Grodno Governorate, Kharkov Governorate, and the Ural region, it was believed that to prevent the wedding party from turning into werewolves, the senior groomsman needed to know special counter-charms to respond to the witch's spells. In Arkhangelsk Governorate, it was believed the wedding procession should not depart without the sorcerer's "blessing".

Numerous methods were listed to break the curse before its term expired. A large group of reverse transformation methods involves contact with something from the human world. Others could help a werewolf regain human form by throwing a belt, torn clothing, a rake (Vitebsk Governorate), or a pitchfork (Belarusians) over them; stretching a thread across a road and letting the werewolf pass under it before breaking it (Vitebsk Governorate); inserting a knife into dough in a kneading trough; giving them bread to eat (Ukrainians and Slovenes) or a piece of wedding karavai (Belarusians); calling them by name (calling by name establishes a magical connection and returns them from the "other" world; if the name is unknown, one could try listing names); putting on the werewolf clothing removed from oneself (Arkhangelsk Governorate, Polesia, reversing the act of throwing a pelt) or a belt with knots tied while saying Lord have mercy; tearing one's clothing and throwing it after them; for enchanted wedding members, playing a wedding song on a violin (Belarusians). A separate subgroup involves Christian elements: performing a Christian ritual—crossing, praying, bringing to church, holding a prayer service, or marrying; covering with a belt or priest's vestment; covering with a tablecloth used to bless Easter food; giving blessed food (Novgorod Oblast, Slovenia); the werewolf hearing Easter bells; or disenchantment by Saint Nicholas (Poles). A Ukrainian description details a complex ritual: spread a rushnyk, insert a knife in front of it, place an icon and bread on the rushnyk, light a candle, and say: "We invite you to bread and salt and the holy icon. May the Lord turn you back and purify your body with holy prayers". A tale from Pskov Oblast describes disenchanting werewolves by luring them with a magical flute and fumigating them with a piece of a sorceress-priestess's shroud. Another group of methods involves removing the wolf pelt: shaking the werewolf out of it (Ukrainians); tying werewolves’ tails together and scaring them to run apart, leaving the pelts behind; tearing the pelt removed temporarily by the werewolf (Slovenes). Related stories involve turning a werewolf back by striking them or with a pitchfork between the eyes (Volyn Oblast) (as transformation, including reversal, is a form of death), or with a stick on the mouth (Smolensk Governorate), head, or back; sometimes this happens accidentally, e.g., people beat the werewolf to drive it away, or it is bitten by dogs or wolves, gored by a bull, or caught on a fence stake or tree. Other methods include: bathing in running water; passing between the legs of the one who cursed them (Ukrainians); throwing manure at the werewolf (Brest Region; manure, a fertility source, was used to repel evil forces); disenchanting with a charm; cutting an enchanted belt, with the curse lifting if it bursts on its own; or driving two aspen stakes into the corners of a house (Belarusians). The main difficulty in helping a werewolf regain their form was recognizing them among other wolves. However, Belarusians believed that if a woman helps a werewolf revert, she risks becoming a werewolf herself. In some stories, the one who cast the curse lifts it, either by performing a magical act or indicating what to do; some believed only they could do so. However, in some places, it was believed the curse could not be lifted before its term. A common motif is that during reversion, the werewolf's pelt or enchanted belt bursts.

Amulets against transformation into a werewolf were almost unknown. Ukrainians believed a sorcerer could not turn someone into a werewolf if their true name was hidden. In Kyiv Governorate, people prayed to Saint Vukol (Vakula) to protect against transformations. Ukrainians also believed that someone who had been a werewolf could not become one again.

Additionally, there were beliefs that some people had innate or acquired abilities for periodic shape-shifting. This type of transformation is common in Polish, Balkan, Ukrainian Carpathians, and to a lesser extent, Polesia beliefs. It is rare in Russian and Belarusian traditions. Werewolves could include children whose parents violated certain taboos: those born to a woman who saw a wolf during pregnancy, especially after moonset (Ukrainians and Slovenes), or ate meat from an animal killed by a wolf (Ukrainians); those whose parents worked on a holiday; children conceived on a forbidden day (a church holiday or during a fast), such as Easter (Volyn Oblast, Boikivshchyna), on Sunday, at midnight, or in an "evil" moment. This type of belief reflects the motif of redemption borne by the next generation for the sins of the previous one. Birth during certain periods also doomed one to wolf transformations, such as during Christmas (Northern Bulgaria) or under a specific planet (Pokuttia). Werewolves could include children born to a woman impregnated by a wolf (Zhytomyr Oblast, Boikivshchyna, Slovenia) or a vampire (Slovakia), double-souled beings (with two souls and sometimes hearts; Poland and Ukrainian Carpathians), children cursed by parents, those whose godparents thought of werewolves during baptism, or the seventh son of a seventh son of the same gender in a family. Ukrainians and Slovenes believed werewolves are born feet first, Ukrainians also believed with natal teeth, and Slovenes believed "in a caul". However, Slovenes believed such a child could avoid becoming a werewolf if properly turned at birth or if a piece of the caul was sewn to their shoulder. Werewolves could also include those transformed after death, unbaptized or improperly baptized infants, suicides, those committing specific sins (e.g., in the Chronicles of the Poznań Benedictines from 1609, a Lutheran merchant named Ridt, living near the new Benedictine convent in Poznań, compared the nuns’ daily singing to wolf howling, died suddenly, turned into a wolf on the day of his death, and repented his sin, doomed to roam the forests as a wolf until the Last Judgment), criminals (Gomel Region, Poland), and sorcerers and witches. A Czech source preserves a legend about the Polish Łaski family from near Łęczyca: as a curse for one of their ancestors killing Saint Stanisław (1030–1079) by order of King Bolesław II the Bold, each year one family member had to turn into a wolf and live in the forest for a year. Notably, Zygmunt Łaski, a young knight under King John III Sobieski, who fought in the Battle of Vienna in 1683 and promised to return to Regina Gerstenkorn, daughter of the burggrave of Černá Hora castle, Christian Gerstenkorn, whom he intended to marry while hoping to overcome the family curse, allegedly turned into a wolf and was killed on May 7, 1684 (the anniversary of Saint Stanisław's murder) by a local forester named Stanisław. Before dying, he confessed his story to a priest administering Eucharist (likely a real hunting accident embellished with fantastical details or a retelling of the Irish legend of the Werewolves of Ossory). In Poznań, it was said that to identify a werewolf, one should circle the suspected person three times with bread in the mouth, causing the werewolf to begin transforming. In Polish Pomerania, it was believed that cutting off the tail could end regular transformations.

== Appearance ==
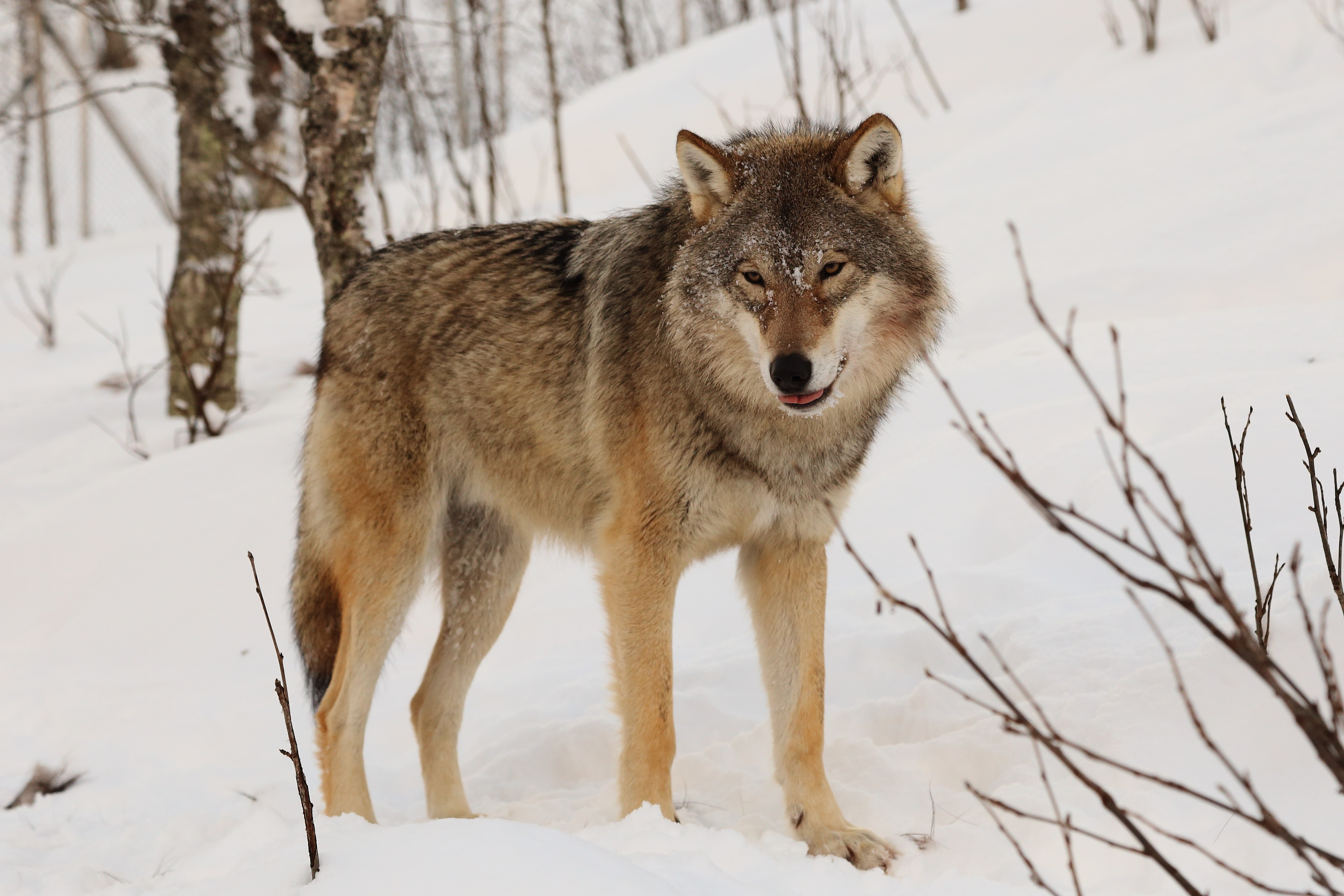
Eurasian wolf, a subspecies of wolf common in Slavic countries

During transformation, a werewolf's hands become covered in fur and turn into paws, causing them to stand on all fours. With very rare exceptions, they can no longer speak human language, only howl. However, details of the transformation are rarely specified.

Werewolves are primarily described as entirely ordinary wolves, However, some accounts note certain peculiarities in their appearance and behavior. According to some beliefs, werewolves retain some human traits. For example, in Kaluga Governorate, it was believed that the joints of a werewolf's hind legs are turned forward like a human's, rather than backward like a wolf's. In Gomel Region, they were said to cast a human shadow. In Smolensk Governorate, they had a human reflection. In Polesie, they emitted a human scent. Belarusians noted human eyes. In Cherkasy Oblast, they left human footprints from their hind paws. Among the Lusatians, a folktale describes werewolves whistling by placing a front paw in their mouth. In Brest Region, it was said they could cross their paws on their chest. In Zakarpattia, they could snatch a hunter's rifle with their teeth. On the Russian North, it was believed that in areas without fur, a werewolf's clothing or scraps of it were visible. When hunters killed a werewolf, they found a human and/or clothing, jewelry, or money beneath its hide. In a folktale from Grodno Governorate, they even found a violin belonging to an enchanted musician. In Vitebsk Governorate, it was said that a wounded werewolf might cry out "ah", and wolves would gather and howl over its corpse for a long time. From this, as well as motifs of draping a wolf's hide over a person to turn them into a wolf and its cracking or tearing during reverse transformation, it can be inferred that the wolf's hide was considered an external shell imprisoning the werewolf, concealing and binding its human essence. In the appearance of werewolves, new traits could emerge that were characteristic neither of wolves nor humans. For example, Kashubians believed a werewolf's eyes looked like glowing coals. Belarusians and Poles claimed werewolves had a large head with two additional eyes on the back, allowing them to see in all directions. Poles, Belarusians, and Hutsuls believed werewolves were larger, stronger, and more invulnerable than ordinary wolves (for example, some believed they were immune to unconsecrated bullets).

A distinguishing feature of congenital werewolves in human form was various zoomorphic traits. Among Poles and South Slavs, hair resembling wolf fur was noted. Among West Slavs, conjoined eyebrows (the so-called "wolf's eye" among South Slavs) and the presence of a tail were observed. Slovenes noted "wolf-like" teeth. Poles observed a fierce gaze, pale face, excessive facial hair, and protruding vertebrae. A small hole in the skin under the armpit allowed the skin to be turned inside out, revealing the wolf's hide. In Zakarpattia, it was believed that a "vovkun" (werewolf) attacked human livestock even after death, and only two twin oxen could move the coffin containing its body.

When an enchanted werewolf returns to human form, they are, according to various beliefs, naked (because their clothes rotted away), covered in fur (Smolensk Governorate), with calloused (Polesie) or blistered (Poland) hands from walking on all fours, mute (among Ukrainians), unsociable, or "wild". They return to a normal human state by wearing new clothes, eating human food, hearing a church bell (among Ukrainians), or bathing in a bathhouse (Smolensk Governorate). Some beliefs held that former werewolves permanently retained, especially if the transformation process was disrupted, fur on parts of the body, even under the tongue, wolf paws, a tail, a mouth, eyes, or fangs, large conjoined eyebrows, red eyes (Grodno Governorate), wolf-like curved palms or feet, or a wild gaze. Wounds received in wolf form remained after returning to human form. In one Ukrainian folktale, a werewolf who returned to human form appeared much older than expected, as each week in wolf form counted as a year.

Among Poles, Lusatians, Slovenes, and in Rivne Oblast, there is occasionally a belief in werewolves as half-human, half-wolf beings (cf. Bugul Noz, Lougarou), with a wolf-like upper body or only head. According to a Polish legend, Jesus deprived these beings of bipedalism as punishment for attempting to eat a human.

In the Old Russian forbidden book Charovnik, it is stated that the ability to transform into a wolf is necessary for transforming into a bear. In Zakarpattia, it was believed that a werewolf transforms into a wolf for one month and a bear for the next. N. A. Krinichnaya suggests that this duality is due to the fact that, in a tribal system, the bear clan could belong to the phratry of the wolf. According to South Russian and Ukrainian beliefs, werewolves, besides wolves, typically transform into black dogs and cats. In folk beliefs, a dog is somewhat equated with a wolf but also opposed to it; for example, in folk tales, the dog's form is paired with the wolf's in contests between a shape-shifting hero and their antagonist.

== Lifestyle ==
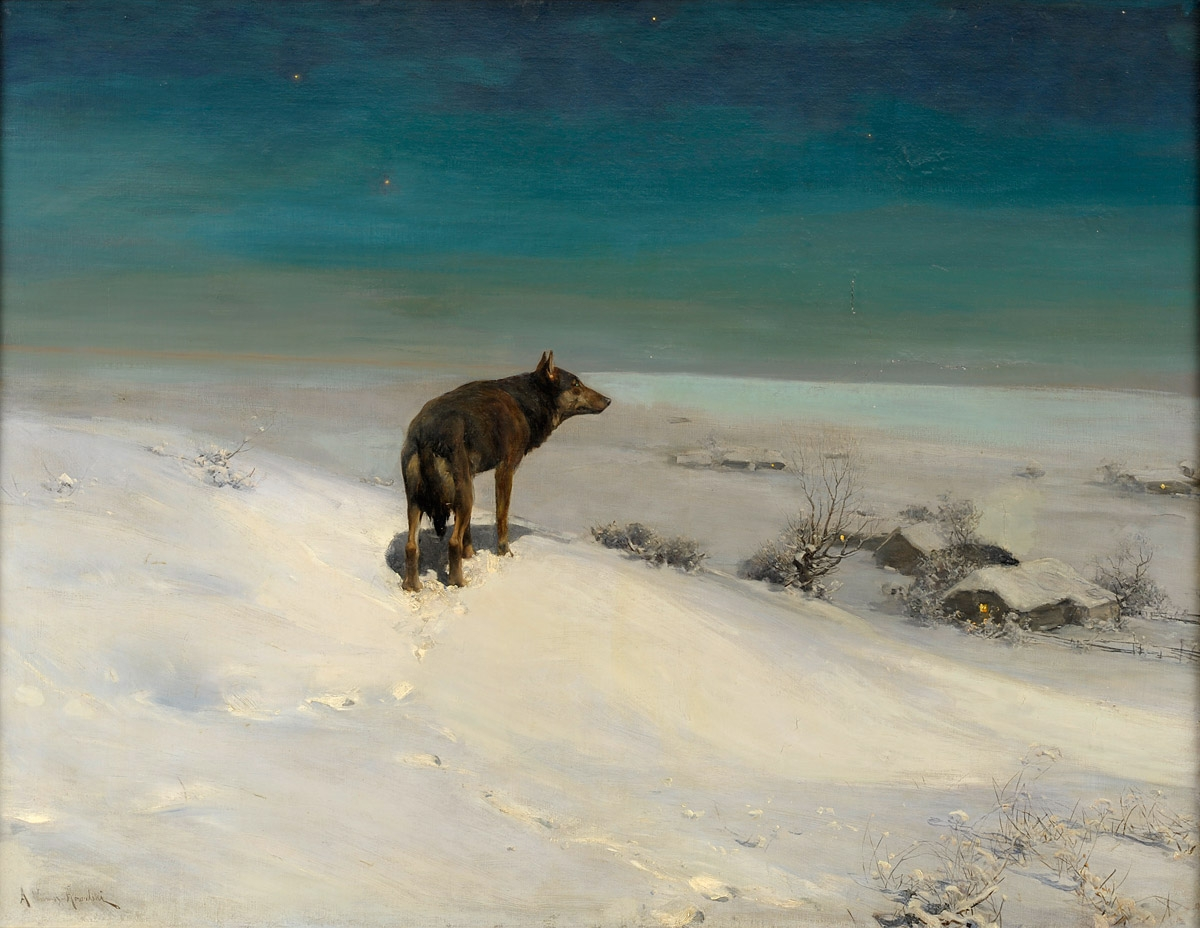
Alfred Wierusz-Kowalski. Lone Wolf. 1913

Beliefs about the behavior of werewolves vary. In most cases, it was believed that they retained human intelligence, but there are stories in which a former werewolf remembers nothing of what happened in wolf form, as if they were unconscious.

Sorcerers and witches typically transformed into wolves at night and returned to human form in the morning. The purpose of their transformation into wolves is not always specified by the storyteller, often simply stated that they "run as wolves", but when a purpose is mentioned, it usually involves attacking livestock, intimidating, or killing people, (sometimes even those who sleep at home). Additionally, "knowledgeable" people transformed into animals to move across terrain more quickly. A mother in wolf form might prevent her son from attending a party. Among Ukrainians, there were beliefs that Zaporozhian Cossacks could transform into wolves, especially character actors, such as Ivan Sirko (c. 1610–1680), and other chieftains.

Those born as werewolves transform into wolves at specific times of the day, often at night, and/or during certain times of the year. Ukrainians believed that a werewolf is a wolf for one month and a human for another, or that they transform into a wolf on Saint George's Day (May 6 or April 23 in the Julian calendar), and back into a human on Saint Nicholas Day (December 19 or December 6). Alternatively, the reverse transformation occurs on Easter or Christmas Eve (January 6 or December 24). Poles believed transformations occurred on specific holidays: Saint Nicholas Day (December 6), Saint Lucy's Day (December 13), Christmas (December 25), Epiphany (January 6), Easter, Corpus Christi, Nativity of Saint John the Baptist (June 24), and Our Lady of the Herbs (July 2). In some regions (Ukrainian Carpathians, Slovakia, and to a lesser extent Polesia), transformations were linked to lunar phases (full moon, new moon, or waxing/waning moon). It was generally believed that such werewolves, unable to control their behavior, hunted livestock and people. They might even attack their loved ones. Tales were widespread about a werewolf husband unsuccessfully attacking his wife, who later recognizes him by a piece of her dress stuck in his teeth. Among the Gorals in Slovakia, a fairy tale was recorded about a werewolf father who eats all his daughters except one, who escapes through cunning and later marries a king. Ukrainians believed that werewolves, when in human form, do not attend church, observe customs, or greet others. According to Ukrainian and Slovak beliefs, they have sexual relations with witches, resulting in vampires. Among Eastern Slavs, it was believed that such werewolves become vampires after death, so their mouths were sealed with a coin.

In various regions, it was believed that werewolves became active during the Twelve Days of Christmas, and on Kupala Night. They mingled with other revelers and freely entered any home. In Vologda Governorate, it was said that during Christmas games, they posed difficult questions to girls, though the consequences for not answering were not specified. In Smolensk Governorate, stories described werewolves in human form attending a party and killing girls. Werewolves could also attack girls performing Christmas divinations. Poles believed werewolves could rape women. In Transcarpathia, it was said that werewolves roamed villages at night, howling terrifyingly, peering into windows, and banging on doors. According to some beliefs, werewolves ate human flesh and drank human blood. In Polesia, there was a belief that they undressed a person before eating them. Polish folk etymology interpreted the word "wilkołak" as "a wolf craving (łaknący) human blood" and derived werewolves from those cursed by Jesus for loving only meat, eventually craving human flesh. Retaining human intelligence in wolf form, they could pick locks, lead wolf packs, and devise complex plans to attack people. Ukrainians believed werewolves could cause epidemics. In Lublin Voivodeship, it was thought that werewolves dug up freshly buried corpses.

"Werewolves" feed exclusively on plant-based food. Wandering through forests and roads, they carefully collect edible scraps and crumbs discarded by people, not shying away from the bones of edible animals.<...> Only on days of breaking the fast do "werewolves" eat meat obtained through predation, but not in their native or nearby village, only in distant places.<...>

The lifestyle of "werewolves" differs from that of ordinary wolves. Thus, "werewolves" howl toward the east or their villages when they go to sleep or wake up—this is their prayer; in the morning, they wash by rubbing their muzzles on dewy grass, following habit, and in early spring, they dig the earth with their paws—plowing".

Those forcibly transformed into wolves, according to some beliefs, suffer from fear and despair, miss human life, and wish to become human again. They do not attack livestock or people, only targeting the one who curse them. They cannot return to human settlements, so they live in dens, roam forests, howl like wolves, but retain their human essence, human intelligence, and the ability to understand human speech. They stay close to settlements and their homes, (Masurians believed only a werewolf could enter a settlement during the day), look at people pitifully, and even cry, seeking help, though attempts to contact humans usually fail. A common motif involves a werewolf asking a human for help after getting a thorn in its paw. According to other beliefs, werewolves only kill livestock but do not eat it, or they are forced to serve wolves, attacking livestock on their orders and giving them the spoils. It was believed that a werewolf cannot eat carrion and/or raw meat, attempting to cook the latter over the embers of recently extinguished fires. Such a werewolf eats roots, wild berries, steals food from shepherds, and from cellars, consumes barely edible items like harnesses, shoe soles (Vitebsk Governorate), or rotten stumps (Gomel Region), or only licks trees or sticks touched by humans. Sometimes people, especially relatives, feed them. In some areas, such as the Russian North, it was believed that eating raw meat would make a werewolf remain a beast forever.

However, other beliefs held that werewolves, though reluctantly, had to adapt to eating raw meat. It was often thought that werewolves are always solitary, not associating with real wolves, as wolves mock them or might attack them if they detect a human scent. In Vitebsk Governorate, it was believed that werewolves wash with dew by rubbing their muzzles on grass, dig the earth in spring like peasants, make pillows from branches and stones, and howl-pray toward the east or their village. There are stories where a werewolf integrates with wolves, is accepted into their pack, and hunts with them, sometimes even leading it. In Polesia, it was believed that a werewolf could understand wolf speech immediately after transformation and communicate with wolves, while Ural Cossacks thought this ability came after eating raw meat. Wolves could teach an inexperienced werewolf forest life; in one Ukrainian legend, Saint George orders them to do so. Ukrainians considered Saint George the patron of both real wolves and werewolves. In a Western Polesia tale, a former werewolf helps a wolf pack avoid a planned hunt. Belarusians believed that if a pregnant woman became a werewolf, she would still give birth to a human child, but if she became pregnant in wolf form, the child would be a werewolf who, after the mother's curse ends, would become human but with a bad character. In Brest Region, it was thought that such a she-wolf comes to people to give birth, lying on a porch and asking to be let in through a window, hiding under a stove or bench. Stories also told of a woman turned into a wolf who returned home to nurse her child. According to South Slavic beliefs, an enchanted werewolf becomes a wolf only at night, shedding its wolf skin during the day. Hutsuls believed a sorcerer could control enchanted werewolves. There are rare tales where a werewolf behaves entirely like a wolf. Overall, werewolves exist between human and animal worlds, belonging to neither. In some cases, even regaining human form brought no relief, as loved ones might have died or friends forgotten them. In some Polish stories, a former werewolf, realizing their irrelevance to humans, becomes a wolf again. Psychological changes could occur, such as a desire to eat their child, dementia, reclusiveness, anger, and hostility. Some stories describe a werewolf, regaining human form, taking revenge on their enchanter with the help of a "knowledgeable" person, turning them into a beast.

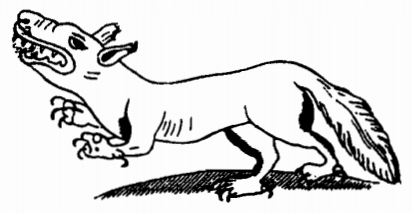
Wolf. Drawing from the 18th-century illustrated manuscript of Damaskinos Stouditis's Collection on the Properties of Animals

People's attitudes toward werewolves varied depending on whether their transformation was voluntary. Sorcerer werewolves were viewed negatively, feared, and people sought to protect themselves and punish them for witchcraft. It was believed that werewolves feared the cross, and in some Polish regions, pitchforks. In Smolensk and Voronezh Governorate, people prayed to Saint Bucolus for protection. Poles and Ukrainians believed that Saint Nicholas or Saint George allowed werewolves to attack only evil, dishonest people, or sinners. To prevent a werewolf attack at night, it was advised to sleep with an unbuttoned shirt collar, cross the pillow, place a religious book nearby, cross the bed three times, and pray. Women were to sleep in a head covering (cap or headscarf). In Volhynia, during Apple Feast, upon hearing a wolf's howl while going to church, it was believed to be a werewolf; to protect their household, people sprinkled consecrated poppy seeds underfoot and said: "Pooh, pooh, Mother of God, restore human form to the one who cries out and seeks your help". There are known cases of mob justice against suspected werewolves and rare instances of trials against alleged werewolves. Enchanted werewolves were met with sympathy, and people tried to help them regain human form. Innate lycanthropy often absolved werewolves of responsibility for their actions in the eyes of the people. E. Wilczyńska, based on Polish material, concludes that the fewer wolves in a region, and thus the less harm they caused to households, the better the attitude toward werewolves.

Slavs considered werewolves responsible for eclipses. Werewolves that devour the moon and sun and put away clouds are mentioned in the Nomocanons: the Serbian (Ilovitsa) of 1262 and the Russian of 1282: "Those chasing clouds from settlements are called werewolves; when the moon or sun perishes, they say: werewolves ate the moon or sun". Similar references exist in Old Czech sources. Echoes of this may persist in Slovenian ("sonce jedeno") and Russian ("the grey wolf catches stars in the sky") expressions. Similar beliefs about werewolves devouring celestial bodies persisted in the Balkans and the Ukrainian Carpathians into the 20th century, though under this name, among South Slavs and Romanians, it referred to a serpent-like creature, or sometimes just a wolf among the latter. When devouring, the injured celestial bodies redden as if bleeding. Among Hutsuls, a legend held that werewolves eat the moon because it bears the images of two brothers, one of whom killed the other over a land dispute, from whom werewolves descend. Slovenes believed eclipses occur when two werewolves fight each other. However, werewolves devour celestial bodies slowly, allowing them to recover. In Northwest Bulgaria, it was believed that only a hole remains of the moon. To drive away the demon and allow the celestial bodies to recover, people had to make loud noises. Parallels to the motif of a wolf devouring the sun can be found in Germanic mythology.

== Werewolf and vampire ==
South Slavic beliefs connect the werewolf with the vampire (upyr), that is, a walking corpse that kills people (in some regions, drinks their blood or crushes the sleeping), or harms them, their livestock, and property. In Bosnia and Herzegovina and Croatia, terms derived from "volkodlak" (werewolf) are the dominant names for such a character, while in Slovenia, eastern Bosnia, and eastern Herzegovina, derivatives of both "volkodlak" and "vampire" are used equally often (though in some regions, derivatives of "vampire" refer to the devil). However, in some areas, the meaning of "wolf-shapeshifter" for derivatives of "volkodlak" persists. It is generally considered that this blending of images is secondary, although A. A. Potebnja once attempted to prove the original conflation of the images of wolf, vampire, and serpent among Slavs. In non-Slavic Balkan languages, the word volkodlak was also borrowed, primarily in the sense of a vampire. However, in modern Balkan languages, it is consistently used to translate Western names for wolf-shapeshifters.

In Slovenian mythology, the word volkodlak refers to a being that can shift between human and wolf forms, described both as a demon and as a human with supernatural abilities, acquired, for example, through a mother's curse or insult or enchanted at a wedding. In the latter case, reverting to human form is difficult. These beings live in caves and pits. From sexual relations between volkodlaks and women, offspring may appear normal or be hairy, tailed, and with wolf-like teeth. According to some sources, transformation into a wolf occurs at night, during which the volkodlak may attack and devour people.

In Bulgarian mythology, the word върколак describes both a vampire and a human shapeshifter, transforming into a wolf at night or during specific times of the year. Those who incurred the wrath and vengeance of a sorcerer or witch could become it: at night, an evil spirit with a wolf skin would appear and order them to wear it; afterward, they roamed as wolves at night, reverting to human form at dawn by shedding the wolf skin. Bulgarians have legends about transformations into върколаци at weddings and about discovering a human under the skin of a killed wolf. They may also envision the vampire itself, among other forms, as a wolf. A vampire could arise from someone whose mother ate meat from animals killed by wolves during pregnancy or whose burial clothes were sewn during the "wolf days". Additionally, there are beliefs that the blood of a murdered person could turn into an evil spirit върколак that visits its native home.

In Macedonian beliefs, "volkolak" means "vampire on the fortieth day", or "dead but alive, similar to an ordinary person". Macedonians believed that a volkolak could engage in sexual relations with their living spouse and conceive a child: "From a volkolak, a son, volkolache". A. A. Plotnikova notes that this term is typical, particularly for the village of Peštani, as the center of the most remote southwestern part of the Macedonian ethnic region, and is characterized by cultural parallels in Albanian mythology, as well as along the coast of the Adriatic Sea (southern Herzegovina, Dalmatia), in Bosnia, and Croatia.

In Serbo-Croatian, the word vukodlak describes a vampire that typically does not resemble a wolf. However, its image includes some core werewolf traits. In Serbian mythology, it can transform into a wolf (in the Kuči tribe, it was believed all vampires could do so) or exhibit wolf-like features, such as being covered in fur or having disheveled, upright hair resembling wolf fur. There are tales of a husband transforming into a wolf and unsuccessfully attacking his wife, who later identifies him by pieces of her dress in his teeth. Additionally, vukodlaks are particularly active during winter months when rituals related to wolves were performed. In Bosnia and Croatian mythology, the vukodlak is also understood as a wolf-like mythical creature with vampire functions. In Montenegro, Boka, Herzegovina, and Dalmatia, a vampire was simply called vuk (wolf).

The connection between werewolves and vampires is also evident among Western Slavs. For example, Slovaks could refer to a vlkolak, beyond its primary meaning, as the harmful souls of witches, sorcerers, or the deceased carried out of the house head first. The influence of Balkan traditions on the werewolf image (bloodthirstiness, devouring people) is also felt in some areas of the Ukrainian Carpathians.

== Related characters ==
Slavic shape-shifting is primarily associated with the wolf, but there are also beliefs about humans turning into other animals, though these are less vividly and elaborately described than werewolf legends. Human transformation into a wolf is the primary form of shape-shifting among other Indo-Europeans, and beliefs in shapeshifters play a prominent role in folk tales worldwide. However, depending on local fauna, other predatory animals may take the place of the wolf. Many similarities with Slavic werewolf beliefs are found in the views of neighboring peoples, such as the Lithuanians, Estonians, Finns, and others.

The image of a sorcerer in wolf form is closely related to mythical leaders or shepherds of wolves, such as the Meneur de loups (wolf shepherd) among South Slavs, often appearing as a white wolf, a forest spirit among East Slavs, George the Victorious, or other saints, as well as shepherds. Beliefs about wolf-shapeshifters are similar to those about dog-shapeshifters. Among Slovenes, werewolf legends are akin to stories about psoglavci, and the creature vedomec (rolling in unplowed manure, battling the household-protecting kresnik, causing solar eclipses). In Polesia, the werewolf image merges with that of the cursed: avoiding others' food, existing outside human spaces, and a "semantic of constant movement" in descriptions of their state (e.g., "they run"). In Ukrainian folk tales, there is an example opposite to lycanthropy: Saint Yurii punishes a wolf by turning it into a human, forcing it to work for three years for a beggar whose last piece of bread it ate; the former wolf becomes a skilled blacksmith and even learns to reforge old people into young ones.

Beyond its primary meaning, the term "volkolak" could refer to a mythical leader of wolves, appearing as either a wolf or a human. In the Gomel Region, a volkolak could also be understood as a creature appearing at a cemetery, neither beast nor human, with a tail and a glowing lantern (or one or two candles on its head); in other cases, it was a being with both human and animal traits. In some places, the word volkolak referred to an ordinary wolf or a wolf with specific traits: a dog-wolf hybrid, a huge wolf, a male wolf or, conversely, a she-wolf, a solitary wolf, a wolf entering a village, or an old wolf. The term was also used as an insult for unsociable, taciturn, gloomy, cruel, or excessively hairy people.

== In literary works ==
Numerous literary works by Slavic authors across various genres depict werewolfery, with the werewolf image acquiring new traits not typical of legendary traditions. The main themes include: the duality of the werewolf's body and soul, changes in worldview, adaptation to a new way of life, longing for the human condition, the blending and conflict of human and animal within one being, aggression and fear of it, circumstances revealing bloodthirstiness, and the fear of solitary individuals. Many modern Slavic works about werewolves are visibly influenced by stereotypical images from Western popular culture.

The Russian-language novella Werewolf (1829) by writer Orest Somov is dedicated to werewolfery. Based on Ukrainian beliefs, it depicts a simple-minded young man who, imitating a sorcerer, transforms into a wolf, but his inexperience leads to trouble. The work itself remained forgotten for over one and a half centuries, but the so-called Werewolf's Spell within it, where a sorcerer asks the moon to protect him from wolves and people, was cited in scholarly literature as a folk spell until the early 21st century, thanks to I. P. Sakharov. In the Christmas story based on Polesie traditions, Silver Wolf (1901) by Alexander Kuprin, a once-sociable young man transforms into a sullen, bloodthirsty werewolf, losing human traits. The reason for the transformation is not described, only that it occurred during a war, with the author portraying war as fatally destroying the human in a person. The hero becomes alien in human society, belonging now to the world of predators. In the story A Werewolf Problem in Central Russia (1991) by Victor Pelevin, the protagonist concludes that there is practically no difference between humans and wolves: the same problems, the same relationships. The author revisits the theme of werewolfery in the novel The Sacred Book of the Werewolf (2004), where werewolves symbolize people who have lost God and "become victims of their own base instincts".

The image of the werewolf has been frequently explored by Belarusian writers. Pavlyuk Bahrym in the poem Play, Play, Little Boy... (1820s) and Olgerd Obukhovich in the fable Werewolf (1861) suggest that it is better to be a "free werewolf" than to live in captivity. In the poems Lull, Lull, Little Man! (1907), The Forgotten Tavern (1907), Werewolf (1911), and Hokhlik (1911) by Yanka Kupala, the werewolf image is presented as "infernal, bringing death and fear". It represents a person who has forgotten their roots. In the story Werewolves by Alies Kazyadub, the werewolf image is full of tragedy—an enchanted werewolf is an outcast in the human world. In the novella The Hunt for the Great Beast by Alies Navarych, the mythologeme of the werewolf is used in a psychological context—"a person with beastly behavior." Hiding from authorities, the protagonist retreats to the forest to live with wolves and becomes their leader. Werewolves also appear in the poem Werewolves by Alies Harun, the story The Night When the Fern Blooms by Yakub Kolas, the story The Last Werewolf by Alies Kaska, the story Descendants of the Neuri (2003) by Alies Bychkowski, and works by Olga Ipatova, Vladimir Orlov, and Alexander Ryazanov. Many Belarusian works addressing werewolfery are dedicated to the Prince of Polotsk Vseslav Bryachislavich, such as the novel The Werewolf's Trail (The Sorcerer's Path) (1988) by Leanid Daineka. The misdeeds of a peasant forcibly turned into a werewolf are described in the story Listen to How the Leaves Fall (2003) (published in the collection No One Above Us (2006) under the title Leaf Fall) by Belarusian fantasy writer Olga Gromyko, working in the subgenre of Slavic fantasy.

In Ukrainian literature, many werewolf images have also been created. In the drama Forest Song (1911) by Lesya Ukrainka, the Forest Spirit transforms a young man into a werewolf as punishment for betraying his beloved Mavka ("Now he is a wild werewolf! Let him whimper, let him wail, howl, let him thirst for human blood—he will not quench his evil torment!"). However, Mavka, seeing his suffering, sacrifices herself to restore his human form. In the historical novel Hetman Kyrylo Rozumovsky (1961) by Mykola Lazorsky, the valiant Cossack colonel Semen Nezhivoy (1744—?) can transform into a wolf. In the novel Confession (1970) by Valeriy Shevchuk, an enchanted hero must endure a difficult struggle with his dark side, resisting the temptation to pass on his werewolfery to another, and preserve his humanity while in a beastly body before regaining his human form. In the novel Lone Wolf (1971) by Volodymyr Drozd, the motif of transformation into a wolf is used to depict the dehumanization of the author's contemporary society and the alienation of people prioritizing bourgeois values. In the historical novel Orda (1992) by Roman Ivanychuk, traitors are turned into wolves under a curse; the werewolf image symbolizes evil that, growing in a person's soul, paralyzes their will and drives them to shameful acts. In the novella Cursed Treasure (2001) by Volodymyr Arenev, a werewolf-dual-souled being faces the risk of losing their human soul entirely to a wolf form after the death of their human body but retains it through faith in God, good deeds, and self-sacrifice. Werewolves also appear in works by Stepan Alexandrov (verse story Vovkulaka, 1842), Taras Shevchenko, Mykola Vynhranovsky, Vasyl Slapchuk, Tetyana Malyarchuk, Vladyslav Ivchenko (story "Fatal Beauty and the Biggest Wolf in the World," 2013), Vyacheslav Vasylchenko (novel Hypocrites, or the Gospel of the Werewolf, 2012), and Andriy Kokotyukha (novel Full Moon, 2014).

In Polish literature, werewolves are mentioned in works by Bernard of Lublin (Life of Aesop the Phrygian, 1522), Mikołaj Rej (On the Werewolf from the collection Figliki, 1570), Januarius Sowizralius (1612), Baltyzer from Kalisz County (1615), Stanisław Trembecki (1774), Franciszek Dionizy Kniaźnin (1787), Jan Nepomuk Kamiński (1821), Ignacy Głowinski (Letters of Żegota Kostrowiec, 1848), Kajetan Koźmian (1858), Maciej Bogusz Stęczyński (1860), and others. Jan Barszczewski wrote about werewolves in the novel Szlachcic Zawalnia based on Belarusian folk beliefs (1846). In the novella "Serpent's Crown," characters hesitate to shoot at wolves, recognizing them as enchanted people. In the novella "Werewolf," the protagonist transforms into a wolf after drinking a potion given by a musician at the wedding of his beloved, who was married to a wealthier man. However, he overcomes his beastly instincts, and his good intentions prevail, allowing him to regain his human form. In the novel Krzyżowcy (novel, 1935) by Zofia Kossak-Szczucka, crusaders tell each other terrifying stories about encountering werewolves on their journey. In the novel Jedwiżka and Her Suitors (1962) by Marek Sadzewicz, a horrific man-eating werewolf appears in the characters' dreams, symbolizing savagery and cruelty. Among modern Polish works featuring werewolves are, for example, The Witcher series (since the 1980s) and The Reynevan Saga (2002–2006) by Andrzej Sapkowski, the story Witch and Wolf (2003) by Jarosław Grzędowicz, the story Beasts (2007) by Magda Parus, the novella Beast (2007) by Marek Świerczek, and the story Short Ballad of Transformation (2009) by Paweł Paliński.

== See also ==
- Vrykolakas

== Bibliography ==
=== General sources in Russian ===
- Afanasiev, A. N. (1868). "Sorcerers, Witches, Ghouls, and Werewolves". Poetic Views of the Slavs on Nature: An Attempt at a Comparative Study of Slavic Traditions and Beliefs in Connection with the Mythical Tales of Other Related Peoples. In 3 vols. Vol. 3. Moscow: Published by Soldatenkov, Kozma Terentievich. pp. 525–532, 549–553.
- "Werewolf". Great Russian Encyclopedia. Vol. 5. 2006. p. 634. Archived from the original on 2023-01-03.
- Vlasova M. N. (2008). "Werewolf". Encyclopedia of Russian Superstitions (15000 ed.). Saint Petersburg: Azbuka-Classica. ISBN 978-5-91181-705-3.
- Ivanov, P. V. (1886). "Some Notes on Werewolves and Related Topics (Ivanov)". Kievskaya Starina (6): 356–364.
- Ivanov, P. V. (1900). "Werewolves (Materials for Characterizing the Worldview of Little Russian Peasants)". Jubilee Collection in Honor of Vsevolod Fyodorovich Miller, Published by His Students and Admirers (PDF). Proceedings of the Society of Lovers of Natural Science, Anthropology, and Ethnography, Vol. XCVII; Works of the Ethnographic Department, Vol. XIV. Moscow: A. V. Vasiliev Typography. pp. 292–297. Archived from the original (PDF) on 2016-08-27.
- Krinichnaya, N. A. (2004). "Werewolves". Russian Mythology: The World of Folklore Images. Summa. Moscow: Academic Project (Moscow publisher); Gaudeamus. pp. 640–704.
- Levkiievskaya, E. E. (2000). "Werewolf". Myths of the Russian People. Myths of the Peoples of the World (10000 ed.). Moscow: Astrel, AST. pp. 408–414, 508–509.
- Ivanov, V. V.; Toporov, V. N. (1988). "Werewolf". Mythological Dictionary. Vol. 1. pp. 242–243.
- Vinogradova, L. N.; Levkiievskaya, E. E. (2010). "Werewolf / E. E. Levkiievskaya". Folk Demonology of Polesie: Publications of Texts from the 1980s–1990s. Studia philologica. Vol. I: People with Supernatural Abilities. Moscow: Languages of Slavic Cultures. pp. 478–558, 622–624. ISBN 978-5-9551-0446-1.
- Novichkova T. A. (1995). "Werewolf". Russian Demonological Dictionary (4100 ed.). Saint Petersburg: Saint Petersburg Writer. pp. 114–117. ISBN 5-265-02803-X.
- Gura, A. V.; Levkiievskaya, E. E. "Werewolf". Slavic Demonological Dictionary. Vol. 1. pp. 418–420.
- Tokarev, S. A. (2012). "Beliefs about Animals". In Kovalev, S. I. (ed.). Religious Beliefs of the East Slavic Peoples of the 19th–Early 20th Century. Academy of Fundamental Research: Ethnology (2nd ed.). Moscow: Librokom. pp. 43–47. ISBN 978-5-397-02283-5.
- Shein, P. V. (1902). "Werewolves". Materials for Studying the Life and Language of the Russian Population of the Northwestern Region: in 3 vols. Collection of the Department of Russian Language and Literature of the Imperial Academy of Sciences. Vol. LXXII, No. 4. Vol. III: Description of Housing, Clothing, Food, Occupations, Pastime, Games, Beliefs, Common Law, Sorcery, Witchcraft, Folk Healing, Disease Treatment, Remedies for Misfortunes, Beliefs, Superstitions, Omens, etc. Saint Petersburg: Typography of the Imperial Academy of Sciences. pp. 253–257, 485, 488.
- "Werewolf". Historical Encyclopedia. Vol. VII. pp. 42–43.

=== Sources in other languages ===
- "Werewolf / Solovei, L. M.". Belarusian Mythology: Encyclopedic Dictionary (in Belarusian). Minsk: Belarus. 2004. pp. 70–72. ISBN 985-01-0473-2.
- Bondarenko, A. O. (2015). Cult of the Warrior-Beast in Military Traditions on the Territory of Ukraine: Dissertation for the Degree of Candidate of Historical Sciences: 07.00.05 (PDF) (in Ukrainian). Kyiv: Taras Shevchenko National University of Kyiv.
- Georgieva, I. P. (1993). "In the World of the Dead. Vampire. Master of the House. Navi: Vampire: Werewolf". Bulgarian Folk Mythology (in Bulgarian) (1070 ed.). Sofia: Science and Art. pp. 204–206, 224–225. ISBN 954-02-0077-6.
- Gnatuk, V. M. (1912). "Remnants of Pre-Christian Religious Worldview of Our Ancestors: Werewolves". Ethnographic Collection. Vol. XXXIV. Materials for Ukrainian Demonology, Vol. II, Issue 2 (in Ukrainian). Lviv: Printing House of the Shevchenko Scientific Society. pp. XIII–XIV, 266–267.
- Koval, U. I. (1995). "Werewolf". Folk Beliefs, Superstitions, and Omens. Guide to East Slavic Mythology (in Belarusian). Gomel: Belarusian Agency for Scientific, Technical, and Business Information. pp. 30–32. ISBN 985-415-005-4.
- Vasilevich, V. A., ed. (1994). "Werewolf / Trans. excerpts from works by Shpilevsky, P. M., Lyatsky, E. A., Bogdanovich, A. E., Nikiforovsky, N. Ya., Serzhputovsky, A. K., Shein, P. V., Vasilyeva, A. Ya., Yanchuk, N. A.". Myths of the Homeland: Literary and Artistic Edition (in Belarusian). Minsk: Belarusian Encyclopedia. pp. 15–21. ISBN 5-85700-162-5.
- Popov R. (1985). "On the Werewolf in Bulgarian Folk Beliefs (Historical Roots and Place in Folk Culture)". Proceedings of the National Historical Museum: Collection (in Bulgarian). 5. Sofia: Science and Art: 215–229.
- Shamyakin, I. P., ed. (1989). "Werewolf / Pilipenko, M. F.". Ethnography of Belarus: Encyclopedia (in Belarusian). Minsk: Belarusian Soviet Encyclopedia. pp. 104–105. ISBN 5-85700-014-9.
- Baranowski, B. (1981). "Werewolves". In the Circle of Ghouls and Werewolves (in Polish). Łódź: Łódź Publishing House. pp. 147–156. ISBN 83-218-0072-6.
- Brückner, A. (1985). "Contemporary Folk Beliefs; Ghouls and Werewolves". Slavic and Polish Mythology (in Polish). Warsaw: State Scientific Publishing House. pp. 272–279, 284–288. ISBN 83-01-06245-2.
- Černy, A. (1898). "Wjelkoraz". Mythical Beings of the Lusatian Sorbs (in Serbian). Vol. 2. Budyšin: Published by M. Hórnik and E. Muka. pp. 424–427.
- Ito I. (1981). "The Werewolf Belief among the Slavic Peoples". Bulletin of the National Museum of Ethnology (in Japanese). 6 (4): 767–796. ISSN 0385-180X.
- Kropej, M. (2012). "Werewolf". In Transl. by N. S. Dular and V. Batagelj (ed.). Supernatural Beings from Slovenian Myth and Folktales. Studia mythologica Slavica. Supplementa. Ljubljana: ZRC Publishing in association with the Institute of Slovenian Ethnology at ZRC SAZU. pp. 196–198, 245. ISBN 978-961-254-428-7.
- Máchal, J. (1907). "Views on the Soul in Slavic Folk Tradition: The Soul in Life". Slavic Mythology (in Czech). Prague: J. Otto. pp. 18–20.
- Manugiewicz, J. (1930). "Wolf and Werewolfism". Ziemia (in Polish). XV (15): 459–463.
- Margul T. (1981). "Motifs of Werewolf Belief". Lud (in Polish). 65: 55–90.
- Pelka, L. (1987). "Werewolves". Polish Folk Demonology (in Polish). Iskry. pp. 201–205, 213–214. ISBN 83-207-0610-6.
- Rawita-Gawroński, F. (1913). "Werewolves and Werewolfism". Ziemia (in Polish) (33. — pp. 534–535, No. 34. — pp. 550–552, No. 35. — pp. 566–569).
- Ridley, R. A. (1976). "Wolf and Werewolf in Baltic and Slavic Tradition". The Journal of Indo-European Studies. 4 (4): 321–331. ISSN 0092-2323.
- Slupecki, L. P. (2011). Warriors and Werewolves (in Polish) (3rd revised and expanded ed.). PWN Scientific Publishing House. ISBN 978-83-01-16590-1.
- Wiesthaler, Fr. (1883). "Werewolf and Vampire with Special Reference to Slavic Mythology". Ljubljanski Zvon (in Slovenian) (7. — pp. 145–149, No. 8. — pp. 497–505, No. 9. — pp. 561–569, No. 10. — pp. 633–641, No. 11. — pp. 697–706, No. 12. — pp. 761–771).
- Wilczyńska, E. (2014). "Transformations of the Werewolf in Polish Folklore". Wolves and People. A Small Compendium of Wolfology (in Polish) (250 ed.). gk Grupakulturalna.pl. pp. 237–254. ISBN 978-83-934011-4-7.
- Wollman, Fr. "Vampire Legends in the Central European Region". Czechoslovak Ethnographic Bulletin (in Czech).
Specific sources in Russian
- Balushok, V. G. (2001). "Wolf and Werewolf in the Slavic Tradition in Connection with Archaic Ritual". Ethnolinguistics: Problems of Language and Culture. 13: 215–226. ISSN 0860-8032.
- Valentsova, M. M. (2015). "Ethnolinguistic Commentary on the Etymology of Slavic *vlkodlak" (PDF). In Berezovich (ed.). Ethnolinguistics. Onomastics. Etymology: Materials of the III International Scientific Conference, Yekaterinburg, September 7–11, 2015 (E. L. ed.). Yekaterinburg: Publishing House of Ural State University named after A. M. Gorky. pp. 45–48. ISBN 978-5-7996-1524-6.
- Ivanov, V. V. (2007). "Balkan Names of "Vurdalak" and Their Origin". Balkan Readings 9. Terra Balkanica. Terra Slavica. In Honor of Tatyana Vladimirovna Tsivyan (Moscow, February 6, 2007) (Пробел ed.). Moscow: Institute of Slavic Studies of the Russian Academy of Sciences. pp. 70–79. ISBN 978-5-7576-0198-4.
  - Ivanov, V. V. (2007). "On the Relationship of Inherited ("Genetic" in the Linguistic Sense) and Areal in the Structure of Slavic Languages". In Vyach. Vs. Ivanov (ed.), P. M. Arkadiev (comp.) (ed.). Areal and Genetic in the Structure of Slavic Languages. Materials of the Round Table. Moscow: Probel. pp. 7–16. ISBN 978-5-98604-099-8. [abridged version of the same text]
- Ito, I. (1993). ""Werewolf" and "Wolf Shepherd" — Two Common Slavic Folklore Motifs Related to the Wolf Cult". Comparative and Contrastive Studies in Slavic Languages and Literatures: Japanese Contributions to the XIth International Congress of Slavists: Bratislava, Aug. 31 — Sept. 7, 1993. Tokyo: College of Arts and Sciences, University of Tokyo. pp. 117–138.
- Nikiforovsky, N. Ya., ed. (1897). Folk Omens and Beliefs, Superstitious Rituals and Customs, Legendary Tales about People and Places. Vitebsk: Gubernskaya Typography. pp. 67–70, 264.
- Toporkov, A. L. (2010). "Russian Werewolf and Its English Victims". New Literary Review (Journal) (103): 140–151. ISSN 0869-6365. Archived from the original on 2013-10-26.
Specific sources in other languages
- Ajdacic, D. (2011). "Werewolf (Wolf) in East Slavic Literatures". Language and Culture (in Ukrainian). IV (150) (14): 237–246.
- Andrela, L. V. (2013). Svalyava in Tales and Legends (in Rusyn). Uzhhorod: [б. в.] pp. 36–38, 46–47.
- Davydiuk, V. F. (1995). "Cult of the Wolf in Polesie". Berehynia (in Ukrainian) (1–2 (4–5)): 51–61.
- Ivanov, S. L. (1993). "Werewolf — Prototype… of a Shepherd?". Native Word (in Belarusian). 1 (61): 39–41. ISSN 0234-1360.* Loma, A. (2013). "Saint Sava and Cloud Chasers" (PDF). Collection of Works of the Institute of Byzantine Studies (in Serbian). 50 (2): 1041–1079. doi:10.2298/ZRVI1350041L. ISSN 0584-9888. Archived from the original (PDF) on 2016-03-22.
- Nimchuk, V. V. (2009). "New Insights on an Outstanding Ukrainian Written Monument of the 12th Century". Ukrainian Language (Journal) (in Ukrainian) (4): 89–93. ISSN 1682-3540.
- Novak, V. S. (2009). "Werewolf". Slavic Mythology (Based on Materials from Gomel Region). Humanities. Minsk: Law and Economics. pp. 39–49. ISBN 978-985-442-716-4. Archived from the original on August 13, 2016.
- Potushnyak, F. M. (2011). "Werewolf". In Petrovtsiy, I. Yu. (ed.). Sorcerers of Osi Witchcraft (reprint ed.). Osi: Folk Library. pp. 289–294. Archived from the original on November 17, 2017.
- Rasadzin, S. Ya. (1991). "Werewolf and Wolf King". Belarusian Language and Literature in School (in Belarusian) (1): 54–56. ISSN 0234-1360.
- Sitsko, Z. (1991). "Wolves. Werewolves. Neuri". Belarusian Language and Literature in School (in Belarusian) (1): 56–59. ISSN 0234-1360.
- Khobzei, N. V. (2002). "Werewolf". In Institute of Ukrainian Studies named after I. Krypyakevych, National Academy of Sciences of Ukraine (ed.). Hutsul Mythology: Ethnolinguistic Dictionary (in Ukrainian). Львів: Інститут українознавства імені І. Крип'якевича НАН України. pp. 72–81. ISBN 966-02-2299-8.
- Shamyakina, T. I. (2008). Mythology and Belarusian Literature. School Library (in Belarusian). Minsk: Mastatskaya Litaratura. pp. 22–25. ISBN 978-985-02-0925-2.
- Berwiński, R. W. (1854). Studies on Folk Literature from the Perspective of Historical and Scientific Criticism (in Polish). Vol. 2. Poznań: Published by the author. pp. 50–68.
- Butler, F. (2005). "Russian "vurdalak" 'vampire' and Related Forms in Slavic". Journal of Slavic Linguistics. 13 (2). Slavica Publishers: 237–250. ISSN 1068-2090. JSTOR 24599657.
- Češarek, D. (2015). "Tradition of Dogheads, Werewolves, Wolf Shepherd, and Attila in the Mythical Landscape of Sodražica". Studia mythologica Slavica (in Slovenian) (XVIII): 134–138, 146, 152. ISSN 1581-128X.
- Kowalewska, D. (2009). "Werewolves, Kin of Vampires". Magic and Astrology in Polish Enlightenment Literature (in Polish). Toruń: Scientific Publishing House of Nicolaus Copernicus University. pp. 148–160. ISBN 978-83-231-2331-6.
- Novak, P. (2011). "Slovenian Mythical and Folklore Creatures 'Prescribed' for Teenagers: Werewolf (in Ribnica)". Studia mythologica Slavica (in Slovenian). 14 (14): 331–333. doi:10.3986/sms.v14i0.1617. ISSN 1581-128X.
- Pasarić, M. (2015). "Dead Bodies and Transformations: Werewolves in Some South Slavic Folk Traditions". In Willem de Blécourt (ed.). Werewolf Histories. Palgrave Historical Studies in Witchcraft and Magic. Basingstoke, Hampshire — New York, NY: Palgrave Macmillan. pp. 238–256.
- Pasarić, M. (June 2014). "The Body, the Soul and the Animal Other: Werewolves and Animality". Croatian Journal of Ethnology & Folklore Research = Narodna umjetnost: Hrvatski časopis za etnologiju i folkloristiku. 51 (1): 209–221. doi:10.15176/vol51no110. ISSN 1848-865X.
- Snoj, M. (1984). "What Hides in the Word Werewolf?". Jezik in slovstvo (in Slovenian). 4 (29): 123–126.
Collections of mythological stories
- Gnatuk, V. M., ed. (1903). "Werewolves". Ethnographic Collection. Vol. XV. Materials for Galician-Russian Demonology (in Ukrainian). Lviv: Printing House of the Shevchenko Scientific Society. pp. 175–177.
- Gnatuk V. M., ed. (1912). "Werewolves". Ethnographic Collection. Vol. XXXIV. Materials for Ukrainian Demonology, Vol. II, Issue 2 (in Ukrainian). Lviv: Printing House of the Shevchenko Scientific Society. pp. 85–92.
- Grinblat M. Y. and Gurski A. I., ed. (1983). "About God, Saints, Folk Festivals, and Beliefs. Terrors". Legends and Tales. Belarusian Folk Art / Institute of Art Studies, Ethnography, and Folklore of the Academy of Sciences of the BSSR (in Belarusian). Minsk: Science and Technology. pp. 173–180, 457–459.
- "Materials for Hutsul Demonology: Werewolf / Recorded in Chernyk (Ivano-Frankivsk Oblast), Nadvirna District, 1907–1908, by folk teacher Onyshchuk, Anton Ivanovych". Materials for Ukrainian Ethnology (PDF) (in Ukrainian). Vol. XI. Lviv: Printing House of the Shevchenko Scientific Society. 1909. pp. 130–134.
- Cherepanova, O. A., ed. (1996). "Magic: Witchcraft and Divination". Mythological Stories and Legends of the Russian North. Saint Petersburg: Saint Petersburg University Press. ISBN 5-288-01444-2.
- Vlasova M. N., ed. (2013). "Werewolves". Mythological Stories of Russian Peasants of the 19th–20th Centuries (300 ed.). Saint Petersburg: Pushkin House. pp. 524–545, 836–844. ISBN 978-5-91476-049-3.
- Novak, V. S., ed. (2010). "Werewolf". Mythological Beliefs of Belarusians. Humanities. Minsk: Law and Economics. pp. 41–47. ISBN 9789854428550.
- Vinogradova, L. N. (2010). "Werewolf / E. E. Levkiievskaya". Folk Demonology of Polesie: Publications of Texts from the 1980s–1990s. Studia philologica. Vol. I: People with Supernatural Abilities. Moscow: Languages of Slavic Cultures. pp. 478–558, 622–624. ISBN 978-5-9551-0446-1.
- Novak V. S., ed. (2014). "Werewolf". Lower Mythology of Belarusians in Contemporary Records. Humanities (in Belarusian). pp. 26–28. ISBN 978-9855523728.
- Novak, V. S. (2009). "Werewolf". Slavic Mythology (Based on Materials from Gomel Region). Humanities. Minsk: Law and Economics. pp. 39–49. ISBN 978-9854427164. Archived August 13, 2016, at the Wayback Machine
- Siemieński L., ed. (1845). "138–143, 146". Polish, Ruthenian, and Lithuanian Legends and Tales (in Polish). Poznań.
- "Werewolf. From Dolence Village near Ribnica; recorded in Pekel". Ljubljanski Zvon (in Slovenian) (12): 771–774. 1883.
