= Lamia =

Figure in Greek mythology

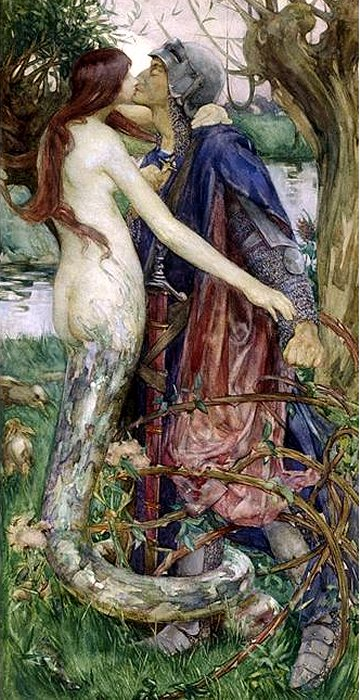
The Kiss of the Enchantress (Isobel Lilian Gloag, c. 1890), inspired by Keats's "Lamia", depicts Lamia as half-serpent, half-woman

Lamia (/ˈleɪmiə/; Ancient Greek: Λάμια, romanized: Lámia), in ancient Greek mythology, was a child-eating monster and, in later tradition, was regarded as a type of night-haunting spirit or "daimon".

In the earliest myths, Lamia was a beautiful queen of ancient Libya who had an affair with Zeus and gave birth to his children. Upon learning of this, Zeus's wife Hera robbed Lamia of her children, either by kidnapping them and hiding them away, killing them outright, or forcing Lamia to kill them. The loss of her children drove Lamia insane, and she began hunting and devouring others' children. Either because of her anguish or her cannibalism, Lamia was transformed into a horrific creature. Zeus gifted Lamia the power of prophecy and the ability to take out and reinsert her eyes, possibly because Hera cursed her with insomnia or the inability to close her eyes.

The lamiai (Ancient Greek: λάμιαι, romanized: lámiai) also became a type of phantom, synonymous with the empusai who seduced young men to satisfy their sexual appetite and fed on their flesh afterward. An account of Apollonius of Tyana's defeat of a lamia-seductress inspired the poem "Lamia" by John Keats.

Lamia has been ascribed serpentine qualities, which some commentators believe can be firmly traced to mythology from antiquity; they have found analogues in ancient texts that could be designated as lamiai, which are part-snake beings. These include the half-woman, half-snake beasts of the "Libyan myth" told by Dio Chrysostom, and the monster sent to Argos by Apollo to avenge Psamathe, daughter of King Crotopos. Snake-like traits also appear in other ancient mythological figures such as the Medusa and the Chimera.

In previous centuries, Lamia was used in Greece as a bogeyman to frighten children into obedience, similar to the way parents in Spain, Portugal and Latin America used the Coco.

== Etymology ==
A scholiast to Aristophanes claimed that Lamia's name derived from her having a large throat or gullet (λαιμός; laimós). (Note: Scholiast on Wasps, 1035.) Modern scholarship reconstructs a Proto-Indo-European stem *lem-, "nocturnal spirit", whence also comes lemures.

== Classical mythology ==
Aristotle's Nicomachean Ethics (vii.5) refers to the lore of some beastly lifeform in the shape of a woman, which tears the bellies of pregnant mothers and devours their fetuses. An anonymous commentator on the passage states this is a reference to the Lamia, but muddlingly combines this with Aristotle's subsequent comments and describes her as a Scythian of the Pontus (Black Sea) area. (Note: Aristotle, Nicomachean Ethics 1148b.)

According to one myth, Hera deprived Lamia of the ability to sleep, making her constantly grieve over the loss of her children, and Zeus provided relief by endowing her with removable eyes. He also gifted her with a shapeshifting ability in the process.

=== De-mythologized ===
Diodorus Siculus (fl. 1st century BC) gave a de-mythologized account of Lamia as a queen of Libya who ordered her soldiers to snatch children from their mothers and kill them, and whose beauty gave way to bestial appearance due to her savageness. The queen, as related by Diodorus, was born in a cave. Heraclitus Paradoxographus (2nd century) also gave a rationalizing account.

Diodorus's rationalization was that the Libyan queen in her drunken state was as if she could not see, allowing her citizens free rein for any conduct without supervision, giving rise to the folk myth that she places her eyes in a vessel. Heraclitus's euhemerized account explains that Hera, consort of Zeus, gouged the eyes out of the beautiful Lamia.

=== Genealogy ===
Lamia was the daughter born between King Belus of Egypt and Lybie, according to one source. (Note: Making her the granddaughter of Poseidon. Lybie is a personification of Libya.)

According to the same source, Lamia was taken by Zeus to Italy, and that Lamos, the city of the man-eating Laestrygonians, was named after her. A different authority remarks that Lamia was once queen of the Laestrygonians. (Note: Scholium to Theocritus Idylls 15.40.) (Note: The same scholium states that Mormo and Gello are equivalent to Lamia, therefore by transference Mormo is queen of the Laestrygonians, hence: Stannish & Doran (2013), p. 118.) (Note: Horace makes a related joke, referring to the aforementioned Lucius Aelius Lamia the praetor as "Lamus", in this instance regarded as the founding figure of the city of the Laestrygonians.)

=== Aristophanes ===
Aristophanes wrote in two plays an identically worded list of foul-smelling objects which included the "Lamia's testicles", thus making Lamia's gender ambiguous. (Note: This prompted Henderson (1998) to "humorlessly infer" that the Lamia must have been a hermaphrodite. Ogden (2013a), p. 91, note 117.) This was later incorporated into Edward Topsell's 17th-century envisioning of the lamia.

It is somewhat uncertain if this refers to the one Lamia (Note: viz. Scholia to the passages whose annotations refer to her,) or to "a Lamia" among many, as given in some translations of the two plays; a generic lamia is also supported by the definition as some sort of a "wild beast" in the Suda.

== Hellenistic folklore ==
=== As children's bogey ===
The "Lamia" was a bogeyman or bugbear term, invoked by a mother or a nanny to frighten children into good behavior. Such practices are recorded by the 1st century Diodorus, and other sources in antiquity.

Numerous sources attest to the Lamia being a "child-devourer", one of them being Horace. Horace in Ars Poetica cautions against the overly fantastical: "[nor should a story] draw a live boy out of a Lamia's belly". (Note: Neu pransae Lamiae vivum puerum extrahat alvo (v. 340). Alexander Pope translates the line: Shall Lamia in our sight her sons devour, /and give them back alive the self-same hour?) Lamia was in some versions thus seen as swallowing children alive, and there may have existed some nurse's tale that told of a boy extracted alive out of a Lamia.

The Byzantine lexicon Suda (10th century) gave an entry for lamía, with definitions and sources much as already described. The lexicon also has an entry under mormo (Μορμώ), stating that Mormo and the equivalent μορμολυκεῖον (mormolykeion) are called lamía, and that all these refer to frightful beings.

"Lamia" has as synonyms "Mormo" and "Gello" according to the scholia to Theocritus.

Other bogeys have been listed in conjunction with "Lamia", for instance, the Gorgo (ἡ Γοργώ), the eyeless giant Ephialtes, and a Mormolyce (μορμολύκη) named by Strabo. (Note: Hamilton, H.C.; Falconer, W. edd., Strabo, Geography I.2.8)

=== As a seductress ===
In later classical periods, around the 1st century A.D., the conception of this Lamia shifted to that of a sultry seductress who enticed young men and devoured them.

==== Apollonius of Tyana ====
A representative example is Philostratus's novelistic biography Life of Apollonius of Tyana.

It purports to give a full account of the capture of "Lamia of Corinth" by Apollonius, as the general populace referred to the legend. (Note: This is given in the concluding paragraph of the chapter, Vit. Apollon. 4.25. Phillimore tr., p. 26.) An apparition (phasma φάσμα (Note: This phasma is a more "generic term for creatures".)) which in the assumed guise of a woman seduced one of Apollonius's young pupils.

Here, Lamia is the common vulgar term and empousa the proper term. For Apollonius in speech declares that the seductress is "one of the empousai, which most other people would call lamiai and mormolykeia". (Note: In Greek: "μία τῶν ἐμπουσῶν ἐστιν, ἃς λαμίας τε καὶ μορμολυκίας οἱ πολλοὶ ἡγοῦνται", Vit. Apollon. 4.25. Where Felton gives "mormolyces", Ogden "renders as "bogey".) The use of the term lamia in this sense is however considered atypical by one commentator.

Regarding the seductress, Apollonius further warned, "you are warming a snake (ophis) on your bosom, and it is a snake that warms you". It has been suggested from this discourse that the creature was therefore "literally a snake". (Note: Keats's reworking makes this Lamia have serpent form for certain, which she wants to lose.) The empousa admits in the end to fattening up her victim (Menippus of Lycia) to be consumed, as she was in the habit of targeting young men for food "because their blood was fresh and pure". The last statement has led to the surmise that this lamia/empusa was a sort of blood-sucking vampiress.

Another aspect of her powers is that this empusa/lamia is able to create an illusion of a sumptuous mansion, with all the accoutrements and even servants. But once Apollonius reveals her false identity at the wedding, the illusion fails her and vanishes.

==== Lamia the courtesan ====
A longstanding joke makes a word play between Lamia the monster and Lamia of Athens, the notorious hetaira courtesan who captivated Demetrius Poliorcetes (died 283 BC). The double-entendre sarcasm was uttered by Demetrius's father, among others. (Note: Demetrius's father Antigonus and Demochares of Soli.) The same joke was used in theatrical Greek comedy, and generally. The word play is also seen as being employed in Horace's Odes, to banter Lucius Aelius Lamia the praetor. (Note: Grandfather of his namesake, the consul Lucius Aelius Lamia (d. 33 CE).)

==== Golden Ass ====
In Apuleius's The Golden Ass (Note: Or Metamorphoses, thus abbreviated "Apu. Met.") appear two Thessalian "witches", (Note: They are not strictly speaking "witches", but they are referred to as such by convention. In the Latin text, Meroe is referred to as a saga, a wise woman or soothsayer.) Meroe and her sister Panthia, who are called lamiae in one instance. (Note: It has been cautioned that there may not be great import in the label "lamiae" here beyond derogatory insult, and Apuleius uses the label rather indescriminately elsewhere.) (Note: The Elizabethan translator William Adlington rendered lamiae as "hags".)

Meroe has seduced a man named Socrates, but when he plots to escape, the two witches raid his bed, thrust a knife in the neck to tap the blood into a skin bag, eviscerate his heart, and stuff the hole back with sponge.

Some commentators, despite the absence of actual blood-sucking, find these witches to share "vampiric" qualities of the lamiae (lamiai) in Philostratus's narrative, thus offering it up for comparison.

== Kindreds ==
Lamia's possible kindred kind appear in Classical works, but may be known by other names except for isolated instance which calls Lamia. Or they may be simply unnamed or differently named. And those analogues that exhibit a serpentine form or nature have been especially noted.

=== Poine of Argos ===
One such possible lamia is the avenging monster sent by Apollo against the city of Argos and killed by Coroebus. It is referred to as Poine or Ker in classical sources, but in the medieval period one source does call it a lamia (First Vatican Mythographer, c. 9th to 11th century).

The story surrounds the tragedy of the daughter of King Crotopus of Argos, named Psamathe, whose child by Apollo dies, and she is executed for suspected promiscuity. Apollo as punishment then sends the child-devouring monster to Argos.

In Statius' version, the monster had a woman's face and breasts and a hissing snake protruding from the cleft of her rusty-colored forehead, and it would slide into children's bedrooms to snatch them. According to a scholiast to Ovid, it had a serpent's body carrying a human face.

In Pausanias's version, the monster is called Poinē (ποινή), meaning "punishment" or "vengeance", but there is nothing about a snake on her forehead.

One evidence this may be a double of Lamia comes from Plutarch, who equates the word empousa with poinē.

=== Monsters of Syrtis ===
A second example is a colony of man-eating monsters in Syrtis that in Libya, described by Dio Chrysostom in the Libyan myth. These monsters had a woman's torso and beastly hands, and "all the lower part was snake, ending in the snake's baleful head". (Note: Incidentally, Dio in Oration 37 quotes a Sibyl's song in which the Sibyl (Libyan Sibyl) identifies her mother as Lamia (daughter of Poseidon).) The idea that these creatures were lamiai, with Lamia as their leader, seems to originate with Alex Scobie (1977), and to be accepted by other commentators. Dio recounts two attempts to wipe out the monsters. In the first, an anonymous Libyan king leads an expedition to their nest and sets it on fire. The king and his army depart quickly, but after they make camp for the night, surviving monsters attack the camp and kill them all. In the second, Heracles successfully eliminates Lamia and her monsters.

== Middle Ages ==
By the Early Middle Ages, lamia (pl. lamiai or lamiae) was being glossed as a general term referring to a class of beings. Hesychius of Alexandria's lexicon (c. 500 A.D.) glossed lamiai as apparitions, or even fish. (Note: Aristotle says there is a shark called "lamia".Resnick & Kitchell (2007), p. 83) Isidore of Seville defined them as beings that snatched babies and ripped them apart.

The Vulgate used "lamia" in Isaiah 34:14 to translate "Lilith" of the Hebrew Bible. Pope Gregory I (d. 604)'s exegesis on the Book of Job explains that the lamia represented either heresy or hypocrisy.

Christian writers also warned against the seductive potential of lamiae. In his 9th-century treatise on divorce, Hincmar, archbishop of Reims, listed lamiae among the supernatural dangers that threatened marriages, and identified them with geniciales feminae, female reproductive spirits.

== Interpretations ==
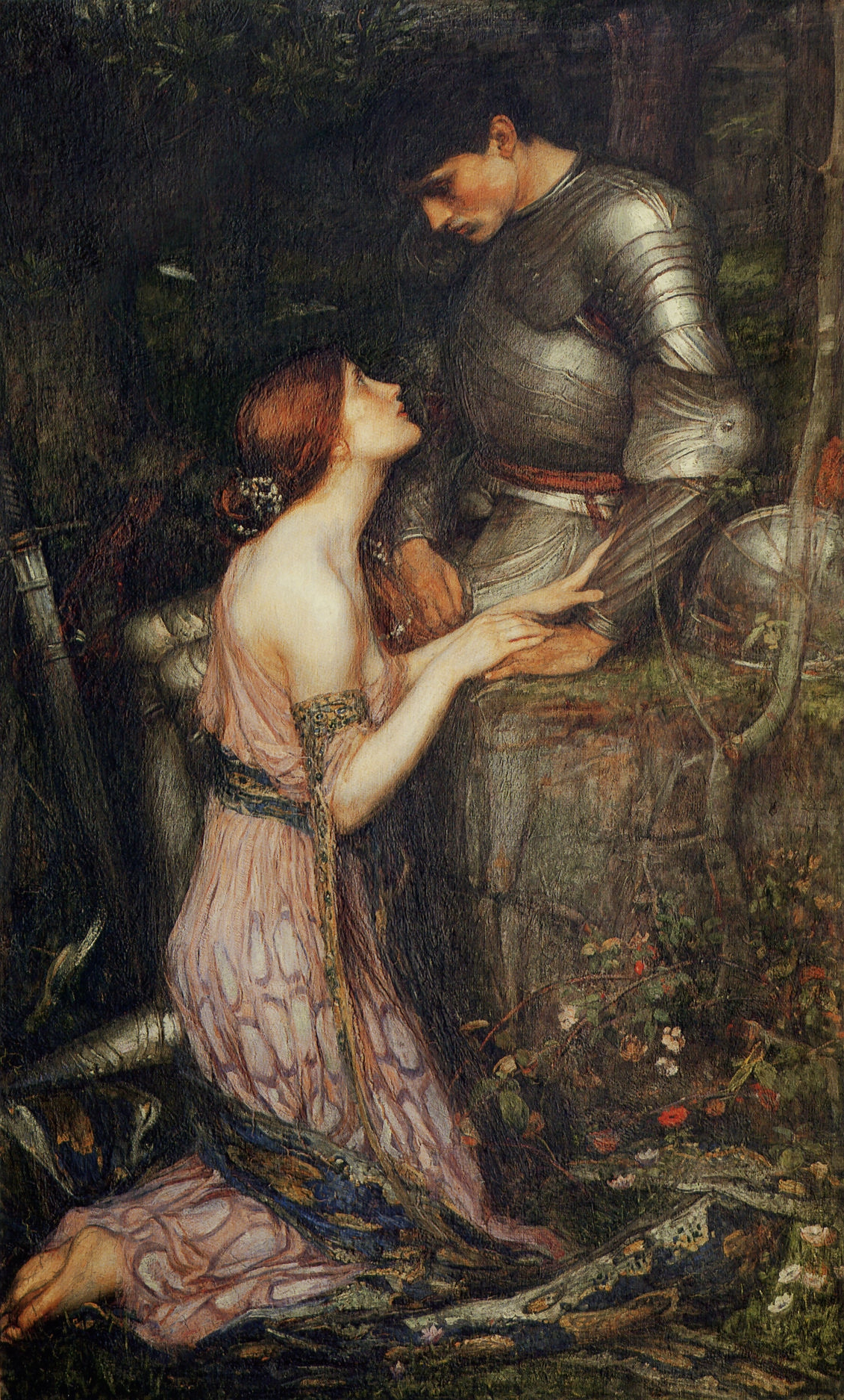
Lamia (first version) by John William Waterhouse (1905). (Note: Note the snakeskin wrapped around her arm and waist.)

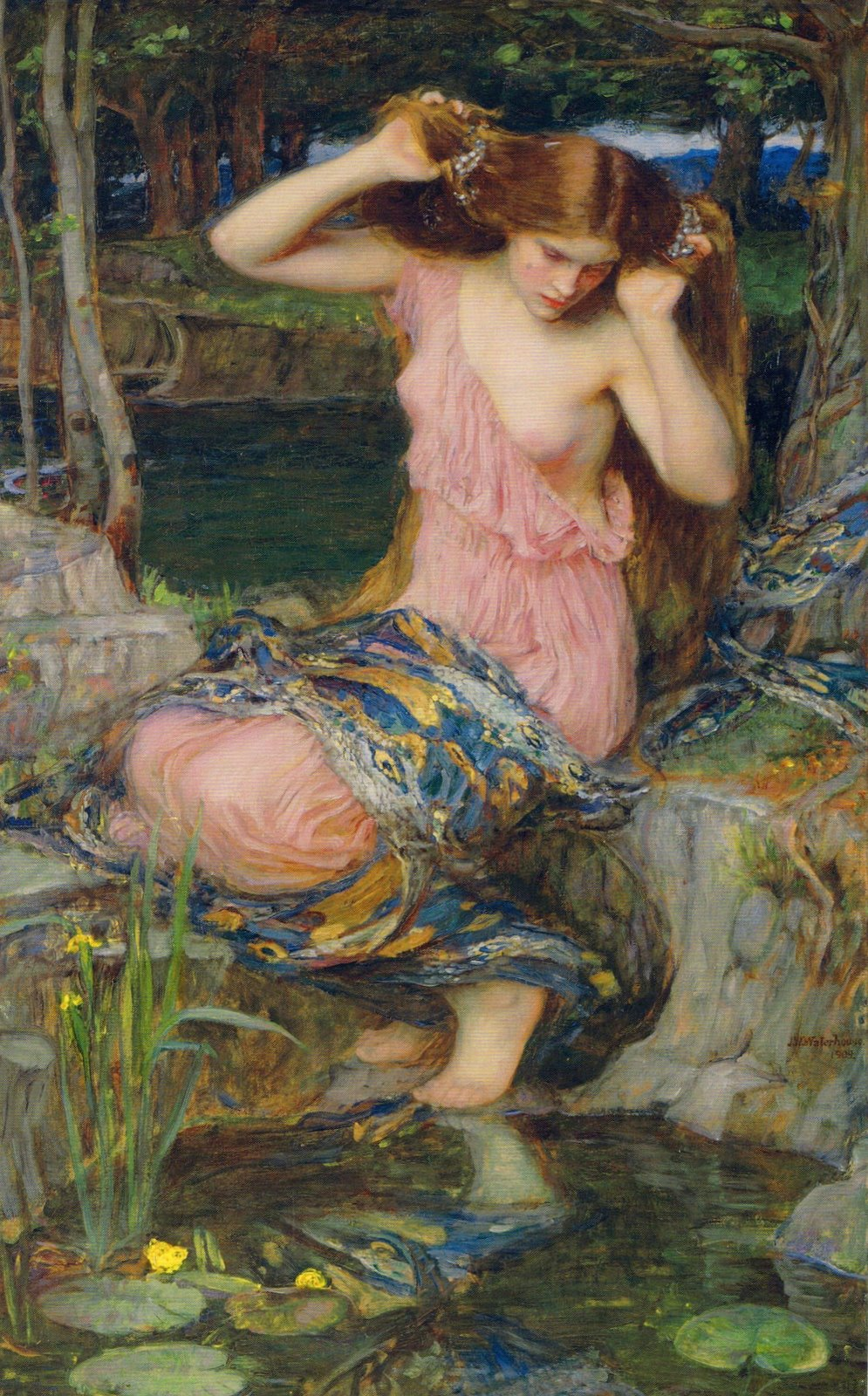
Lamia (second version), with snakeskin on her lap, John William Waterhouse (1909)

This Lamia of Libya has her double in Lamia-Sybaris of the legend around Delphi, both indirectly associated with serpents. A strong parallel with the Medusa has also been noted. These, and other considerations have prompted modern commentators to suggest she is a dragoness.

Another double of the Libyan Lamia may be Lamia, daughter of Poseidon. Lamia by Zeus gave birth to a Sibyl according to Pausanias, and this would have to be the Libyan Lamia, yet there is a tradition that Lamia the daughter of Poseidon was the mother of a Sibyl. Either one could be Lamia the mother of Scylla mentioned in the Stesichorus (d. 555 BC) fragment, and other sources. (Note: Campbell, David A., ed. (1991), Stesichorus, Frag 220, translated by Campbell, David A., Harvard University Press, ISBN 9780674995253, p. 133, and note 2. This fragment = Scholios on Apollonius Rhodius 4.828.) (Note: While Odyssey 12.124 itself says Scylla's mother was Crataeis, its scholiast mentions the non-Homeric tradition that Lamia was her mother.) Scylla is a creature depicted variously as anguipedal or serpent-bodied.

=== Identification as a serpent-woman ===
Diodorus Siculus (fl. 1st century BC), for instance, describes Lamia of Libya as having nothing more than a beastly appearance. Diodorus, Duris of Samos and other sources which comprise the sources for building an "archetypal" picture of Lamia do not designate her as a dragoness, or give her explicit serpentine descriptions.

In the 1st-century Life of Apollonius of Tyana the female empousa-lamia is also called "a snake", which may seem to the modern reader to be just a metaphorical expression, but which Daniel Ogden insists is a literal snake. Philostratus's tale was reworked by Keats in his poem Lamia, where it is made clear she bears the guise of a snake, which she wants to relinquish in return for human appearance.

Modern commentators have also tried to establish that she may have originally been a dragoness, by inference. Daniel Ogden argues that one of her possible reincarnations, the monster of Argos killed by Coroebus had a "scaly gait", indicating she must have had an anguipedal form in an early version of the story, although the Latin text in Statius merely reads inlabi (declension of labor) meaning "slides".

One of the doubles of Lamia of Libya is the Lamia-Sybaris, which is described only as a giant beast by Antoninus Liberalis (2nd century). It is noted that this character terrorized Delphi, just as the dragon Python had.

Close comparison is also made with the serpentine Medusa. Not only is Medusa identified with Libya, she also had dealings with the three Graeae who had the removable eye shared between them. In some versions, the removable eye belonged to the three Gorgons, Medusa and her sisters.

=== Hecate ===
Some commentators have also equated Lamia with Hecate. The basis of this identification is the variant maternities of Scylla, sometimes ascribed to Lamia (as already mentioned), and sometimes to Hecate. The identification has also been built (using transitive logic) since each name is identified with empousa in different sources. (Note: Philostratus's biography identified empousa with lamia, as already given. Empusa is equated with Hecate in a fragment of Aristophanes's lost play, Tagenistae.)

=== Stench of a lamia ===
A foul odor has been pointed out as a possible common motif or attribute of the lamiai. The examples are Aristophanes's reference to the "lamia's testicles", the scent of the monsters in the Libyan myth which allowed the humans to track down their lair, and the terrible stench of their urine that lingered in the clothing of Aristomenes, which they showered upon him after carving out his friend Sophocles's heart.

=== Mesopotamian connection ===
Lamia may originate from the Mesopotamian demoness Lamashtu.

== Modern age ==
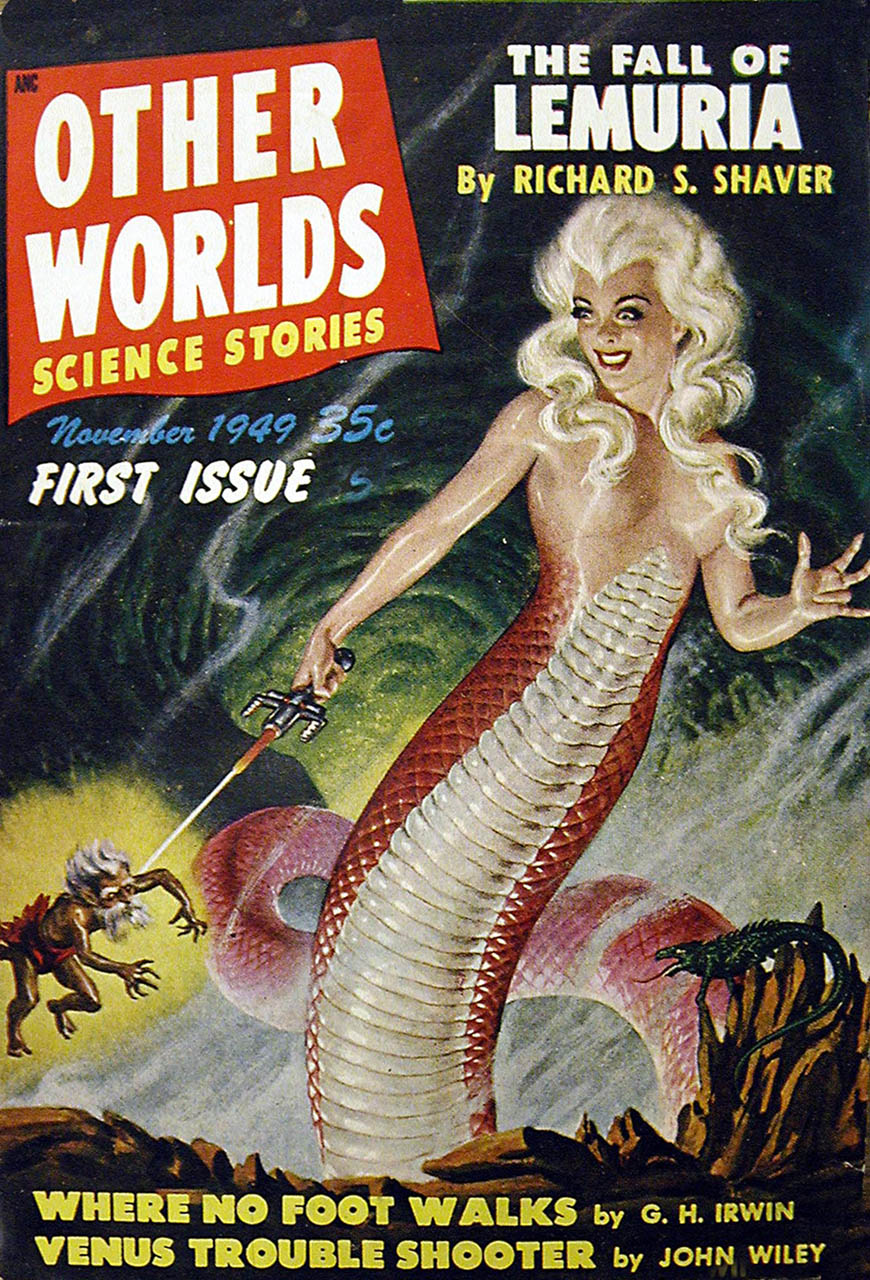
A lamia-like creature on the cover of Other Worlds, November 1949.

Renaissance writer Angelo Poliziano wrote Lamia (1492), a philosophical work whose title is a disparaging reference to his opponents who dabble in philosophy without competence. It alludes to Plutarch's use of the term in De curiositate, where the Greek writer suggests that the term Lamia is emblematic of meddlesome busybodies in society. Worded another way, Lamia was emblematic of the hypocrisy of such scholars.

From around the mid-15th century into the 16th century, the lamia came to be regarded exclusively as witches.

=== Bestiary ===
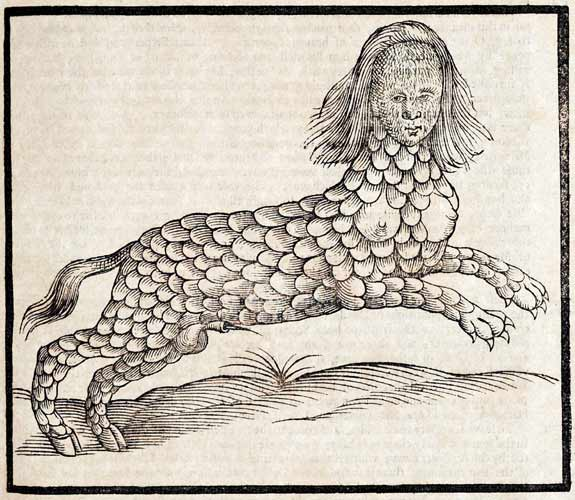
A 17th-century depiction of Lamia from Edward Topsell's The History of Four-Footed Beasts

In Edward Topsell's History of Four-footed Beasts (1607), the lamia is described as having the upper body (i.e., the face and breasts) of a woman, but with goatlike hind quarters with large and filthy "stones" (testicles) that smell like sea-calves, on authority of Aristophanes. It is covered with scales all over.

=== Adaptations ===
John Keats's "Lamia" in his Lamia and Other Poems is a reworking of the tale in Apollonius's biography by Philostratus, described above. In Keats's version, the student Lycius replaces Menippus the Lycian. For the descriptions and nature of the Lamia, Keats drew from Burton's The Anatomy of Melancholy. August Enna wrote an opera called Lamia.

A Lamia appears in the 1914 story "An Episode of Cathedral History" by M. R. James.

English composer Dorothy Howell composed a tone poem Lamia which was played repeatedly to great acclaim under its dedicatee Sir Henry Wood at the London Promenade concerts in the 1920s. It has been recorded more recently by Rumon Gamba conducting the BBC Philharmonic Orchestra for Chandos Records in a 2019 release of British tone poems.

The 1982 novel Lamia by Tristan Travis sees the mythological monster relocated to 1970s Chicago, where she takes bloody vengeance on sex offenders while the cops try to figure out the mystery.

Lamia, also known as Ramia, appears as a boss in the Nintendo DS action role-playing game Deep Labyrinth.

Lamia is the main antagonist in the 2009 horror film Drag Me to Hell. In the film, Lamia is described as "the most feared of all demons" and having the head and hooves of a goat. A Romani curse associated with him has Lamia torment the victim for three days before having its minions drag them into Hell to burn in its fires for all eternity.

A Lamia appears in the BBC series Merlin in series 4. Described as having the blood of both woman and serpent, she draws the life out of men through a kiss in her seductress form before turning into a serpent-like creature. She is killed by Prince Arthur.

Lamia appears as an antagonist in Rick Riordan's The Demigod Diaries, appearing in its fourth short story "The Son of Magic". She is depicted as the daughter of Hecate and as having glowing green eyes with serpentine slits, shriveled hands with lizard-like claws, and crocodile-like teeth.

In the manga and anime Monster Musume, the character Miia is a lamia. The main character of Dropkick on My Devil!, Jashin-chan, is also a lamia.

In Gerald Brom's Lost Gods, Lamia serves as the primary antagonist, depicted as an ancient succubus who prolongs her life by drinking the blood of her children and grandchildren.

Lamias are featured in the progressive rock album The Lamb Lies Down on Broadway by Genesis on the track "The Lamia". They are depicted as female creatures with "snake-like" bodies and seduce the protagonist Rael in an attempt to devour him, but as soon as they "taste" Rael's body, the blood that enters the lamias' bodies causes their death.

Lamia is mentioned several times in the Iron Maiden song "Prodigal Son" from their 1981 album Killers. The band often refer to mythology and mythical beasts in their compositions.

The American TV series Raised by Wolves features a character named Lamia, an android mother, who has removable eyes and the ability to shapeshift.

The 2024 British fantasy TV series Domino Day, set in modern-day Manchester, features Siena Kelly as the titular lead character, a witch who feeds on the energy of her dating-app hook-ups. She eventually realizes that she is actually a lamia.

=== Modern folk traditions ===
In modern Greek folk tradition, the Lamia has survived and retained many of her traditional attributes. John Cuthbert Lawson remarks "the chief characteristics of the Lamiae, apart from their thirst for blood, are their uncleanliness, their gluttony, and their stupidity". The contemporary Greek proverb, "της Λάμιας τα σαρώματα" ("the Lamia's sweeping"), epitomises slovenliness; and the common expression, "τό παιδί τό 'πνιξε η Λάμια" ("the child has been strangled by the Lamia"), explains the sudden death of young children.

Later traditions referred to many lamiae; these were folkloric monsters similar to vampires and succubi that seduced young men and then fed on their blood.

=== Fine arts ===
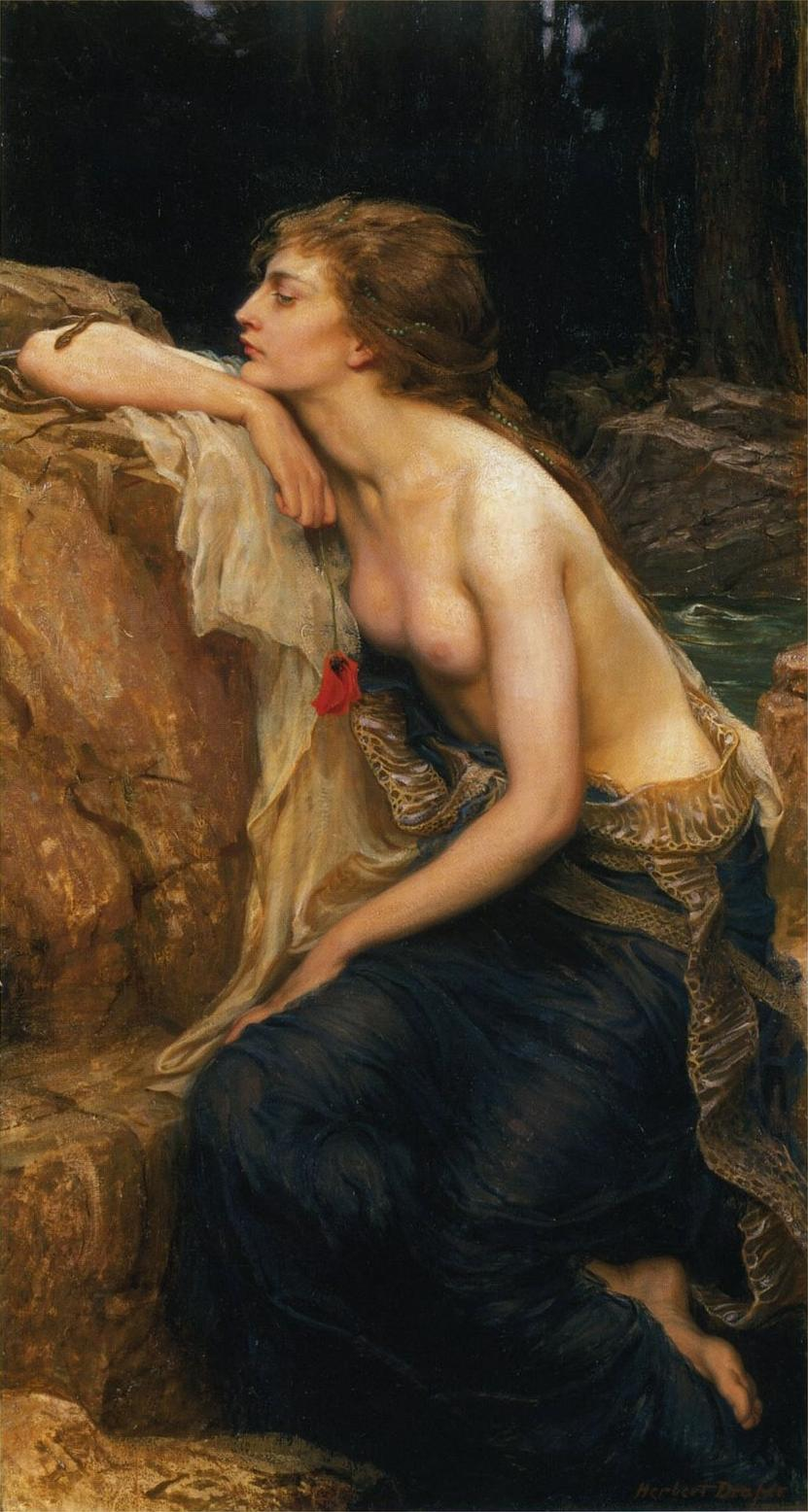
The Lamia (1909), (Note: Lamia has human legs and a snakeskin around her waist. There is also a small snake on her right forearm.) a painting by Herbert James Draper

In a 1909 painting by Herbert James Draper, the Lamia who moodily watches the serpent on her forearm appears to represent a hetaera. Although the lower body of Draper's Lamia is human, he alludes to her serpentine history by draping a shed snakeskin around her waist. In Renaissance emblems, Lamia has the body of a serpent and the breasts and head of a woman, like the image of hypocrisy.

== See also ==
- Abyzou – Name of a female demon
- Child cannibalism – Practice of eating a child or fetus
- La Llorona – Vengeful ghost in Latin American folklore
- Lamashtu – Mesopotamian mythological figure
- Lamia (Basque mythology) – Creature from Basque mythology
- Lamnidae – Family of sharks
- Melusine – Water sprite
- Nāga – Mythological creatures in Indian religions
- Vrykolakas – Vampiric undead creature in Greek folklore
