= Gello =

Demon in Greek and Byzantine mythology

Gello (Ancient Greek: Γελλώ), in Greek mythology, is a female demon or revenant who threatens the reproductive cycle by causing infertility, miscarriage, and infant mortality. By the Byzantine era, the gelloudes (γελλούδες) were considered a class of beings. Women believed to be under demonic possession by gelloudes might stand trial or be subjected to exorcism.

Gyllou, Gylou, Gillo, or Gelu are some of its alternate forms.

== Etymology ==
Gello possibly derives from Gallû, an ancient Mesopotamian demon believed to bring sickness and death. The theory was advanced by Carl Frank (1881–1945) and supported by Martin Litchfield West, Walter Burkert, and others. (Note: Frank, C. (1910) "Zu babylonischen Beschwörungstexten" Zeitschrift für Assyriologie 24 p. 161ff, "Nachtrag" 333f, cited by West, M. L. (2003) pp. 58–59 and by Römer, W.H.Ph. (1969), p.182.) The name is also preserved in the later word ghoul.

Greek folk etymology links the word to the root gel- 'grin, laugh', in the sense of mocking or grimacing, like the expression often found on the face of the Gorgon, to which Barb linked demons exercising a malign influence on reproduction. Such demons are often associated with or said to come from the sea, and demonologies identify Gyllou with Abyzou, whose name is related to abyssos, the abyss or "deep."

== Classical Antiquity ==
According to ancient myth, Gello was a young woman who died a virgin, and returned as a ghost (φάντασμα, phantasma) to do harm to the children of others. The myth is given as an explanation of a proverb by the second-century compiler Zenobius. It is noted that Sappho mentioned her, implying that Gello was a feared bane of children at least as far back as the sixth century BC. (Note: In fact, the proverb, "Fonder of children than Gello" is generally considered a fragment of Sappho's poem.)

The lexicographer Hesychius of Alexandria, who wrote in the fifth or sixth century but drew from earlier lexicons, glossed gello as a ghost (eidolon) who attacked both virgins and newborn babies.

Since the Early Middle Ages, Gello has often been conflated with Lamia and Mormo, two similar mythological figures. Each originated as a single individual woman (with her own origin myth or aition) in Ancient Greece, but later developed into a type of frightening apparition or demon. (Note: Sarah Iles Johnston employs the phrase "reproductive demons" for the three beings.)

== Byzantine Period ==
The gello eventually came to be regarded as a type of being, rather than an individual. The plural form gelloudes (γελοῦδες), not found in Ancient Greek, came into existence in the Byzantine period, and used in the 7th–8th century by the patriarch John of Damascus, in his treatise peri Stryggōn (περί Στρυγγῶν, "Regarding striges"). The gelloudes were considered synonymous to the stryngai (στρίγγαι, Στρῦγγαι) or "witches" by him, and described as beings that flew nocturnally, slipped unhindered into houses even when windows and doors were barred, and strangled infants.

The polymath Michael Psellos of the 11th century inherited the notion that the stryngai and gelloudes were "interchangeable". He described them as beings that "suck blood and devour all the vital fluids which are in the little infant". Psellus documents a widened scope of the Gello's victims in the beliefs of the 11th century. Gello were being held responsible for the deaths of pregnant women and their fetuses as well. Gello (or Gillo) was also blamed for the condition of newborn infants who wasted away, and such infants were called Gillobrota (Γιλλόβρωτα), according to Psellus.

Psellus sought in vain for Ancient Greek sources of these beliefs, and formulated the theory that the gello derived from the Hebrew Lilith. Psellus further stated that the name "Gillo" could not be discovered in his usual sources for demonic names in antiquity, but were to be found in an esoteric or "occult" (ἀπόκρυφος) Hebrew book ascribed to Solomon. (Note: The Testament of Solomon?) Later, the 17th-century Greek Catholic scholar Leo Allatios would criticize Psellos's confounding of the gello and Lilith.

The 14th-century Greek ecclesiastical historian Nikephoros Kallistos Xanthopoulos still told of gelloudes that "bring the infant from the bedroom, as if about to devour him."

== Middle Ages to modern age ==
Aspects of the superstitions about the gelloude may be followed from the Middle Ages from various writings and talismans, to a treatise written by Leo Allatius in the 17th century which reveal that medieval beliefs and practices were still to be found among the common people of his day.

=== Corporeal and phantom forms ===
Although reports of Gello's behavior are consistent, her nature is less determinate. In the 7-8th century, John of Damascus equated the gello with the stryggai that sometimes appeared in spirit form while at other times had solid bodies and wore clothing.

The strix could be regarded an "unclean spirit" (akátharton pneuma) subject to demonic excorcism, according to an exorcism text recorded by 17th century writer Allatius. A woman could also be regarded as being a gello by the populace, but the charges were dismissed in an ecclesiastical trial c. 8th century. The orthodox theology of the Church, expounded by Psellos or Ignatius, held that a woman's gendered nature precluded her from turning into a demon, since a demon was officially considered sexless. Johnston prefers to use the Greek word aōros or aōrē 'untimely dead' (Note: aōros being a term employed by Zenobius and Hesychius.) for this form of transgressive or liminal soul or entity, finding the usual phrase "child-killing demon" to be misleading.

=== From virgin to witch-hags ===
It has been pointed out by modern commentators that even though the original Gello was a young woman who died a virgin, the gelloudes which became synonymous with stryggai or "witches" in the Christian era, were generally regarded as being old envious crones.

Equating gelloudes with the stringai, which occurred by the seventh to eighth century with John of Damascus as already noted, still continued in the times of the 17th century Leo Allatius who said that Striges (in the sense of "witches") was also called Gellones (Latinized form) according to popular belief. Allatius also recorded many variant forms, such as gelu, gello, gillo (in the singular). Leo Allatius wrote that the people who were his contemporaries in Greece were already entrenched in the belief that these witches were generally old crones who contracted with the devil. This, it has been argued, was a transplantation of the image of witch of Western Europe onto the Greek idea of gelloudes.

== Protections against Gello ==
In the Byzantine period, mothers who had given birth customarily relied on amulets designed to protect their newborns from evil, including the Gello or Gyllou. The woman was a rare exception who would shun these charms and put her faith entirely in the power of the Cross.

Leo Allatios in the 17th century would criticize such remnants of sorcery such as these charms, or the hanging of red coral or a head of garlic, and prescribed strictly Christian prophylactics, such as a cross or image of Christ placed by a child's bed to ward off Gello or demons in general, or burning lamps to illuminate sacred images. The practice of baptizing infants was thought to offer protection against demon-snatching, and specifically against the gello, according to Leo Allatios.

=== Charm books ===
The magico-medical compilation Cyranides from the Imperial period provided instructions on how to defend against the gelloudes. The eyeballs of a hyena in a purple pouch was said to be an effective amulet against "all nocturnal terrors, also Gello, who strangles infants and troubles women in childbed". Using an ass's skin as a bedsheet to sleep on was also prescribed as effective against the Gello.

=== Stones ===
The Lithica of the late Hellenistic to early Imperial Period listed magical stones as effective charms as well, although they do not explicitly mention gello either. However, in these texts, galactite is said to protect against either Megaira ("Envy"), or "frightful woman" (horrida mulier) who attacked infants. (Note: The eagle-stone or aetites were originally used as an amulet to prevent miscarriage and promote healthy delivery, but later, they were considered effective protecting against delirium and night terrors, associated with Gello and other demons. The Latin text terroribus nefandis is rendered "unspeakable terrors" elsewhere.)

=== Early Byzantine amulets ===
Some Byzantine amulets against female reproductive demons are said to depict the Gello. This is sometimes asserted as a rule of thumb, without providing reasoning. (Note: Bonner, Campbell (1950), Studies in magical amulets: chiefly Graeco-Egyptian, University of Michigan Press, p. 210, "in Byzantine times the evil creature is Gyllou, or Gyllo, the destroyer of little children, and Sisinnius is the deliverer.", cited by Fulghum (2001), p. 142.) As no Byzantine amulet exists that actually labels the demon as a Gello or Gyllou, the inference is made these are Gello by association with other figures labeled in the amulets, namely the demon Abyzou, the Saint Sisinnios, or the Evil Eye of "Envy".

Numerous early Byzantine amulets (6th to 7th century label its demon as "Abyzou" identifiable with Obyzouth, a demon that strangles newborns according to the 1st to 3rd century Greek text called the Testament of Solomon. (Note: There is one unique example of an amulet labeled "Abyzou" from the later, medieval Byzantine period. It is the specimen held by the Ashmolean Museum in Oxford.Spier (1993), p. 38.) This Abyzou (Obyzouth) has been equated with the Gello (Gyllou), albeit in later literature, for example, the writings of Michael Psellos of the 11th century.

Some Byzantine amulets (Note: Either with or without labeling the demon.) also invoke the name of Saint Sisinnios, who is known foremost as the vanquisher of Gello. Again, the textual evidence that connect Sissinios to Gylou are from much later dates, (Note: The text group has been analyzed by Richard P. H. Greenfield in 1989. These texts are variously referred to: as "historiola" where in "the Greek tradition the woman is usually called Melitene",Spier (1993), p. 36 or "Melitine charm", or "Melitene type of Gylou story", or gello exorcism texts,.) the oldest version of the "Melitine charm" or Legend of St. Sisinnios dating to the 15th century. (Note: It tells of a story of a woman named Melitene persecuted by the child-robbing Gyllou and assisted by her brother St. Sisinnios. These will be discussed below, under §Legend of Saint Sisinnios)

Amulet no. 1 in Schlumberger (1892).

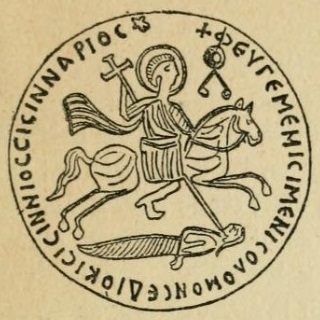
(Side 1) Holy Rider piercing a recumbent female demon with fish or snake-like lower body

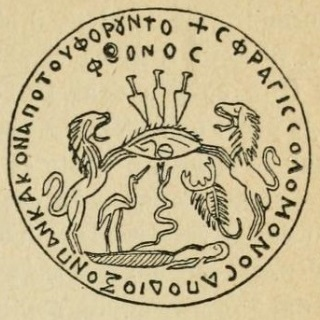
(Side 2) Evil Eye, labeled "Envy", attacked by three blades and beasts

A concrete example is the Schlumberger No. 1 amulet shown on the right. (Note: Currently held at Paris, Cabinet des Médailles, shelfmark Schlumberger 68.) (Note: It becomes clearer the same amulet is being talked about by different commentators (Johnston (2013), p. 193, note 91, Hartnup (2004), pp. 146–147, note 65) by noticing that they cite Paul Perdrizet or Schlumberger pp. 74–75.) Several scholars have hinted that the she-demon here, which has been noticed to have fish- or serpent-like attributes below the waist, may refer to Gello-Gyllou. The demon is being stabbed with a lance by a mounted figure (sometimes called the "holy rider" or "rider saint") which may be St. Sisinnios or Solomon. (Note: Commentators do not necessarily commit to an identification of the rider here, and give a general discussion that the rider is most often Solomon, but that there are other specimen where the rider is Sissinios.) The inscription reads "Flee, detested one, Solomon, Sisinnios and Sisinnarios pursue you". (Note: Greek text: "φεῦγε μεμισιμένι Σολομόν σε διόκι Σισίννιος Σισιννάριος".)

The same amulet has a second side, which depicts an eye as "Envy" (phthonos, φθόνος), attacked by weapons and animals. One of the commentator has specifically connect the Evil Eye of Envy with the Gylou, while the others connect it more vaguely to the child-stealing demon or say that the beings labeled "Envy" are the ghost-demons (aōrē).

=== Envy and Evil eye ===
Gello or Gylou's curse has been associated with the evil eye of Envy at least since the Byzantine period, according to commentators. (Note: Phthonos (Envy) is given as the name of the demon who is the caster of the evil glance, against which the amulet depicting the "suffering eye" is confessed to be effective, according to the Testament of Solomon.) Sarah Iles Johnston views the Phtonos eye on the amulet and the Megaera ("Envious One") invoked in the entry for "galactite" in one Lithica (book of stones), as not just a personification of "Envy" but an aōrē (ghost demons) in their own rights, and insinuates that these charms are meant to apply to one of her specific aōrē, the Lamia, the Gello, or the Mormo. She fortifies her thesis that these aōrē were regarded as envious by pointing to Greek grave-markers that blame "envious demons" for robbing a young child of its life.

=== Legend of Saint Sisinnios ===
The story of St. Sisinnios assisting his sister Melitene against the demon Gyllou occurs in a group of different texts (These are also the texts in which Gyllou is compelled to reveal its "twelve and a half names"). These have been variously referred to as the "historiola" where in "the Greek tradition the woman is usually called Melitene",Spier (1993), p. 36 or "Melitine charm", or "Melitene type of Gylou story", or gello exorcism texts. The text group has been analyzed by Richard P. H. Greenfield in 1989, with the oldest example from a 15th century manuscript.

In the 15th-century manuscript version, the tale is set in the time of "Trajan the King". After losing six children to the Gyllou, Melitene gives birth to a seventh child inside a fortification she built at Chalcopratia (a part of the Constantinople). When her brothers, Sisinnios, Sines, and Sinodoros demand admittance, the "filthy" Gyllou (Note: "μιαρά Γυλλοῦ") gains entry by transforming into a fly clinging to the horse, and kills the child. The saints pray and an angel appears who instructs them to pursue the Gyllou to Lebanon. The Saints compel the demon to bring back to life all of Melitene's children, which the demon accomplishes after obtaining the mother's milk from Melitene. The saints continue to beat Gyllou, who begs mercy in return for revealing that she could be kept away with a charm inscribed with the names of the saints and with all of her different names. Then she proceeds to divulge her "twelve and a half names" (although what is meant by a "half name" is unclear):

My first and special name is called Gyllou; the second Amorphous; the third Abyzou; the fourth Karkhous; the fifth Brianê; the sixth Bardellous; the seventh Aigyptianê; the eighth Barna; the ninth Kharkhanistrea; the tenth Adikia; (…) (Note: There is a lacuna in the original text.) the twelfth Myia; the half Petomene.

A different version of this story was given by Leo Allatius in the 17th century. (Note: This version is cited by Perdrizet (1922), pp. 19 as text c, which Perdrizet counts as one of five texts of the "twelve and a half names" he is aware of.)

==== The names of Gello ====
Knowledge of a demon's name was required to control or compel it; a demon could act under an alias. Redundant naming is characteristic of magic charms, "stressing," as A.A. Barb noted in his classic essay "Antaura", "the well-known magic rule that the omission of a single one can give the demons a loophole through which they can work their harm."

In the aforementioned Leo Allatius version of the Legend of St. Sisinnos, the twelve-and-a-half names are given as Gylo, Morrha, Byzo, Marmaro, Petasia, Pelagia, Bordona, Apleto, Chomodracaena, Anabardalaea, (Note: Anabardalaea is also given as a name of Abyzou on a Byzantine amulet; Spier (1993), p. 30.) Psychoanaspastria, Paedopniktria, and Strigla. (Note: The names are transliterated as Gylou, Morra, Byzou, Marmarou, Petasia, Pelagia, Bordona, Apletou, Chamodrakaina, Anabardalaia, Psychanospastria, Paidopniktria and Strigla in Ryan, William Francis (1999), The Bathhouse at Midnight: An Historical Survey of Magic and Divination in Russia, Penn State Press, p. 246.) Although magic words (voces magicae) have often been corrupted in transmission or deliberately exoticized, several of these names suggest recognizable Greek elements and can be deciphered as functional epithets: Petasia, "she who strikes"; Apleto, "boundless, limitless"; Paedopniktria, "child suffocator." Byzo is a form of Abyzou, abyssos 'the Deep', to which Pelagia ("she of the sea") is equivalent.

The names of Gylo also include Chomodracaena, containing drakaina 'female dragon'. In one text dealing with the gello, she is banished to the mountains to drink the blood of the drako; in another, she becomes a drako and in this form attacks human beings. In other texts, the child itself is addressed as Abouzin (Abyzou).

==== Legend of Saint Michael ====
In variant tellings, the role of St. Sisinnios is supplanted by the archangel Michael. A 15th-century manuscript versions exists for this as well:

The archangel Michael said to her, 'Where have you come from and where are you going?' The abominable one answered and said, 'I am going off to a house and, entering it like a snake, like a dragon, or like some reptile, I will destroy the animals. I am going to strike down women; I will make their hearts ache, I will dry up their milk … I will strangle [their] children, or I will let them live for a while and then kill them' … .

Although the name Gylou is not found on any surviving amulets, Michael is the adversary Gylou encounters most often in medieval Byzantine texts.

==== Parallels ====
Parallels to the lore of a child-killing demon forced to confess its secret names occur as historiola or folktales surrounding magic spells, in medieval manuscripts of many languages, including Greek, Coptic, Ethiopian, Armenian, Romanian, Slavonic, Arabic, Syriac, and Hebrew.

The earliest examples, dating to the 5th or 6th century are the Aramaic versions of the historiola found as long inscriptions on objects: a silver lamella (metal-leaf sheet) from Palestine and two incantation bowls. In these Aramaic examples, the demon bears the name Sdrws (or Sideros, which in Greek would mean 'iron'), and the female victim whose twelve sons are taken is called Smamit ('lizard' or 'spider'). This reading is considered to be corroborated by the name of the female demon in the Ethiopian version, Werzelya, which also means "iron". The Ethiopian tradition explains that Werzelya was the evil sister of the Saint Sūsenyōs (which Budge identifies as Sisinnios), and the saint sought out to kill her.

== Church attitudes and actions ==
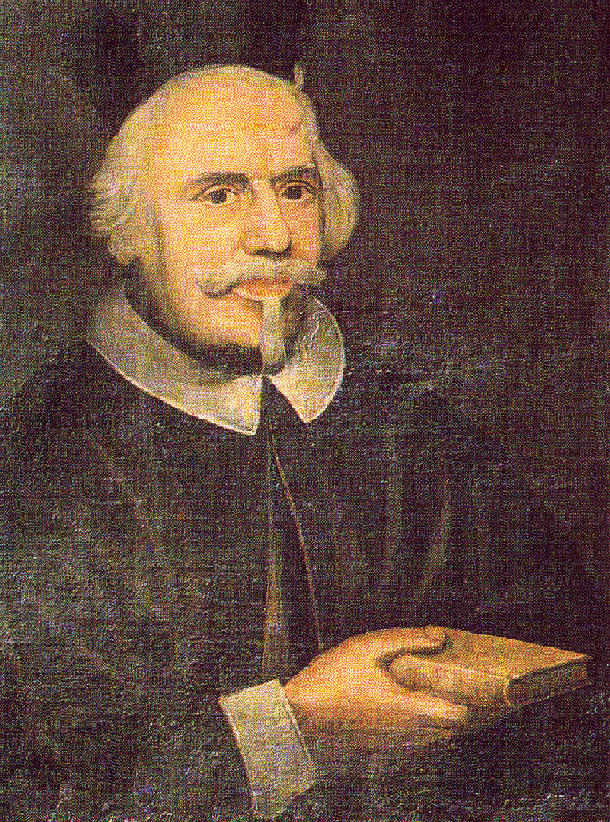
Leo Allatius collected beliefs pertaining to Gello

In his Life of Tarasius, Ignatios the Deacon of the ninth century recounts an actual case in which two women were charged as gelloudes and brought before the father of Tarasios of Constantinople, who acquitted them.

The psychological aspects of Gello were observed also by Leo Allatius in his work De Graecorum hodie quorundam opinionibus ("On the beliefs of the Greeks today"). Textual sources he collected on the Gello included Sappho's poem, the Suda, exorcisms, a church history, the Life of Tarasios, and proverbs. Allatios's purpose was to demonstrate the continuity of customs and morals, but also to show that these beliefs distorted or ran contrary to Christian doctrine. Sometimes the acts characteristic of Gello were attributed to "poor and miserable old crones," who could be accused in court as gelloudes and might even claim or confess to have acted as such.

A different penance was prescribed gelloudes, distinguished from infanticides in the Nomocanons of the 17th century theologian Jean-Baptiste Cotelier. Michael Psellos, however, rejected the notion that human beings could transform into demonic beings, and so there would be no need for a particular penance; the official position of Orthodoxy was that such creatures did not exist.

Despite her official non-existence, the gello is named in exorcisms, which required the attendance of a priest, and in prayer formularies. The Virgin Mary is invoked against the child-harming demon gylo:

Therefore I pray, my Lady, for your swiftest aid, so that the children of these your servants N and N may grow up, (Note: "N" in ancient and medieval prayers and magic spells stands for nomen, "name"; here the parents' names would be inserted.) and that they may live and give thanks in the sight of the Lord for all the days of their lives. Thus let it be, my Lady. Listen to me, a sinner and unworthy servant and although I am a sinner, do not despise my poor and miserable prayer but protect the children of your servants and let them live and send the Angel of Light so that he may protect and defend them from all evil, from wicked spirits, and from fiends which are in the air, and do not let them be singled out by other [demons] and by the accursed gylo lest harm comes to them and their children.

In one exorcism of the gello, no fewer than 36 saints are invoked by name along with Mary and the "318 Saints of the Fathers", with a final addendum of "all the saints." Some prayers resemble magic spells in attempting to command or compel the saints, rather than humbly requesting aid. Exorcisms emphasize that Christian families deserve exclusive protection. Gello continued to be named in exorcisms into the 20th century.

The old church regarded childbirth involving blood as impure, and a newborn had to wait several days before it could be baptized, while its mother could not rejoin the community for much longer. At this time, the child was considered at greater risk in the birth mother's sphere of influence, as she would be likely to attract female demons seeking blood.

In the story of Melitene, sister of the saints Sisinnios and Sisynodorus, the child is in peril until it is "returned" to the hands of men. In one version, the gello swallows the child and must be forced by the male saints to regurgitate it alive. This cycle – death by swallowing, regurgitation, new life – may be symbolized in initiation ceremonies such as baptism, which marked the separation of the child from the taint of its mother's gello-attracting blood.

== Modern folklore ==
The Greek folk belief continued into the modern era.

One exorcism text dating from around the turn of the 19th–20th century gives Baskania as a name for the gello as well as for the evil eye.

== Modern fiction and popular culture ==
- Gyllou is featured in a major text of modern Luciferianism, a belief system that venerates Lucifer. In The Bible of the Adversary by Michael W. Ford, she is associated with Lilith and represents Vampyrism as a desire for eternal life.
- Gello (here spelled "Gilou") is the primary antagonist of Jessie D. Eaker's short story The Name of the Demoness, featured in the sixth Sword and Sorceress anthology. She appears as a dog-headed woman with snakes for fingers who steals newborn babies, and her many names are a major plot point.
- The "gylou" or "handmaiden devil" is an all-female species of devil in the Pathfinder Roleplaying Game. They are also known as "Maids of Miscarriage" and are noted to particularly hate babies.
- Gello is an item in the indie roguelike game The Binding of Isaac: Rebirth's DLC, The Binding of Isaac: Repentance, as a familiar.

== List of related demons ==
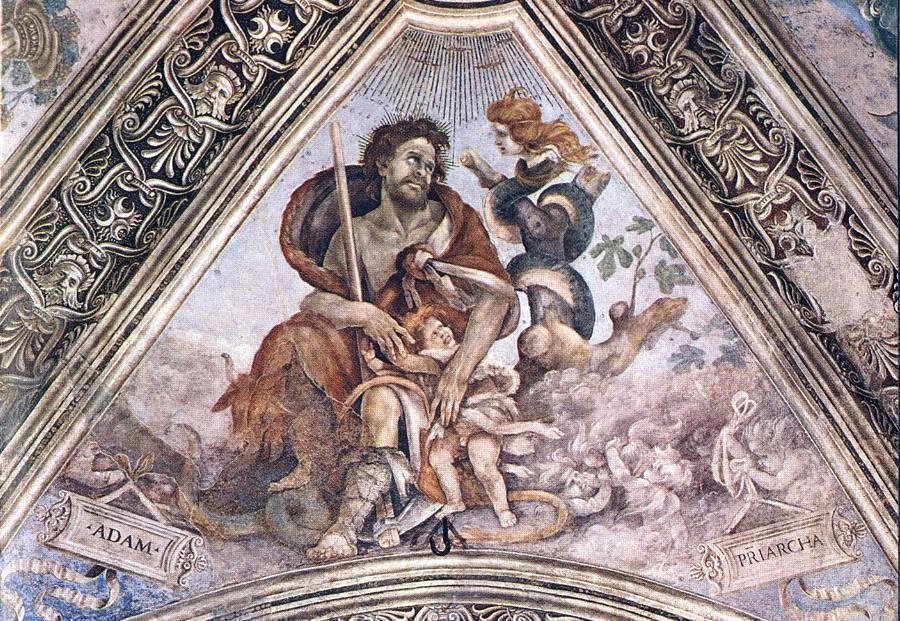
Adam clutches a child in the presence of the child-snatcher Lilith

Scholarly discussions of Gello associate her with and analyze the meaning of her narrative traditions in relation to the following demons and supernatural beings:

- Abyzou
- Empusa
- Gallu
- Lamia
- Lilith
- Mormo
