= Linus (mythology) =

Topics referred to by the same term

In Greek mythology, Linus (Ancient Greek: Λῖνος Linos "flax") may refer to the following personages:

Male

- Linus, an Arcadian prince as one of the 50 sons of the impious King Lycaon, either by the naiad Cyllene, Nonacris, or Pausanias. These brothers mixed the entrails of a child into Zeus' meal, whereupon the enraged god threw the meal over the table. Linus was killed, along with his brothers and their father, by a lightning bolt cast by Zeus.
- Linus, the great musician son of Apollo
- Linus, son of Apollo and Psamathe
- Linus, a soldier in the army of the Seven against Thebes. He was killed by Hypseus at Thebes.
