= Coroebus (disambiguation) =

Coroebus (Greek: Κόροιβος) may refer to:

- Coroebus of Phrygia, who came to aid Troy in the Trojan War
- Coroebus (Argos), slayer of Poene, the personification of punishment sent upon Argos by Apollo
- Coroebus of Elis, a champion of the Olympiade
- Coroebus, an Irish-bred racehorse
- Coroebus of Thebes, a defender against the Seven Against Thebes, killed by Parthenopaeus.
