= Dusios =

Celtic divine being

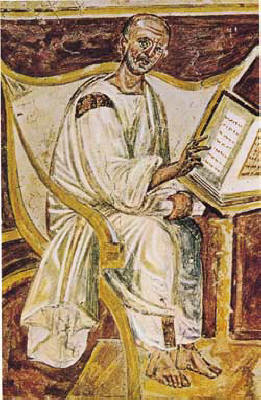
St. Augustine in a 6th-century portrait

In the Gaulish language, Dusios was a divine being among the continental Celts who was identified with the god Pan of ancient Greek religion and with the gods Faunus, Inuus, Silvanus, and Incubus of ancient Roman religion. Like these deities, he might be seen as multiple in nature, and referred to in the plural (dusioi), most commonly in Latin as dusii. Although the Celtic Dusios is not described in late-antique sources independently of Greek and Roman deities, the common functionality of the others lay in their ability to impregnate animals and women, often by surprise or force. Dusii continue to play a role in the magico-religious belief systems of Gaul and Francia as a type of incubus in early-medieval paganism and Christianity.

== In Augustine and Isidore ==
References to the dusii appear in the writings of the Church Fathers, where they are treated as demons. Early Christian writers still regarded the traditional religions of antiquity as potent competing belief systems. Rather than denying the existence of rival gods, they often sought to demonstrate their inferior nature through theological argument, ridicule, or demonization. Saint Augustine mentions the dusii in a passage criticizing the belief that early in the history of humanity angels could have bodily intercourse with mortal women, begetting the race of giants or heroes. Augustine redefines traditional beliefs within a Christian framework, and in this passage makes no firm distinction between the essential nature of angels and demons:

One often hears talk, the reliability of which must not be doubted, since it is confirmed by a number of people who know from their own or others' experience, that Silvani and Pans, commonly called incubi, have often appeared to women as wicked men, trying to sleep with them and succeeding. These same demons, whom the Gauls name Dusii, are relentlessly committed to this defilement, attempting and achieving so many things of such a kind that to deny it would seem brazen. Based on this, I dare not risk a definitive statement as to whether there might be some spirits, aerial in substance (for this substance, when it is set in motion by a fan, is perceived as sensation within the body and as touch), who take bodily form and even experience this sexual desire, so that, by any means they can, they mingle with women sensually. But that the holy angels of God in no way fell in like manner during that era — that I would believe.

Isidore of Seville echoes Augustine closely, but expands the identifications with other divine figures:

The 'hairy ones' (pilosi) are called in Greek Pans, in Latin Incubi, or Inui from their entry (ineundo) with animals everywhere. Hence also Incubi are so called because wrongful sex is incumbent on them. For often the wicked ones come into the presence of women also, and succeed in sleeping with them. The Gauls call these demons Dusii, because they seduce relentlessly.

Isidore seems to be trying to derive dusius from the adverb adsidue, "persistently, diligently, constantly." The word may be related to Scandinavian Tusse, "fairy." More likely, it is related to a semantic field of Indo-European words, some meaning "phantom, vapor," as for example Lithuanian dvãse, "spirit, phantom," and dùsas, "vapor"; and others meaning "fury" (Old Irish dás-, "to be in a fury"), particularly in a divine sense, as Greek thuia, "bacchante," and Latin furiae (the Furies). It is also possible, but less likely, that the word is a nominalization of the Gaulish prefix dus-, "bad" (cf. Greek dys-). Whitley Stokes connected the dusii to Slavic dusi ("spirits"), dusa ("soul"), dusmus ("devil"). The Breton word duz, a type of fairy, goblin, or changeling, is derived by many scholars from dusios. Duz sometimes has been proffered as the origin of deuce as a name for "devil" in the expression "What the Deuce!"

== Agricultural associations ==
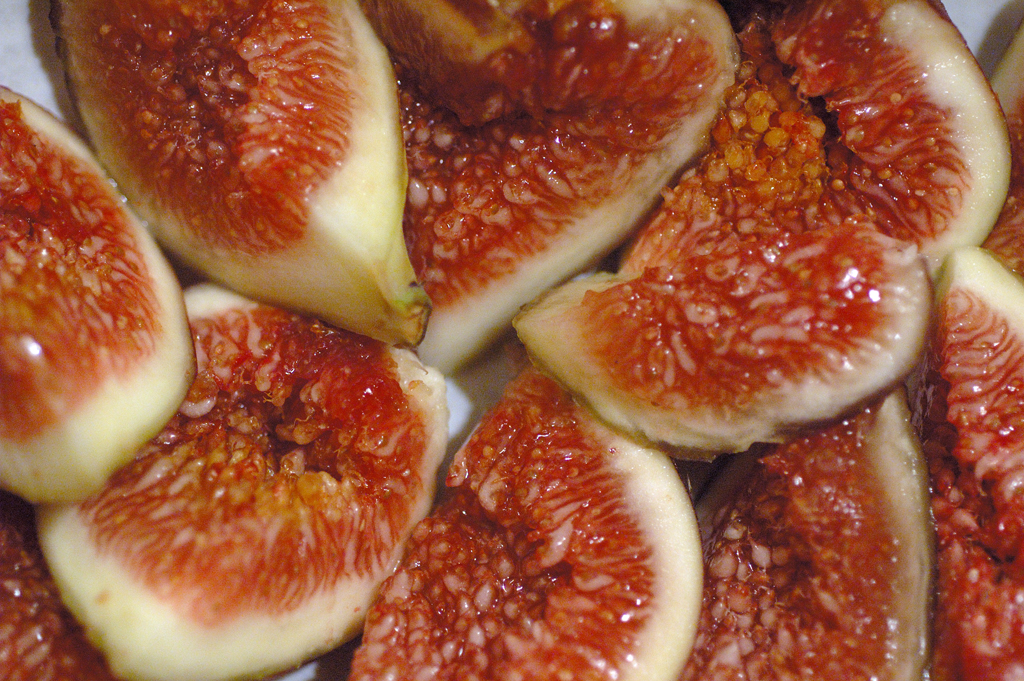
Figs, interior exposed

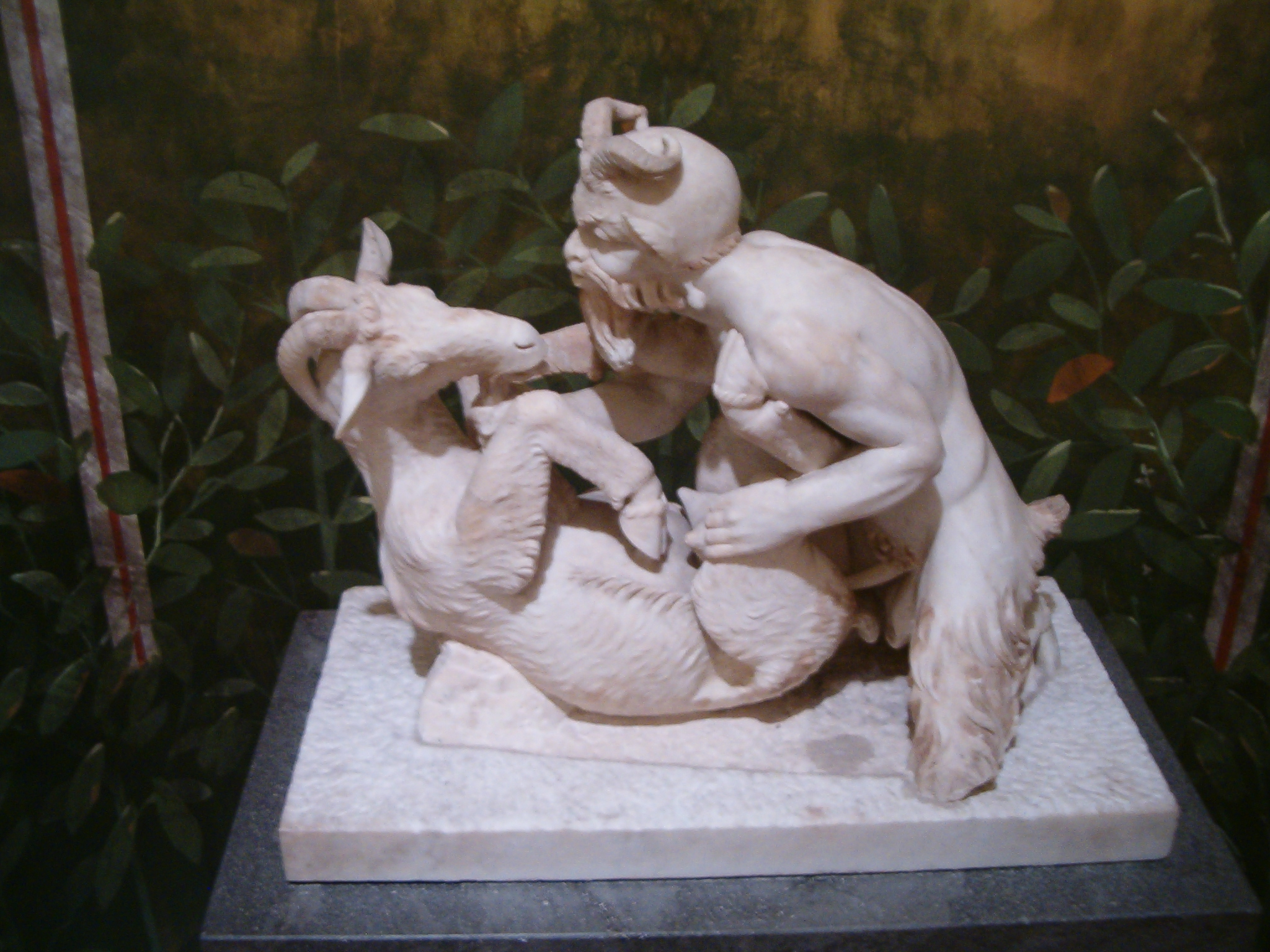
The Dusios was identified with Pan (pictured), Faunus, Silvanus, and Inuus as a rampantly fertilizing god

The lexicographer Papias, writing in the 1040s, says that the Dusii are those whom the Romans call Fauni ficarii. The adjective ficarius comes from ficus, "fig," and is applied to Faunus frequently enough to suggest a divine epithet. "Figgy" may refer to the god's fructifying power, or may be a lewd reference to the fauns' well-known habits of random penetration (see also Inuus), as "fig" was Greek slang for "anus" and Latin slang for both "sore anus" and later "vagina". A fertility ritual involving twigs and sap from the male fig tree was carried out by Roman matrons for Juno Caprotina, later identified with the goatskin-wearing Juno Sospita.

Pliny notes that the wild fig (called caprificus, "goat-fig, caprifig," because it was food for goats) spawns "flies" or fig wasps called ficarii (ficarios culices caprificus generat). The adjective ficarius characterizes the "figgy fauns" and their counterparts the dusii by their swarming, serial acts of fertilization.

In the 8th-century Life of St. Richarius, dusii hemaones or dusii manes also occur in a horticultural setting. Richarius, born ca. 560 in Amiens, Picardy, was converted to Christianity by Welsh missionaries. His vita records a belief among his fellow Picards in northern Gaul that the dusi, called maones in some recensions, steal crops and damage orchards. These agriculturally dangerous beings appear in other medieval authors as Mavones, maones, manes and "Magonians," the latter being airborne crop-raiders from a mythical land located in the clouds.

It is less than evident how dusii could be a surviving form of the Roman Manes, infernal gods who were shades of the dead, or be thought of as aerial pirates. Isidore offers a clue when he says the manes are gods of the dead, but their power is located between the Moon and the Earth, the same cloud region through which the Magonians traveled. This airborne existence recalls Augustine's characterization of the Dusii as "aerial in substance," and points toward the Arthurian "histories" involving incubi daemones, "creatures who mingle the angelic and the demonic, inhabiting the uncertain space between sun and moon." Medieval romance narratives suggest that women fantasize about these sexual encounters, though a visitation is likely to be represented by male authors as frightening, violent, and diabolic.

== Surviving tradition ==
Dusii are among the supernatural influences and magical practices that threaten marriages, as noted by Hincmar in his 9th-century treatise De divortio Lotharii ("On Lothar's divorce"): "Certain women have even been found to have submitted to sleeping with Dusii in the form of men who were burning with love." In the same passage, Hincmar warns of sorceresses (sorciariae), witches (strigae), female vampires (lamiae), and magic in the form of "objects bewitched by spells, compounded from the bones of the dead, ashes and dead embers, hair taken from the head and pubic area of men and women, multicoloured little threads, various herbs, snails' shell and snake bits."

19th-century Prussian coat of arms depicting woodland "wild men"

The form Dusiolus, a diminutive, appears in a sermon with the beings aquatiquus (from aqua, "water") and Geniscus, possibly a form of the Roman Genius or the Gallic Genius Cucullatus whose hooded form suggested or represented a phallus. According to "country people" (rustici homines), these and witches (striae) threaten infants and cattle.

Gervase of Tilbury (ca. 1150–1228) deals with dusii in his chapter on lamiae and "nocturnal larvae". Although he draws directly on Augustine, calling the dusii incubi and comparing them to Silvanuses and Pans, he regards them as sexually threatening to both men and women.

The dusios merges later with the concept of the wild man; as late as the 13th century, Thomas Cantipratensis claimed dusii were still an active part of cult practice and belief. In his allegory on bees, Thomas declares that "we see the many works of the demon Dusii, and it is for these that the folk used to consecrate the cultivated groves of antiquity. The folk in Prussia still reckon that the forests are consecrated to them; they don't dare cut them down, and never set foot in them, except for when they wish to make sacrifice in them to their own gods." In the 17th century, Johannes Praetorius rather wildly conjectured that dusios ought to be drusios, connected to the god Silvanus and the woodlands and to the word "druid." The 19th-century Irish folklorist Thomas Crofton Croker thought the dusii were a form of woodland or domestic spirits, and deals with them in a chapter on elves.
