= Crotopus =

King of Argos in Greek mythology

Crotopus or Krotopos (Ancient Greek: Κρότωπος), in Greek mythology, was the eighth king of Argos.

== Family ==
Crotopus was the son of Agenor and father of Psamathe and Sthenelas.

== Mythology ==
According to myth, Crotopus condemned to death his own daughter Psamathe, after she gave birth to a child who was Apollo 's son. Crotopus's city of Argos was consequently punished by Apollo with a plague. There are various versions, but it is in Conon's account that the king must expiate this himself by self-exile:

Crotopus was a terrifying father to Psamathe, and she exposed the child, but the child was found and grew up as a shepherd's boy named Linus, until Crotopus's sheepdogs tore the boy apart. As Psamathe grieved over the loss of her child, Crotopus discovered about the secret child, and under the assumption she had acted like a harlot and was lying about Apollo, sentenced her to death. In retribution Apollo brought an unspecified plague (Greek: λοιμός loimos) upon Argos. (Note: Conon, Diēgēseis [Narratives] 19, summarized by Pache (2004), pp. 66–77 and Frazer (1898), III: p. 536.)

Festival for Linos

An oracle prescribed the veneration of the mother and child, and the Argives held a Festival of Argis (Lamb festival) during the month of Arneios, involving women and girls singing the dirge to Linus (Linos) and the ritualized killing of dogs.

Tripodiscium

Despite this, the plague persisted. The oracle was consulted once again, and this time Crotopus was to banish himself from his own city of Argos and found a city in the Megarid; Crotopus settled here, in the city which would be named Tripodiscium (Greek: Tripodiskion).

Variant tellings

Other versions, such as given by Pausanias and Statius interpolate the labors of a hero from Argos named Coroebus. In those versions, Apollo first sends a monster (called Poena (Note: Or Poinē, given by Pausanias. Left unnamed by Statius (Pache (2004), p. 70).) that snatches babies from the Argives. It is slain by this hero, who must then perform the penance of building the tripod city (which in Conon's version was carried out by Crotopus).

== Reign ==
According to Eusebius, Crotopus reigned for 21 years and during his time, Phaethon's burning of Ethiopia and Deucalion's flood in Thessaly occurred. Crotopus succeeded his uncle Iasus as King of Argos upon Agenor's death while Sthenelas, his son replaced him on the throne.

Regnal titles
| Preceded by Agenor | King of Argos | Succeeded by Sthenelās |

CROTOPUS' CHRONOLOGY OF REIGN ACCORDING TO VARIOUS SOURCES
| Kings of Argos | Regnal Years | | Castor | Regnal Years | | Syncellus | Regnal Years | Pausanias | Tatian |
|---|---|---|---|---|---|---|---|---|---|
| Precessor | 1525 | 46 winters & summers | Triopas | 1527 | 36 winters & summers | Triopas | 1525 | Agenor or Iasus | Triopas |
| Phoroneus | 1502 | 21 years | Crotopus | 1509 | 24 winters & summers | Crotopus | 1500 | Crotopus | Crotopus |
| Successor | 1481 | 11 years | Sthenelus | 1497 | 24 winters & summers | Sthenelus | 1475 | Sthenelas | Sthenelaus |

== Modern allusions ==
A species of butterfly, Euselasia crotopus is possibly named after him.
