= Abyzou =

Name of a female demon

In the folklore of the Near East and Europe, Abyzou is a female demon associated with miscarriages and infant mortality, motivated by envy over her own infertility. In Coptic Egypt, she is identified with Alabasandria, and in Byzantine culture with Gylou. In various texts surviving from the syncretic magical practice of antiquity and the Early Middle Ages, she is said to have many or virtually innumerable names.

Abyzou (also spelled Abizou, Obizu, Obizuth, Obyzouth, Byzou etc.) is pictured on amulets with fish- or serpent-like attributes. Her fullest literary depiction is from the compendium of demonology known as the Testament of Solomon, dated variously by scholars from as early as the 1st century CE to as late as the 4th.

== Origins ==
A.A. Barb connected Abyzou and similar female demons to the story of the primeval sea, Abzu, in ancient Mesopotamian religion. Barb argued that although the name "Abyzou" appears to be a corrupted form of the Greek ἄβυσσος ábyssos 'abyss',

The primeval sea was originally an androgyne or asexual, later dividing into the male Abzu (fresh water) and the female Tiamat (seawater, appearing as the Tehom in the Book of Genesis). The female demons, among whom Lilith is the best-known, are often said to have come from the primeval sea. In ancient Greek religion, female sea monsters that combine allure and deadliness may also derive from this tradition, including the Gorgons (who were daughters of the old sea god Phorcys), sirens, harpies, and even water nymphs and Nereids.

In the Septuagint, the Greek version of the Hebrew Bible, the word Abyssos is treated as a noun of feminine grammatical gender, even though Greek nouns ending in -os are typically masculine. Abyssos is equivalent in meaning to Abzu as the dark chaotic sea before Creation. The word also appears in the Christian New Testament, occurring six times in the Book of Revelation, where it is conventionally translated not as "the deep" but as "the bottomless pit" of Hell. Barb argues that in essence the Sumerian Abzu is the "grandmother" of the Christian Devil.

== In the Testament of Solomon ==
In the late antique Testament of Solomon, Abyzou (as Obizuth) is described as having a "greenish gleaming face with dishevelled serpent-like hair"; the rest of her body is covered by darkness. The speaker ("King Solomon") encounters a series of demons, binds and tortures each in turn, and inquires into their activities; then he metes out punishment or controls them as he sees fit. Put to the test, Abyzou says that she does not sleep, but rather wanders the world looking for women about to give birth; given the opportunity, she will strangle newborns. She claims also to be the source of many other afflictions, including deafness, eye trouble, obstructions of the throat, madness, and bodily pain. Solomon orders that she be chained by her own hair and hung up in front of the Temple in public view. The writer of the Testament appears to have been thinking of the gorgoneion, or the icon of the Medusa's head, which often adorned Greek temples and occasionally Jewish synagogues in late antiquity.

Envy is a theme in the Testament, and during his interrogation by the king, Beelzebub himself asserts that he inspires envy among humans. Among the succession of demons bound and questioned, the personification of Envy is described as headless, and motivated by the need to steal another's head: "I grasp in an instant a man's head ... and put it on myself." As with Envy's Sisyphean efforts to replace his head, Abyzou (Obizuth) cannot rest until she steals a child each night.

== On medical amulets ==
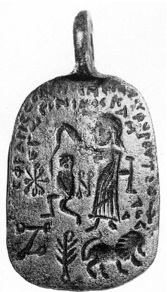
Amulet depicting Abyzou whipped by Arlaph

On the inscribed healing amulets of the Near Eastern and Graeco-Roman magico-medical tradition, illness or affliction is often personified and addressed directly; the practitioner may be instructed to inscribe or chant a phrase that orders the ailment to depart: for example, "Flee, Fever!" The ailment may also be conceived of as caused by a demon, who must be identified correctly by name and commanded to depart. In this mode, magico-healing practice bears comparison to exorcism.

Abyzou is depicted and named on several early Byzantine bronze amulets. With her hands tied behind her back, she kneels as she is whipped by a standing figure, identified as Solomon or Arlaph, called Afarof in the Testament of Solomon and identified with the archangel Raphael. On one amulet, the figure is labeled as Arlaph, but an inscription reads "The Seal of Solomon [is] with the bearer; I am Noskam." The reverse inscription is written within an ouroboros, the symbol of a snake biting its tail to form a circle: "Flee, flee, Abyzou, [from] Sisinios and Sisinnia; the voracious dog dwells here." (Saint Sisinnios sometimes takes the Solomon role on Christian amulets.) Although Abyzou is regarded mainly as a threat to child-bearing women and to infants, some of the names of those seeking protection from her on extant amulets are masculine.

Medieval amulets show a variation on this iconography, with Abyzou trampled underfoot by a horseman. The rider is identified again either as Solomon or Arlaph; one example depicts the rider as Sisinnios, with the demon named as both Abizou and Anabardalea, and an angel named Araph (for Arlaph) standing by with one raised wing. The medieval lead amulets that show the rider subduing the female often have a main image that resembles a gorgoneion and is likely a womb symbol (hystera).

== Names ==
In one magic-related text, the archangel Michael confronts Abyzou and compels her to tell him the 40 names that can control her. In magico-religious practice, the knowledge of the secret name of a deity, divine force, or demon offers power over that entity.

In the Testament of Solomon, the demon herself declares that she has ten-thousands of names and forms, and that Raphael is her antithesis. She says that if her name is written on a scrap of papyrus when a woman is about to give birth, "I shall flee from them to the other world."

Variants on the name of Abyzou appear frequently in charms in languages such as ancient Greek, Hebrew, and Romanian.

=== Gyllou, Gylou, Gello ===
The female childbirth demon appears frequently in magical texts under her Babylonian name Gyllou or Gylou. In one Greek tale set in the time of "Trajan the King", Gyllou under torture reveals her "twelve and a half names":

My first and special name is called Gyllou; the second Amorphous; the third Abyzou; the fourth Karkhous; the fifth Brianê; the sixth Bardellous; the seventh Aigyptianê; the eighth Barna; the ninth Kharkhanistrea; the tenth Adikia; ... the twelfth Myia; the half Petomene.

In medieval texts, one of Gylou's twelve and a half names is given as Anabardalea, a name also associated with Abyzou.

In the form of Gello, the demon appears in a fragment from Sappho's poetry.

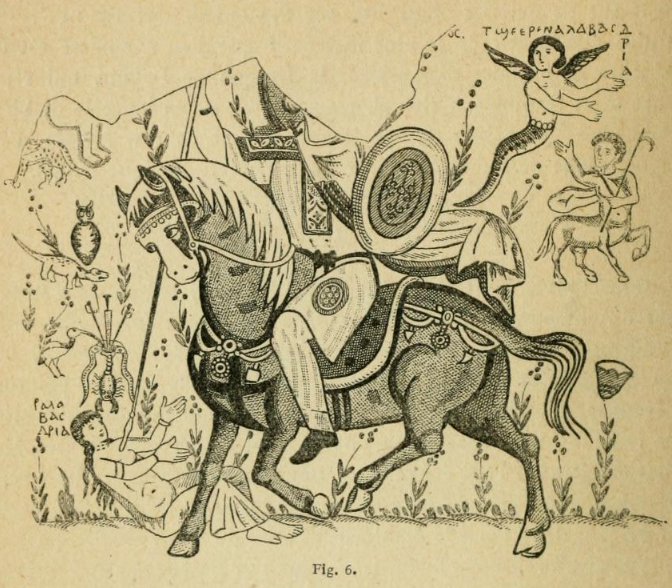
Fresco unearthed at Bawit. The mounted figure is identified as Sissinios (only "os" remains to be read); the trampled female is Alabasandria. The winged half-serpent is "daughter of Alabasandria".

=== Antaura ===
Antaura is a female demon who causes migraine headaches. She is known primarily from a 2nd/3rd century silver lamella (inscribed metal leaf) found at the Roman military settlement Carnuntum in present-day Austria. Antaura, whose name means something like "Contrary Wind", is said to come out of the sea. In the inscription, she is confronted by the Ephesian Artemis, who plays the role assigned to the male figures Solomon, Arlaph, and Sisinnios in Jewish and Christian texts.

=== Alabasandria ===
At the monastery of St. Apollo in Bawit, Egypt, a wall painting depicts the childbirth demon under the name Alabasandria (or Alabasdria) as she is trampled under the hooves of a horse. The rider wears a belted tunic and trousers in the Parthian manner, and an inscription, now faded, was read at the time of its discovery as Sisinnios. This central image is surrounded by other figures, including a centaur, the piercing of the evil eye, and the demon's daughter, winged and reptile-tailed, identified by an inscription.

== In popular culture ==
- In the 2012 horror film The Possession, Abyzou is the name of the dybbuk that haunts one of the main characters, Emily "Em" Brenek.
- In "The Sisters Mills", an episode of the Fox fantasy series Sleepy Hollow, Abyzou is featured as the primary antagonist. Here she is the origin of the myth of the Tooth Fairy.
- In the 2023 horror film The Offering (also marketed as Abyzou), Abyzou is the main antagonist.
- In the 2026 horror film Undertone, Abyzou becomes the primary focus of the main character, Evy. Abyzou is first introduced in the film when Evy opens her Wikipedia page.

== See also ==
For similar or related figures, see:

- Al
- Empusa
- Estries
- Lamashtu
- Lamia
- Lilin
- Lilith
- Shedim

== Selected bibliography ==
- Barb, A.A. "Antaura. The Mermaid and the Devil's Grandmother: A Lecture". Journal of the Warburg and Courtauld Institutes 29 (1966) 1–23.
- Conybeare, F.C. "The Testament of Solomon", translation and introduction. Jewish Quarterly Review 11 (1898) 1– 46 online, full text available and downloadable.
- Fulgum, Mary Margaret. "Coins Used as Amulets in Late Antiquity". In Between Magic and Religion (Rowman & Littlefield, 2001), pp. 139–148 limited preview online.
- Spier, Jeffrey. "Medieval Byzantine Magical Amulets and Their Tradition". Journal of the Warburg and Courtauld Institutes 56 (1993) 25–62, online.
