= Geniscus =

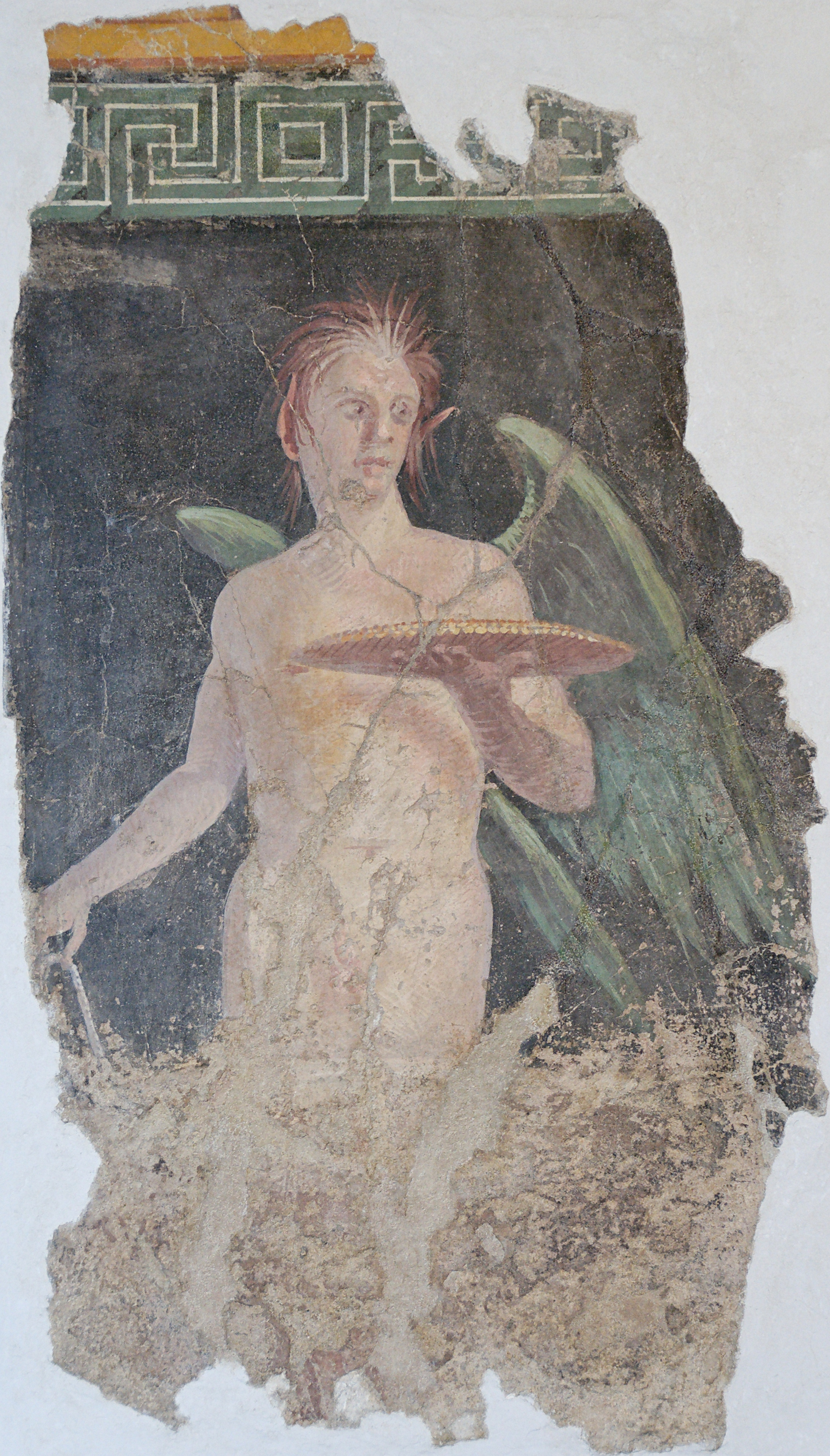
The late-antique Geniscus may be a form of the Roman Genius, pictured here in a 1st-century BC wall painting

Geniscus (/ɡɛˈniːs.kʊs/) is a deity who appears in a sermon of Saint Eligius along with Neptune, Orcus, Minerva and Diana. These are all, the Christian homilist says, "demons" who should not be believed in or invoked. The warning implies cult activity for these deities in the northern parts of Merovingian Gaul into the 7th century.

Geniscus may be a form of reference to the Genius, the Roman tutelary deity; in Gaul, the Genius is often hooded (Genius Cucullatus) and appears either singly or in a group of three.

In another sermon in the same period, the Geniscus appears in the company of witches (striae) and other entities in whom "rustics" believe:

There are some country people (rustici homines) who have a belief in certain women, because it is commonly said that they must be witches and able to harm infants and cattle, and the Dusiolus or Aquatiquus or Geniscus must too.

== 19th century ==
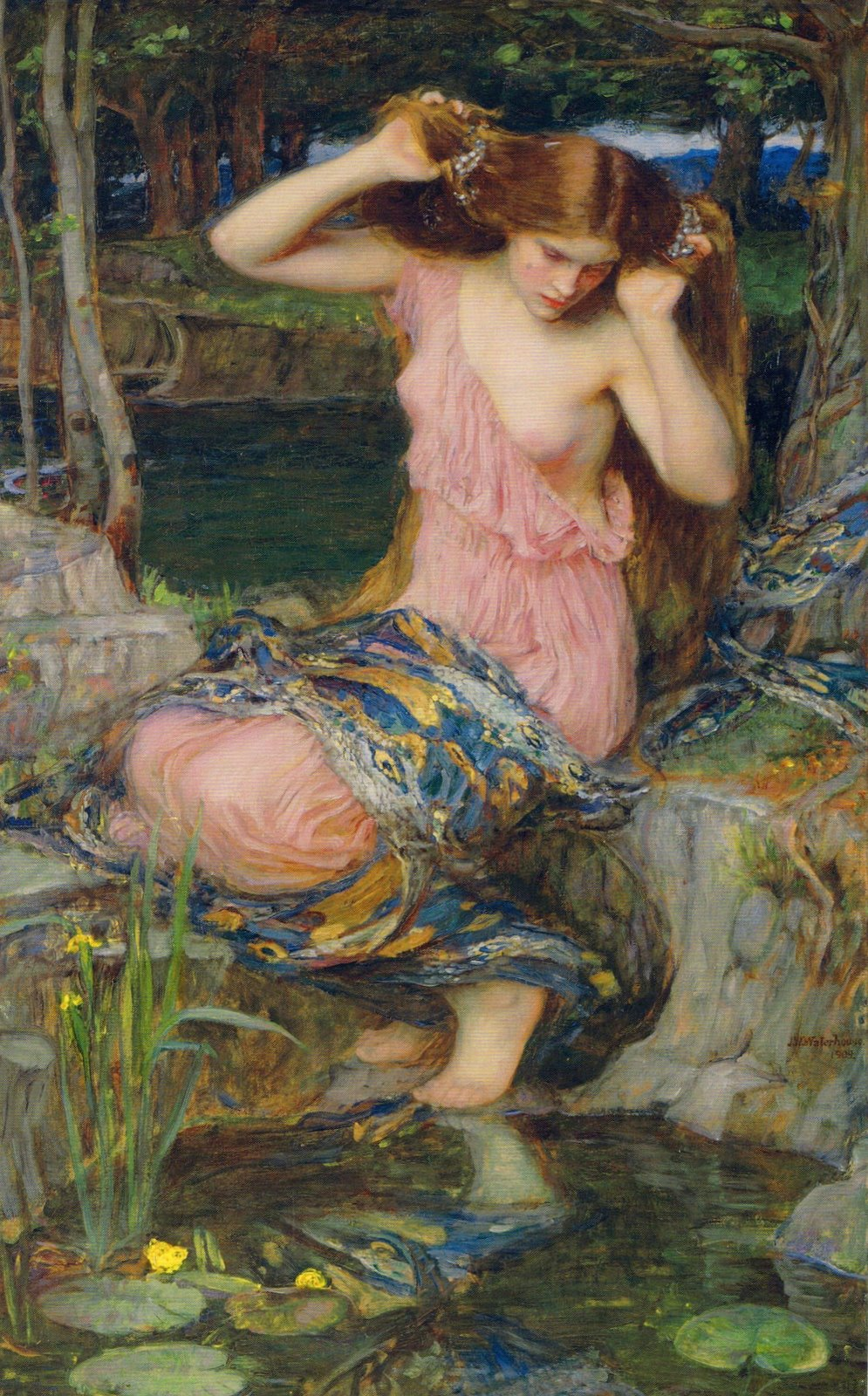
Pre-Raphaelite version of the lamia by John William Waterhouse

The 19th-century fascination for folklore, antiquarianism, the supernatural, and lost religions drew attention to even the obscure Geniscus. The Irish folklorist Thomas Crofton Croker accepted a derivation of geniscus from Latin genius and in his chapter on elves declared the geniscus "a real Elf, or spirit of light." Croker further connected geniscus to the geniciales feminae named by Hincmar, a 9th-century archbishop of Reims, who identified the geniciales as lamiae. During the same period Jacob Grimm classed the geniciales among the "daemonic elvish beings, who appeared in woman's shape and did men kindnesses," and who participated in elf-dance: "To christian zealots all dancing appeared sinful and heathenish, and sure enough it often was derived from pagan rites, like other harmless pleasures and customs of the common people, who would not easily part with their diversion at great festivals." Grimm connects these dances to bonfires.

Geniscus is mentioned in the 1876 historical fiction Dante and Beatrice from 1282 to 1290: A Romance by Elizabeth Kerr Coulson, writing under the pseudonym Roxburghe Lothian. Coulson recounts at length the Christian prohibitions that a friar called The Hermit must enforce, then segues into practices deemed tolerable:

He had to stop people from keeping the day of rats and mice; a day which, with many similar remnants of paganism, the Church had forbidden, although she had been pleased to appoint Saint Gertrude of Nivelle, as the patroness of their destruction. He was also bound to decry the old reverence for ash trees, which reverence was a relic of the pagan Solstitia. He would tolerate no June fires, on the even of St John, neither any dancing around them. But, on the other hand, there were minor customs of the lowliest of the poor which he tolerated. Such were the lighting of small cressets to float on streams and fountains, to prevent their drying up (which same were of old offerings to the Naiads and Potamides); hanging of wreaths of vervain round the necks of beasts to keep adders from them; placing of sprigs of box over cottage doors; wearing pieces of amber for Minerva, and strange amulets against Ouragus, the old god of death, and his helper Geniscus; treasuring of red pebbles, found in the marsh-lands, in lap-wings' nests. These, and many more customs of the same kind, he found ineradicable, and was fain to tolerate patiently.

Whether she used the Vita of St. Eligius directly or another source such as Croker, Coulson preserves the collocation of Geniscus with Minerva and Orcus (here Ouragus). She either innovates or draws on traditions pertaining to the cult of the Genii by making Geniscus the "helper" of Orcus.
