= Breath of life =

Breath of life may refer to:

== Medicine and philosophy ==
- Prana, or life force, in Vedantic philosophy
- Pneuma (Stoic), in Stoic philosophy
- Pneuma (ancient medicine)
- A concept in biodynamic osteopathy and craniosacral therapy

== Film ==
- Breath of Life (1963 film), a British film of 1963
- Breath of Life (1990 film), an Italian drama film
- Breath of Life (1991 film), a British short film
- Breath of Life (2023 film), a Nigerian film

== Literature ==
- The Breath of Life (play), a 2002 play by David Hare
- A Breath of Life, a novel by Brazilian author Clarice Lispector

== Music ==
- The Breath of Life (band), a Belgian rock band
- Breath of Life (Louis Hayes album) or the title track, 1974
- Breath of Life (Magnum album) or the title song, 2002
- Breath of Life (World Saxophone Quartet album) or the title song, 1994
- "Breath of Life" (Erasure song), 1991
- "Breath of Life" (Florence and the Machine song), 2012
- "Breath of Life", a song from the Lord of the Rings: The Two Towers film soundtrack, 2002

== Other uses ==
- Breath of Life (language restoration workshops), in Native American communities

== See also ==
- Pneuma (disambiguation)
