= A Libyan Myth =

Speech-fragment by Dio Chrysostom

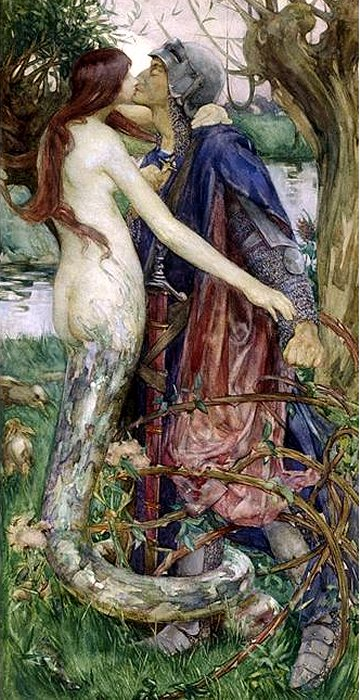
The Kiss of the Enchantress (Isobel Lilian Gloag, c. 1890), a depiction of Lamia which resembles the monster of A Libyan Myth in appearance and behaviour.

A Libyan Myth (Ancient Greek: Λιβυκὸς Μῦθος, romanized: Libykos Mythos, Oration 5 in modern corpora) is a short speech or speech-fragment by Dio Chrysostom, telling the story of a mythical creature from Libya, perhaps Lamia, as an allegory for human passions, especially lust. The work is also important for an understanding of Dio's ideas about myth as allegory. It is debated whether the work is a stand-alone speech or an alternative ending to On Kingship IV.

== Attribution and background ==
A Libyan Myth begins and ends abruptly, with a short introduction and no conclusion. In On Kingship IV (73), Dio writes:

[Diogenes of Sinope said] "Haven't you heard the Libyan myth?" and [Alexander the Great] said that he had not heard it, so then Diogenes recounted it enthusiastically and charmingly, wishing to encourage him, just as nannies do with children, when they give them a smack, and then encourage and please them by recounting a myth.

— Dio, Oration 4 (On Kingship IV) 73.

The text of the myth does not actually appear in On Kingship IV, but context indicates that it is the same story as in A Libyan Myth. Accordingly, Hans von Arnim, editor of Dio's works suggested that A Libyan Myth was originally written as an alternative ending to On Kingship IV and subsequently turned into an independent work with the addition of a short preface. He attributed this to Arethas of Caesarea. This theory is still considered possible, but not proven.

Rudolf Hirzel believed that the myth had been entirely invented by Dio. However, several ancient authors refer to "Libyan myths" as a genre of fable, associated particularly with Cybissus of Libya and the title given to the work implies that Dio expected the tale to be recognised as falling within that genre.

== Summary ==
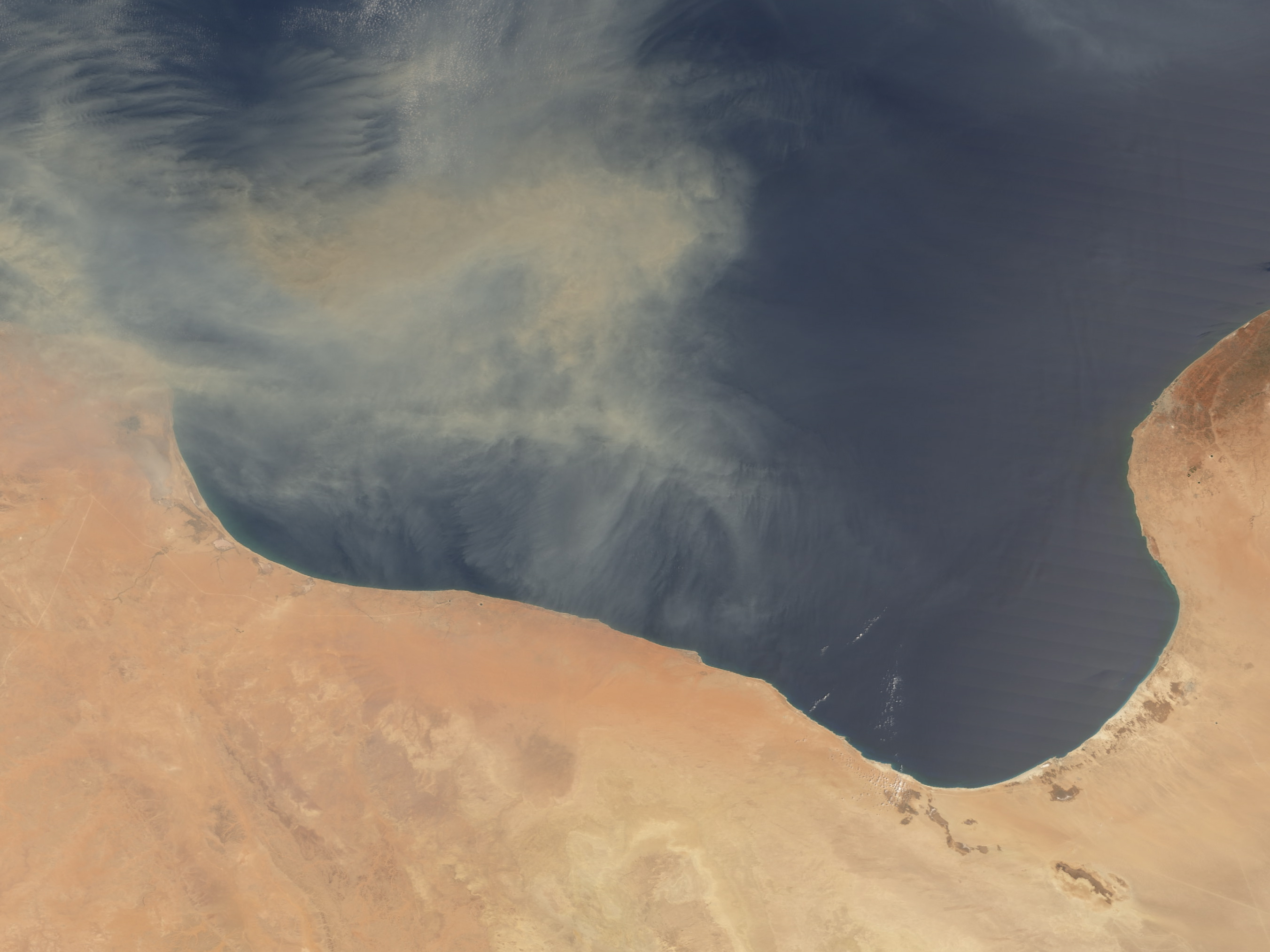
Syrtis, the modern Gulf of Sidra in Libya, the setting of A Libyan Myth.

The work begins with a short prologue (1-4) explaining that myths can be useful and beneficial, when they have allegorical meanings added to them, like fruit-bearing branches grafted onto a barren plant. Dio claims that the Libyan myth is an allegory for human passions (epithymiai). The rest of the work consists of three sections. The first section (5-17) describes the monster. Dio says that it lived on the shores of Syrtis in Libya and had the head, neck and breasts of a beautiful woman, with hidden claw-like hands and a scaly body, terminating in a tail with a snake's head at the end. It catches most of its prey by force, but humans through trickery, witchcraft, and lust (5-15). Although Dio does not use the name, this appears to be Lamia. Dio explains the allegorical meaning:

So then, this myth might perhaps be able to show sufficiently what kind of thing the passions are, namely that they are irrational and beastly, since by offering some pleasure or other and carrying the unintelligent off with trickery and witchcraft, they destroy them tragically and pitifully...

— Dio, Oration 5 (A Libyan Myth) 16.

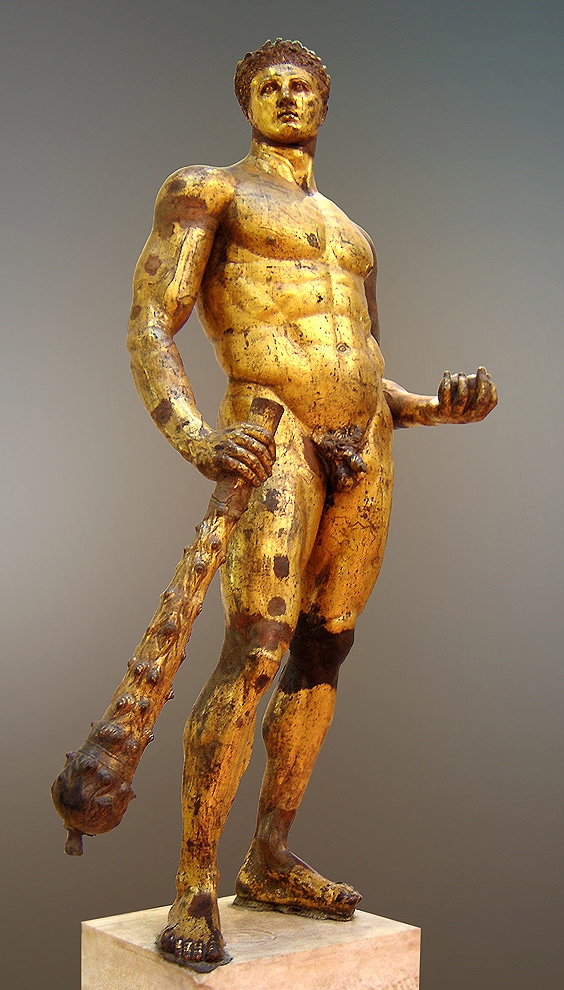
Gilded bronze statue of Heracles, 2nd century CE)

In the second section (18-23), Dio recounts two attempts to wipe out the monsters. In the first, an anonymous Libyan king leads an expedition to their nest and sets it on fire. The king and his army depart quickly, but after they make camp for the night, surviving monsters attack the camp and kill them all. Subsequently, however, Heracles successfully eliminates the monsters as part of his labours to "tame the Earth" (18-21). Once again, Dio explains the allegory, which is about the elimination of passion from an individual's soul, which is "like a forbidding land full of difficult monsters." Most people make only a passing effort to purify their souls of passion and are then destroyed, like the Libyan king, when their passions remerge. A few manage to truly "tame" their souls, as Heracles tamed the Earth (22-23).

In the third and final section (24-27), Dio recounts a final part of the myth, apparently set in historical times, "to entertain the younger men" or "to entertain from the more recent stories" (24). According to Dio, a group of Greeks travelling through the Libyan desert with an armed escort to visit the Oracle of Ammon at Siwah caught sight of a Libyan woman partially buried in the sand. Two young men take her for a local hetaera (courtesan), but "putting her snake part forward" she kills them, leaving behind a corpse which rapidly putrefies. The Libyan guides of the expedition refuse to allow the other Greeks to touch this corpse, "so that they would not all be killed." The text breaks off abruptly, without explaining the meaning of this portion of the myth. Interpretation of this final section is probably intended as an exercise for the reader.

== Analysis ==
Dio expresses a sceptical attitude towards myth, dismissing myth as useless, except perhaps if used allegorically for moral instruction. This posture seems to be derived from Plato, who rejects attempts to rationalise myth (that is to find a "kernel of truth" in them) as a waste of time in Phaedrus 229c-e, but frequently retells and invents myths as allegories for philosophical truths. Dio's presentation of the passionate part of the soul as a monster or "beast" (thērion) also seems to derive from Plato, who presents the irrational part of the soul "a variegated and many-headed beast" in an allegorical myth in book 9 of The Republic (588c). Dio's work includes close verbal parallels with both passages.

The representation of the Libyan landscape as inhospitable and dangerous is common in ancient Greek and Roman depictions of Libya, which Dio explains to be a metaphor for the human soul. In particular Heracles' taming of the taming of the landscape represents his successful taming of his own soul. The same allegorical interpretation of Heracles' journey through Libya appears in Apollonius of Rhodes' Argonautica (4.1235-49), and Herodorus of Heraclea's late-fifth or early fourth-century history of Heracles (fragment 17). Dio's work includes a very close verbal parallel with Herodorus' account and Dio presents Heracles as a model of the Cynic sage in other works, such as Diogenes or On Virtue. The same tradition lies behind the account of Cato the Younger's journey through the Libyan desert in book 9 of Lucan's De Bello Civili, generally understood as (serious or parodic) allegory for the Stoic effort to overcome vice and passion.

Dio's myth has similarities with Lucian's The Dipsads and the episode of the "vine women" in his A True Story 1.6-9. Like Dio, Lucian emphasises that myth is untrue, and there are a number of structural and thematic similarities between the accounts, but Lucian does not claim that his stories reveal moral truths. It is likely that Lucian's accounts were inspired by A Libyan Myth, but they are not simple imitations.

Dio clearly distinguishes the third and final part of the myth from the earlier parts: it is apparently set in historical time, the monster reappears despite Heracles having wiped them all out in the second section, and the account is presented without an allegorical explanation. The reappearance of the monster may indicate that each individual must tame the landscape of their soul anew. Richard Hunter suggests, alternatively, that the narrative implies that the monster in this part is meant to be a mirage and that the two men are killed by a snake bite, noting that the description of the putrefied body is similar to Greek literary descriptions of death by snakebite. He proposes that Dio uses the contrast to suggest that myths arise from our own mental states and expectations; the Greeks interpret the event as an encounter with the monster, because in the wilderness they expect to find it.

== Editions ==
- von Arnim, Hans (1893–1896). Dionis Prusaensis quem uocant Chrysostomum quae exstant omnia. Berlin: Wiedmann.
- Cohoon, J. W. (1932). Dio Chrysostom, I, Discourses 1–11. Princeton: Harvard University Press, Loeb Classical Library. ISBN 9780674992832.

== Bibliography ==
- Resnick, Irven M.; Kitchell, Kenneth F. Jr. (2007). "The Sweepings of Lamia: Transformations of the Myths of Lilith and Lamia". Religion, Gender, and Culture in the Pre-Modern World. Springer. pp. 77–105. ISBN 9780230604292.
- Fagih, Ahmed (2008). The Libyan Short Story: A Research and Anthology. Xlibris Corporation. ISBN 978-1-4691-0039-5.
- Georgiadou, Aristoula; Larmour, David H. J. (1997). "Lucian's Vine-Women (VH 1,6-9) and Dio's Libyan Women (Orat. 5): Variations on a Theme". Mnemosyne. 50 (2): 205–209. doi:10.1163/1568525972609906. ISSN 0026-7074. JSTOR 4432710.
- Hunter, Richard (2017). "Serpents in the Soul: The 'Libyan Myth' of Dio Chrysostom". In Hawes, Greta (ed.). Myths on the map : the storied landscapes of ancient Greece. Oxford: Oxford University Press. pp. 281–298. ISBN 9780198744771.
- Leigh, Matthew (2000). "Lucan and the Libyan Tale". The Journal of Roman Studies. 90: 95–109. doi:10.2307/300202. ISSN 0075-4358. JSTOR 300202. S2CID 162570463.
- Said, Suzanne (2002). "Dio's Use of Mythology". In Swain, Simon (ed.). Dio Chrysostom: Politics, Letters, and Philosophy. Oxford University Press. pp. 161–186. ISBN 978-0-19-925521-4.
- Stafford, Emma (2013). Herakles. Routledge. ISBN 978-1-136-51926-0.
- von Arnim, H. (1891). "Entstehung und Anordnung der Schriftensammlung Dios von Prusa". Hermes. 26: 366–407.
- Whitmarsh, Tim (2001). Greek literature and the Roman empire: the politics of imitation. Oxford: Oxford University Press. ISBN 0199240353.
