= Inuus =

Roman god

Inuus (Classical Latin: [ˈɪnuʊs]) was a god, or aspect of a god, who embodied sexual intercourse in ancient Roman religion. The evidence for him as a distinct entity is scant. Maurus Servius Honoratus wrote that Inuus is an epithet of Faunus (Greek Pan), named from his habit of intercourse with animals, based on the etymology of ineundum, "a going in, penetration," from inire, "to enter" in the sexual sense. Other names for the god were Fatuus and Fatuclus (with a short a).

Walter Friedrich Otto disputed the traditional etymology and derived Inuus instead from in-avos, "friendly, beneficial" (cf. aveo, "to be eager for, desire"), for the god's fructifying power.

== Lupercalia ==
Livy is the sole source for identifying Inuus as the form of Faunus for whom the Lupercalia was celebrated: "naked young men would run around venerating Lycaean Pan, whom the Romans then called Inuus, with antics and lewd behavior." Although Ovid does not name Inuus in his treatment of the Lupercalia, he may allude to his sexual action in explaining the mythological background of the festival. When Romulus complains that a low fertility rate has rendered the abduction of the Sabine women pointless, Juno, in her guise as the birth goddess Lucina, offers an instruction: "Let the sacred goat go into the Italian matrons" (Italidas matres … sacer hirtus inito, with the verb inito a form of inire). The would-be mothers recoil from this advice, but an augur, "recently arrived from Etruscan soil," offers a ritual dodge: a goat was killed, and its hide cut into strips for flagellating women who wished to conceive; thus the aetiology for the practice at the Lupercalia. Rutilius Namatianus offers a similar verbal play, Faunus init ("Faunus enters"), in pointing out a statue depicting the god at Castrum Inui ("Fort Inuus"). Georg Wissowa rejected both the etymology and the identification of Inuus with Faunus.

The scant evidence for Inuus has not been a bar to elaborate scholarly conjecture, as William Warde Fowler noted at the beginning of the 20th century in his classic work on Roman festivals. "It is quite plain," Fowler observed, "that the Roman of the literary age did not know who the god (of the Lupercalia) was."

== Castrum Inui ==
Servius's note on Inuus is prompted by the mention of Castrum Inui at Aeneid 6.775:

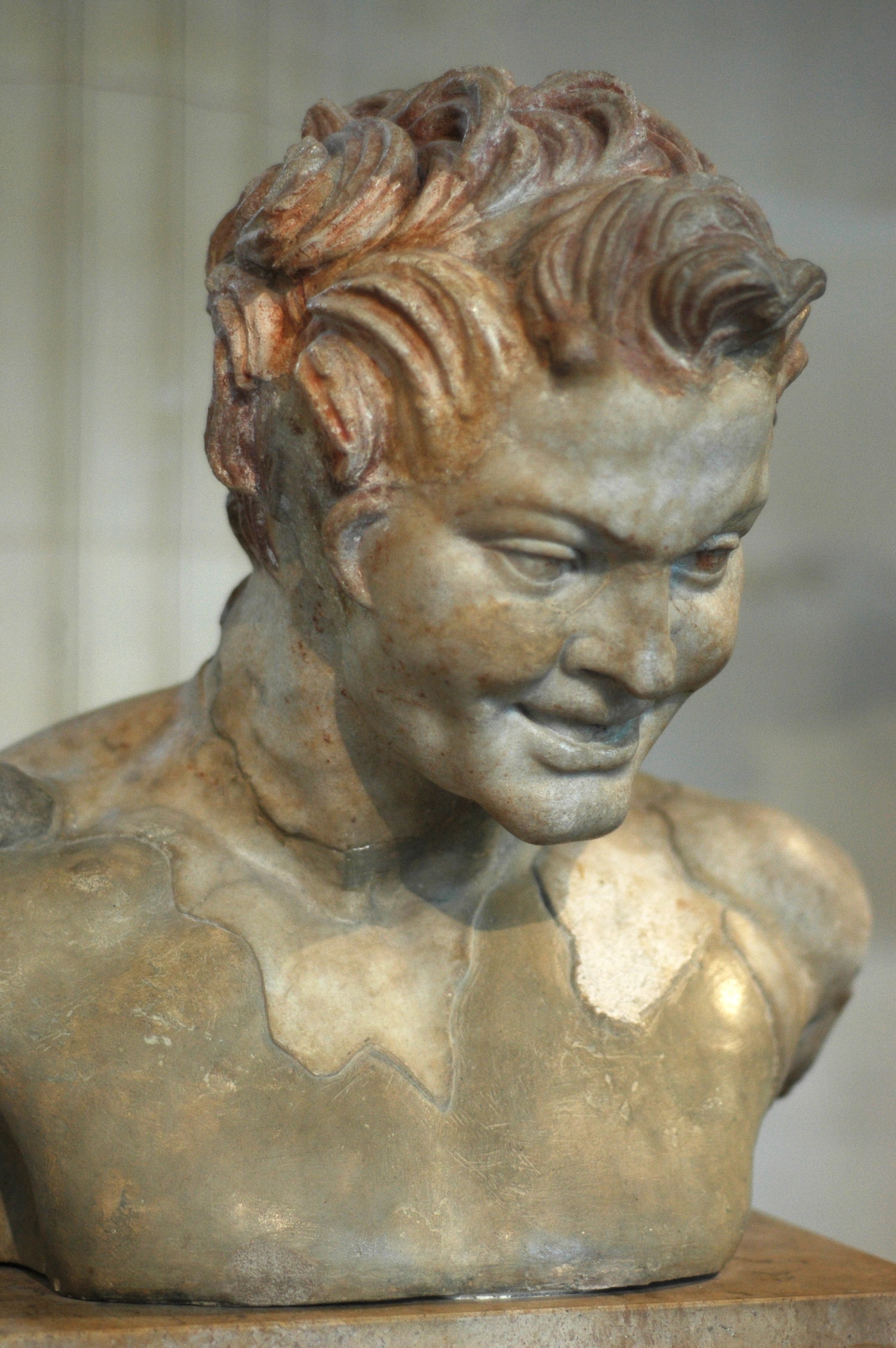
A Roman imperial bust of Faunus.

This is one and the same as the town (civitas) in Italy which is called New Fort (Castrum Novum). Vergil says 'Fort Inuus' for the place, that is, 'Fort Pan', who has a cult there. He is called Inuus, however, in Latin, Πάν (Pan) in Greek; also Ἐφιάλτης (Ephialtes), in Latin Incubus; likewise Faunus, and Fatuus, Fatuclus. He is called Inuus, however, from going around having sex everywhere with all the animals, hence he is also called Incubus.

Castrum Novum is most likely Giulianova on the coast of Etruria, but Servius seems to have erred in thinking that Castrum Inui, on the coast of Latium, was the same town.

Rutilius makes the same identification as Servius but explains that there was a stone carving of Inuus over the gate of the town. This image, worn by time, showed horns on its "pastoral forehead", but the ancient name was no longer legible. Rutilius is noncommittal about its identity, "whether Pan exchanged Tyrrhenian woodlands for Maenala, or whether a resident Faunus enters (init) his paternal retreats," but proclaims that "as long as he revitalizes the seed of mortals with generous fertility, the god is imagined as more than usually predisposed to sex."

== Other associations ==
The Christian apologist Arnobius, in his extended debunking of traditional Roman deities, connects Inuus and Pales as guardians over flocks and herds. The woodland god Silvanus over time became identified with Faunus, and the unknown author of the Origo gentis romanae notes that many sources said that Faunus was the same as Silvanus, the god Inuus, and even Pan. Isidore of Seville identifies the Inui, plural, with Pan, incubi, and the Gallic Dusios.

Diomedes Grammaticus makes a surprising etymological association: he says that the son of the war goddess Bellona, Greek Enyo (Ἐνυώ), given in the genitive as Ἐνυοῦς (Enuous), is imagined by the poets as goat-foot Inuus, "because in the manner of a goat he surmounts the mountaintops and difficult passes of the hills."

== Casuccini mirror ==
An Etruscan bronze mirror from Chiusi (ca. 300 BCE), the so-called Casuccini mirror, may depict Inuus. The scene on the back is a type known from at least four other mirrors, as well as engraved Etruscan gems and Attic red-figure vases. It depicts the oracular head of Orpheus (Etruscan Urphe) prophesying to a group of figures. Names are inscribed around the edge of the mirror, but because the figures are not labeled individually, the correlation is not unambiguous; moreover, the lettering is of disputed legibility in some names. There is general agreement, however, given the comparative evidence, that the five central figures are Umaele, who seems to act as a medium; Euturpa (the Muse Euterpe), Inue (Inuus), Eraz, and Aliunea or Alpunea (Palamedes in other scenarios). The lovers in the pediment at the top are Atunis (Adonis) and the unknown E…ial where Turan (Venus) would be expected. The figure with outstretched wings on the tang is a Lasa, an Etruscan form of Lar who was a facilitator of love like the Erotes or Cupid.

The bearded Inuus appears in the center. Damage obscures his midsection and legs, but his left arm and chest are nude and muscled. On an otherwise very similar mirror, a spear-bearing youth replaces Inuus in the composition. No myth that would provide a narrative context for the scene has been determined.

== Darwinian connection ==
Charles Darwin used the nomenclature Inuus ecaudatus in writing of the Barbary macaque, now classified as Macaca sylvanus. Charles Kingsley wrote to Darwin in January 1862 speculating that certain mythological beings may represent cultural memories of creatures "intermediate between man & the ape" who became extinct as a result of natural selection:

I want now to bore you on another matter. This great gulf between the quadrumana & man; & the absence of any record of species intermediate between man & the ape. It has come home to me with much force, that while we deny the existence of any such, the legends of most nations are full of them. Fauns, Satyrs, Inui, Elves, Dwarfs — we call them one minute mythological personages, the next conquered inferior races — & ignore the broad fact, that they are always represented as more bestial than man, & of violent sexual passion. … The Inuus of the old Latins is obscure: but his name is from inire — sexual violence.
