= Mormo =

Greek mythical character

Mormo (Greek: Μορμώ, Mormō) was a female spirit in Greek folklore, whose name was invoked by mothers and nurses to frighten children to keep them from misbehaving.

The term mormolyce /mɔːrˈmɒlɪˌsiː/ (μορμολύκη; pl. mormolykeia μορμολύκεια), also spelt mormolyceum /mɔːrˌmɒlɪˈsiːəm/ (μορμολυκεῖον mormolukeîon), is considered equivalent.

== Etymology ==
The name mormo has the plural form mormones which means "fearful ones" or "hideous one(s)", and is related to an array of words that signify "fright".

The variant mormolyce translates to "terrible wolves", with the stem -lykeios meaning "of a wolf".

== Description ==
The original Mormo was a woman of Corinth, who ate her children then flew away, according to an account only attested in a single source. (Note: Scholios to Aristides (Dindorf, p. 41)) Mormolyca /mɔːrˈmɒlɪkə/ (as the name appears in Doric Greek: μορμολύκα) is designated as the wetnurse (Greek: τιθήνη) of Acheron by Sophron (fl. 430 BC). (Note: Sophron frag. 9, ed. Kaibel.)

Mormo or Moromolyce has been described as a female specter, phantom, or ghost by modern commentators. A mormolyce is one of several names given to the female phasma (phantom) in Philostratus's Life of Apollonius of Tyana. (Note: An empousa, or lamia, she is also called in the work.)

Mormo is glossed as equivalent to Lamia and mormolykeion, considered to be frightening beings, in the Suda, a lexicon of the Byzantine Periods. Mombro (Μομβρώ) or Mormo are a bugbear (φόβητρον phóbētron), the Suda also says.

"Mormo" and "Gello" were also aliases for Lamia according to one scholiast, who also claimed she was queen of the Laestrygonians, the race of man-eating giants. (Note: Scholios to Theocritus Idylls 15.40.)

=== Bugbear ===
The name "Mormo" or the synonymous "Mormolyceion" was used by the Greeks as a bugbear or bogey word to frighten children.

Some of its instances are found in Aristophanes. The poet Erinna, in her poem The Distaff, recalls how her and her friend Baucis feared Mormo as children.

Mormo as an object of fear for infants was even recorded in the Alexiad written by a Byzantine princess around the First Crusade.

=== Modern interpretations ===
A mormo or a lamia may also be associated with the empusa, a phantom sent by the goddess Hekate.
