= Pneuma (disambiguation) =

Pneuma is an ancient Greek word for "breath", and in a religious context for "spirit" or "soul."

Pneuma may also refer to:

- Pneuma (journal), a theological journal of the Society for Pentecostal Studies
- Pneuma (film), a 1983 avant-garde film by Nathaniel Dorsky
- Pneuma: Breath of Life, a 2015 video game by Deco Digital & Bevel Studios
- Pneuma, a character from Xenoblade Chronicles 2

== Music ==
- Pneuma (Moving Mountains album), 2007
- Pneuma (Michael White album), 1972
- Pneuma (record label), a Spanish early music label
- Pneuma Recordings, a drum and bass record label based out of San Francisco, USA
- Pneuma (band), a thrash metal band from Costa Rica
- "Pneuma" (song), a song by Tool, from the album Fear Inoculum

== See also ==
- Pneumatology, the study of spiritual beings and phenomena
- Pneumatics, the study and application of use of pressurized gas to effect mechanical motion
- Pneumology, another name for pulmonology, medical specialty dealing with the respiratory tract
- Breath of life (disambiguation)
