= Sarah Iles Johnston =

American historian

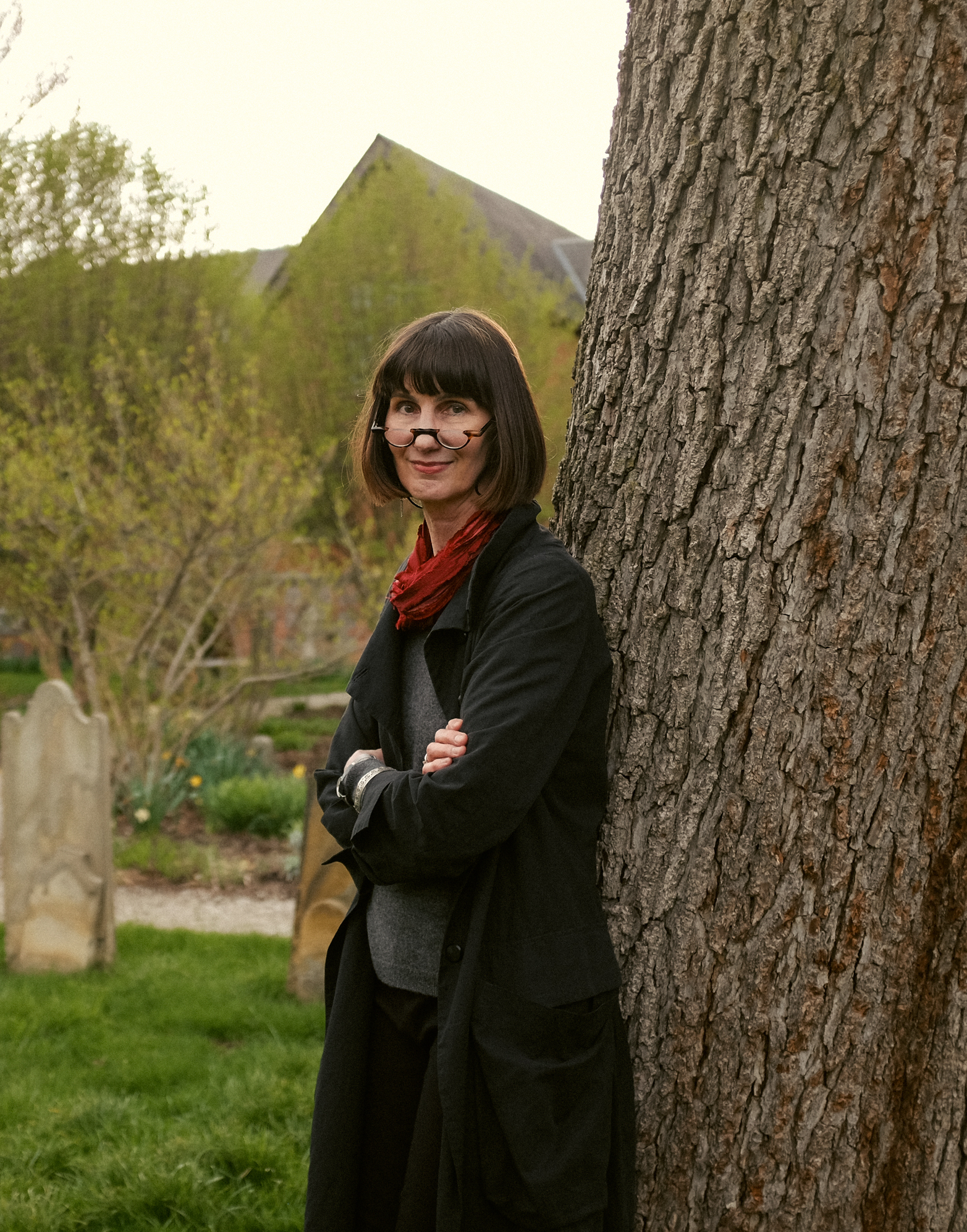
- Sarah Iles Johnston
- Born: 25 October 1957 (age 68); Bowling Green, OH
- Occupations: College of Arts and Sciences Distinguished Professor of Religion

Academic background
- Education: University of Kansas, Cornell University

Academic work
- Discipline: Religious Studies, Classics
- Sub-discipline: Comparative study of religions and myths, Ancient Greek myths and religion
- Institutions: Ohio State University

Sarah Iles Johnston (born 25 October 1957) is an American academic working at Ohio State University, studying and publishing on ancient Greek myths and religion.

== Education ==
Johnston attended the University of Kansas where she received her B.S. in Journalism in 1979, followed shortly by her B.A. in Classics in 1980. She then attended Cornell University, where she also worked as a teaching assistant, to complete her M.A. in Classics in 1983 and her PhD in 1987, where she studied ancient Greek myths and religions.

== Career ==
Johnston began her teaching career proper when she accepted the post of lecturer in Classics at Princeton University, where she worked from 1987 to 1988. Since then, she has held a number of positions at Ohio State University, including assistant professor of Classics (1988–1995), associate professor of Greek and Latin (1995–2000) and professor of Greek and Latin (2000–). In 2011 she was named the Arts and Humanities Distinguished Professor of Religion at Ohio State, and in 2017 she was named the College of Arts and Sciences Distinguished Professor of Religion. She holds a professorship in Ohio State's Department of Classics.

She was the founding director of the Center for the Study of Religion at Ohio State (2006–2010).

Her scholarly books include The Story of Myth (2018), Ancient Greek Divination (2008), Ritual Texts for the Afterlife: Orpheus and the Bacchic Gold Tablets (2007, with Fritz Graf), Restless Dead: Encounters Between the Living and the Dead in Ancient Greece (1999) and Hekate Soteira (1990). Additionally, she has also been an editor for a number of collections, including Narrating Religion (2017), Religions of the Ancient World: A Guide (2004) and Ancient Religions (2007), and she has authored a number of articles and essays for Classical journals.

In 2023, her first book for the general public, Gods and Mortals: Ancient Greek Myths for Modern Readers, was published.

== Awards and fellowships ==
Johnston's awards and fellowships include:

- Fellow, Lichtenberg-Kolleg, Universität Göttingen, March 1-July 1, 2012.
- Senior ACLS Fellow and Visiting Fellow, Princeton Univ. Dep’t. of Classics, 1999/2000.
- Senior Fellow, Institute for the Advanced Study of Religion, University of Chicago, Fall 1997.
- Fellow, Fondation Hardt, Vandoeuvres, Switzerland, July–August 1996.
- Senior Fellow, Institute for Advanced Study, Princeton NJ, Spring 1995.

== Publications ==
=== Books ===
- Gods and Mortals: Ancient Greek Myths for Modern Readers (Princeton Univ. Press: 2023).
- The Story of Myth (Harvard Univ. Press: 2018).
- Ancient Greek Divination (Wiley-Blackwell: 2008).
- With Fritz Graf, Ritual Texts for the Afterlife: Orpheus and the Bacchic Gold Tablets (Routledge: 2007; second edition 2013).
- Restless Dead: Encounters Between the Living and the Dead in Ancient Greece (University of California Press: 1999).
- Hekate Soteira (Amer. Class. Studies #21) (Scholars' Press: 1990; now published by Oxford University Press).

=== Edited volumes ===
- Narrating Religion (MacMillan: 2017).
- Ancient Religions (Harvard University Press: 2007).
- Co-Editor (with Peter T. Struck) Mantikê: Studies in Ancient Divination. Religions in the Greco-Roman World. vol. 155 (Brill: 2005).
- Religions of the Ancient World: A Guide (Harvard University Press: 2004).
- Co-Editor (with James J. Clauss) Medea: Essays on Medea in Myth, Literature, Philosophy and Art (Princeton University Press: 1997).

=== Chapters and articles ===
- "The Religious Affordance of Supernatural Horror Fiction," Numen 70 (2023) 113-137.
- "Here Lies Hecate: Poetry and Immortality in 2nd-Century Mesembria," Archiv für Religionsgeschichte 24 (2022) 305-18.
- "Ancient Greek Tales of the Afterlife," in David Saunders, ed., Underworld: Imagining the Afterlife in Ancient Greek Vase Painting (Getty Museum: 2021).
- "Theurgy," in Guide to the Study of Ancient Magic, ed. David T. Frankfurter (Brill 2019).
- "Many (Un)Happy Returns: Ancient Greek Concepts of a Return from Death and their Later Counterparts," in Round Trip to Hades in the Eastern Mediterranean Tradition, eds. Gunnel Ekroth and Ingela Nilsson (Brill 2018) 356-69.

=== Other ===
- 2024 TEDx talk: Why Supernatural Horror Fiction Might Make You Think about God
