= Linus (son of Apollo) =

Figure in Greek mythology

In Greek mythology, Linus (Ancient Greek: Λῖνος Linos "flax"), son of Apollo and Psamathe, daughter of King Crotopus of Argos.

== Mythology ==
When Psamathe had given birth to Linus, fearing her father she thus exposed the child. Linus was found by shepherds, who brought him up but the child after reaching adulthood was torn to pieces by the shepherd's dogs. Psamathe's grief at the occurrence betrayed her misfortune to her father, who would not believe that she had had intercourse with a god rather than a mortal, and thus condemned her to death. Apollo, in his indignation at the father's cruelty, visited Argos with a child-killing plague and when his oracle was consulted about the means of averting the plague, he answered that the Argives must propitiate Psamathe and Linus. This was attempted by means of sacrifices, and matrons and virgins sang dirges which were called linoi, and the month in which this solemnity was celebrated was called arneios, and the festival itself arnis, because Linus had grown up among lambs. The pestilence, however, did not cease until Crotopus quitted Argos and settled at Tripodisium, in Megaris.

In an alternate version, the baby Linus was torn apart by the king's sheepdogs upon being exposed and Apollo sent Poene, the personification of punishment, upon the city. Poene would steal children from their mothers until Coroebus killed her. This caused a second punishment to fall upon the city that was devastated by plague.
