= Empusa =

Legendary figure in Greek mythology

Empusa or Empousa (/ɛmˈpjuːsə/; Ancient Greek: Ἔμπουσα; plural: Ἔμπουσαι Empusai) is a shape-shifting female being in Greek mythology, said to possess a single leg of copper, commanded by Hecate, whose precise nature is obscure. In Late Antiquity, the empousae have been described as a category of phantoms or spectres, equated with the lamiai and mormolykeia, thought to seduce and feed on young men.

== In antiquity ==
The primary sources for the empousa in Antiquity are Aristophanes's plays (The Frogs and Ecclesiazusae) and Philostratus's Life of Apollonius of Tyana.

=== Aristophanes ===
The Empusa was defined in the Sudas and by Crates of Mallus as a "demonic phantom" (Note: Phāntasma daimoniōdes (Greek: φάντασμα δαιμονιῶδες).) with shape-shifting abilities. Thus in Aristophanes's plays she is said to change appearance from various beasts to a woman.

The Empusa is also said to be one-legged, having one brass leg, (Note: Or of copper, or bronze (Greek: χάλκεος).) or a donkey's leg, thus being known by the epithets Onokole (Ὀνοκώλη) and Onoskelis (Ὀνοσκελίς), which both mean "donkey-footed". A folk etymology construes the name to mean "one-footed" (from Greek *έμπούς, *empous: en-, one + pous, foot).

In Aristophanes's comedy The Frogs, an Empusa appears before Dionysus and his slave Xanthias on their way to the underworld, although this may be the slave's practical joke to frighten his master. Xanthias thus sees (or pretends to see) the empousa transform into a bull, a mule, a beautiful woman, and a dog. The slave also reassures that the being indeed had one brass (copper) leg, and another leg of cow dung (Note: Or donkey dung; βόλιτος.) besides.

The Empusa was a being sent by Hecate (as one scholiast noted), or was Hecate herself, according to a fragment of Aristophanes's lost play Tagenistae ("Men of the Frying-pan"), as preserved in the Venetus. (Note: The Empusa/Hecate is said by Aristophanes to appear with coiled snakes in that summoned form.)

=== Life of Apollonius ===
By the Late Antiquity in Greece, this became a category of beings, designated as empusai (Lat. empusae) in the plural. It came to be believed that the spectre preyed on young men for seduction and for food.

According to the 1st-century Life of Apollonius of Tyana, the empousa is a phantom (phasma) that took on the appearance of an attractive woman and seduced a young philosophy student in order eventually to devour him. In a different passage of the same work, when Apollonius was journeying from Persia to India, he encountered an empousa, hurling insults at it, coaxing his fellow travellers to join him, whereby it ran and hid, uttering high-pitched screams.

An empousa was also known to others as lamia or mormolyke. This empousa confessed it was fattening up the student she targeted so that she could better feed on him, and that she especially craved young men for the freshness and purity of their blood, prompting an interpretation as blood-sucking vampire by Smith's Dictionary of Greek and Roman Biography and Mythology (1849). (Note: The "Apollonius of Tyana" article from the DGRBM′s 1877 edition also wrote that it was a "vampire", but in the 1880 edition the article renamed "Apollonius Tyanaeus" has "purposely omitted wonders".)

== Modern Greek folklore ==
In modern times, folklore has been collected about a being fitting the description of an empousa: an extremely slender woman with multiple feet, "one of bronze, one a donkey's foot, one an ox's, one a goat's, and one human", but she was referred to as a woman with the lamia-like body and gait. The example was from Arachova (Parnassus) and published by Bernhard Schmidt (1871). Schmidt only speculated that oral lore of empousa might survive somewhere locally. A field study (Charles Stewart, 1985) finds that empousa is a term that is rarely used in oral tradition, compared to other terms such as gello which has a similar meaning.

== In fiction ==
Empusa is a character in Faust, Part Two by Goethe. She appears during the Classical Walpurgis Night as Mephisto is being lured by the Lamiae. She refers to herself as cousin to Mephisto because she has a donkey's foot and he has a horse's.

== See also ==
- Vrykolakas
