= Heraclitus the Paradoxographer =

Heraclitus Paradoxographus (Greek: Ἡράκλειτος) is the author of the lesser-known of two works known as Peri Apiston (On Unbelievable Tales). Palaephatus was the author of a better-known work of paradoxography with the same title, mentioned more often in antiquity.

Heraclitus' Peri Apiston treats Greek mythology in the rationalizing manner that appealed to Christian apologists, in pithy language and thought. The text survives in a single 13th-century manuscript in the Vatican Library; it has minor imperfections, and it may well be a late Byzantine epitome of a longer work. Nothing is known of the author, although he appears to belong to the late 1st or 2nd century AD. He is unlikely to be any of the other men of the name of Heraclitus known from antiquity. The 12th-century Byzantine scholar and commentator on Homer, Eustathius of Thessalonica, is the only scholar who mentions him, as "the Heraclitus who proposes to render unbelievable tales believable".

The text includes thirty-nine items in which familiar myths are briefly recounted and explained. Heraclitus has four methods of explanation, all prominent in late Hellenistic and Roman interpretations: rationalization (that the myth represents a misunderstanding of a natural event), euhemerism, allegory, or fanciful etymology. All these techniques of exegesis were later adopted and developed by Christian theologians of Late Antiquity. Among extant mythology collections this text is of particular interest precisely because it exemplifies in brief compass, such a range of ancient strategies for the interpretation of myth.

In one notable example, Heraclitus rationalizes the three-headed Cerberus by suggesting it was simply a dog with two puppies that always walked alongside their father, creating the appearance of a three-headed creature.
