= Psamathe (daughter of Crotopus) =

Daughter of Crotopus in Greek mythology

In Greek mythology, Psamathe (Ancient Greek: Ψαμάθη) was the daughter of King Crotopus of Argos, who became the lover of the god Apollo.

== Mythology ==
According to the Narrations of the mythographer Conon, Psamathe became pregnant by Apollo, and abandoned the newborn boy, Linus, for fear of her father. A shepherd reared the foundling, but the child was one day torn apart by the shepherd's dogs. In the interim, Psamathe was ordered to be killed by her father. Apollo avenged her murder by sending a plague to Argos. When consulted, Apollo demanded that Psamathe and Linus be propitiated with due honors and festivities. The Argives complied but the plague persisted. And by oracular decree, the king was forced to leave in order to found the city of Tripodiscium near Megara, where he would live out his life.

In an alternate version (Pausanias), Psamathe exposed the unnamed child, which was torn apart by the king's sheepdogs. Apollo then sent Poena (Greek: Poinē), the personification of punishment, upon the city. Poine would steal children from their mothers until Coroebus killed her. A hero Coroebus emerged from Argos to slay it, but Apollo then brought a plague upon the city.

A version by Statius tells this story, but does not name Psamathe, whom he only records as Crotopos's daughter.

=== Monster ===
The monster is called also Poena, the personification of punishment, in Pausanias's version of the tale. It is a female monster with a snake protruding from her forehead in Statius's version, possibly having snake-feet (anguipedal form) as well.

The monster is also called a Kēr (Greek: Κήρ "death-demon") in one poem, (Note: Greek Anthology 7.154, quoted and translated by Pache (2004), pp. 72–73. Also cited as Palatine Anthology 7.154) and a late source (9th to 11th century) labels her as one of the Lamiai. It is also supposed to have a human head upon a serpent's body, according to a scholiast to Ovid. The poem indicates that the ker was entombed in the city of the tripod (Tripodiscium) to stand as a monument to commemorate Psamathe, and that its slayer Coroebus is interred right underneath the monster.

=== Coroebus, the Argive ===
Coroebus of Argos slew Poine, in Pausanias's version. Thereupon Apollo struck the city with a plague. Coroebus decided to go to Delphi to ask for punishment to befall only him, so that the city didn't have to suffer. The Pythia told him to never return home, but to take up a tripod and carry it until he would drop it, then settle on the spot where it would happen. The tripod slipped out of his hands as he had reached the Geraneian Mountains, where he founded a town known as Tripodiskoi ("Little Tripods"). The tomb of Coroebus was shown in Megara.

The hero named Coroebus does not appear in the version according to Conon.
