= Poena =

Attendant to Nemesis in Greek mythology

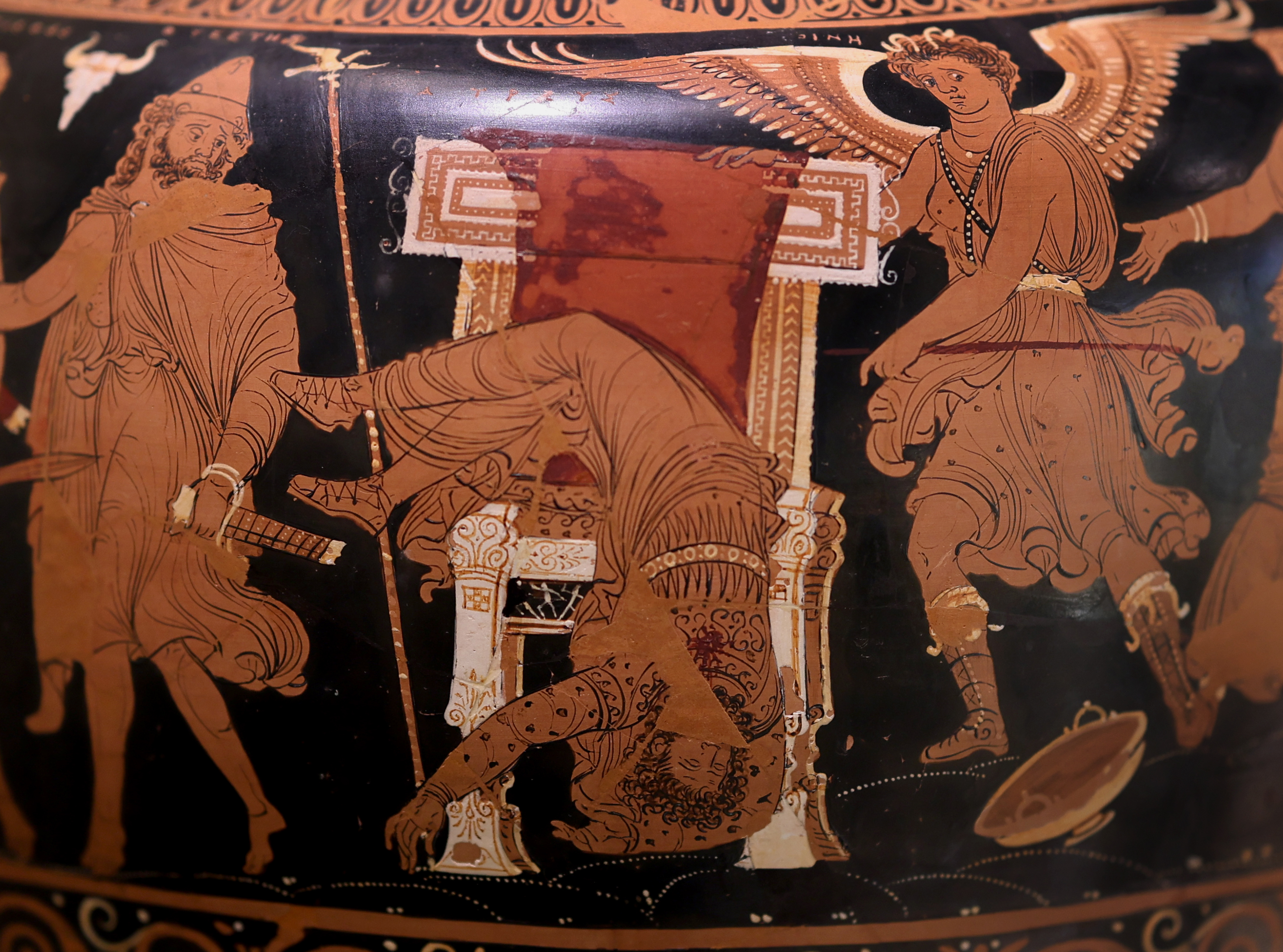
Winged Poena witnessing the murder of Atreus on a red-figure Apulian amphora by the Darius Painter, 4th-century BC.

In Greek mythology, Poena or Poine (Ancient Greek: Ποινή, romanized: Poinḗ, lit. 'recompense, punishment') is the spirit of punishment and the attendant of punishment to Nemesis, the goddess of divine retribution. Some depictions are of a single being, and some depictions are of multiple beings—in the plural, the name is Poenai (Ποιναί); the Poenai are akin to the Erinyes.

The Greek word ποινή (poinḗ) means "a recompense or a punishment". From this word is derived the Latin word poena meaning "pain, punishment, penalty", which in turn gave rise to English words such as subpoena and pain.

== Bibliography ==
- Lochin, Catherine (1994). "Poine". Lexicon Iconographicum Mythologiae Classicae (LIMC). Vol. VII.1: Oidipous – Theseus. Zürich and Munich: Artemis Verlag. ISBN 3-7608-8751-1. Internet Archive.
