= Sleep paralysis in folklore =

Supernatural night creature

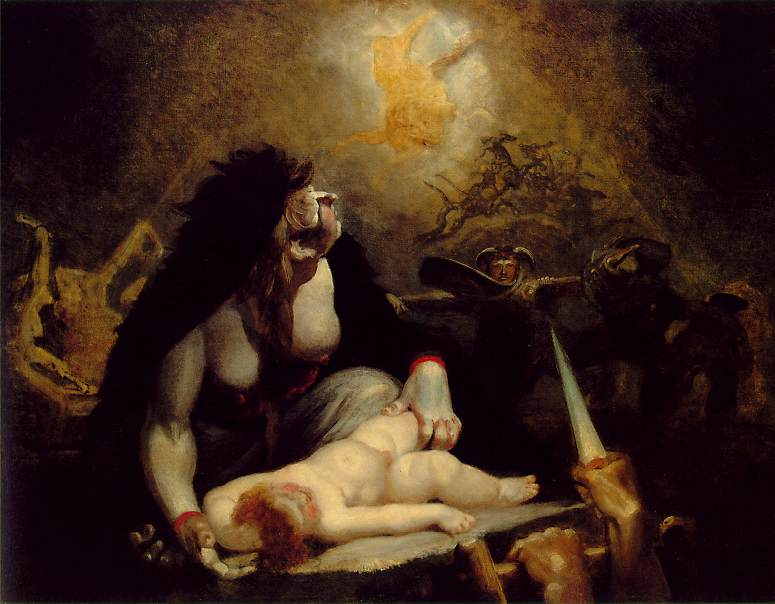
The Night-Hag Visiting Lapland Witches, 1796 painting by Henry Fuseli

Sleep paralysis is a phenomenon in which the sleeper is conscious yet unable to move, leading to a fearful emotional state and sensory hallucinations. These hallucinations can manifest as feeling the presence of a supernatural, malevolent being which often immobilizes the person as if sitting on their chest or the foot of their bed. In folklore, the word "night-mare" or "nightmare" was used to describe this phenomenon before the word received its modern, more general meaning. Different cultures have various names for this phenomenon and the associated supernatural character such as the night hag.

== Sleep paralysis ==
The original definition of sleep paralysis was codified by Samuel Johnson in his A Dictionary of the English Language as nightmare, a term that evolved into our modern definition. Such sleep paralysis was widely considered the work of demons, and more specifically incubi, which were thought to sit on the chests of sleepers. In Old English the name for these beings was mare or mære (from a proto-Germanic *marōn, cf. Old Norse mara), hence comes the mare part in nightmare. The word might be etymologically cognate to Greek Marōn (in the Odyssey) and Sanskrit Māra.

== Folklore ==
- In Scandinavian folklore, sleep paralysis is caused by a mare, a supernatural creature related to incubi and succubi. The mare is a damned woman, who is cursed and her body is carried mysteriously during sleep and without her noticing. In this state, she visits villagers to sit on their rib cages while they are asleep, causing them to experience nightmares. The Swedish film Marianne examines the folklore surrounding sleep paralysis.
- Folk belief in Newfoundland in Canada and South Carolina and Georgia in the United States describe the negative figure of the hag who leaves her physical body at night, and sits on the chest of her victim. The victim usually wakes with a feeling of terror, has difficulty breathing because of a perceived heavy invisible weight on his or her chest, and is unable to move i.e., experiences sleep paralysis. This nightmare experience is described as being "hag-ridden" in the Gullah lore. The "Old Hag" was a nightmare spirit in British and also Anglophone North American folklore.
- In Fiji, the experience is interpreted as kana tevoro, being "eaten" by a demon. In many cases the demon can be the spirit of a recently dead relative who has come back for some unfinished business, or has come to communicate some important news to the living. Often persons sleeping near the afflicted person say kania, kania, "eat! eat!" in an attempt to prolong the possession for a chance to converse with the dead relative or spirit and seek answers as to why he or she has come back. The person waking up from the experience is often asked to immediately curse or chase the spirit of the dead relative, which sometimes involves literally speaking to the spirit and telling him or her to go away or using expletives.
- In Albanian folk beliefs, Mokthi is believed to be a male spirit with a golden fez hat who appears to women who are usually tired or suffering and stops them from moving. It is believed that if they can take his golden hat, he will grant them a wish, but then he will visit them frequently although he is harmless. There are talismans that can provide protection from Mokthi and one way is to put one's husband's hat near the pillow while sleeping. Mokthi or Makthi in Albanian means "Nightmare".
- In Nigeria, "ISP appears to be far more common and recurrent among people of African descent than among whites or Nigerian Africans," and is often referred to within African communities as "the Devil on your back." and is called "Dannau" by the Hausa people
- In Turkey, sleep paralysis is called Karabasan, and is similar to other stories of demonic visitation during sleep. A supernatural being, commonly known as a jinn (cin in Turkish), comes to the victim's room, holds him or her down hard enough not to allow any kind of movement, and starts to strangle the person. To get rid of the demonic creature, one needs to pray to Allah by reading Al-Falaq and Al-Nas from the Qur'an. Moreover, in some derivatives of the stories, the jinn has a wide hat and if the person can show the courage and take its hat, the djinn becomes his slave.
- In Thailand, it is believed that sleep paralysis and discomfort is caused by a ghost of the Thai folklore known as Phi Am (Thai: ผีอำ). Some people claim that this spirit may even cause bruises. Stories about this spirit are common in Thai comics.
- In the Southern United States, it is sometimes referred to as "witch riding".
- In Eastern Chinese folklore, it is thought that a mouse can steal human breath at night. Human breath strengthens the mouse, allowing it longevity and the ability to briefly become human at night, in a similar fashion to fox spirits. The mouse sits near the person's face or under their nostrils.

=== East Asia ===
- In Chinese culture, sleep paralysis is widely known as "鬼壓身/鬼压身" (pinyin: guǐ yā shēn) or "鬼壓床/鬼压床" (pinyin: guǐ yā chuáng), which literally translates into "ghost pressing on body" or "ghost pressing on bed." A more modern term is "夢魘/梦魇" (pinyin: mèng yǎn).
- In Japanese culture, sleep paralysis is referred to as kanashibari (金縛り), literally "bound or fastened in metal", from "kane" (metal) and "shibaru" (to bind, to tie, to fasten). This term is occasionally used by English speaking authors to refer to the phenomenon both in academic papers and in pop psych literature.
- In Korean culture, sleep paralysis is called gawi nulim (Korean: 가위눌림), literally, "being pressed down by something scary in a dream." It is often associated with a belief that a ghost or spirit is lying on top of or pressing down on the sufferer.
- In Mongolian culture, nightmares in general as well as sleep paralysis is referred to by the verb-phrase khar darakh (written kara darahu), meaning "to be pressed by the Black" or "when the Dark presses." Kara means black, and may refer to the dark side personified. Kharin buu means "shaman of the black" (shamans of the dark side only survive in far-northern Mongolia), while tsaghaan zugiin buu means "shaman of the white direction" (referring to shamans who only invoke benevolent spirits). Compare 'karabasan' (the dark presser) in Turkish, which may date from pre-Islamic times when the Turks had the same religion and mythology as the Mongols. See Mythology of the Turkic and Mongolian peoples and Tengriism.
- In Tibetan culture, sleep paralysis is often known as dip-non (གྲིབ་གནོན་ - Kham) or dip-phok (གྲིབ་ཕོག་ - Ladakh), which translates roughly as "oppressed/struck by dip"; dip, literally meaning shadow, refers to a kind of spiritual pollution.

=== South-East Asia ===
- In Cambodian, Lao, and Thai culture sleep paralysis is called phǐǐ am (Thai pronunciation: [pʰǐi.ʔam], Lao pronunciation: [pʰǐi.ʔàm]) and khmout sukkhot. It is described as an event in which the person is sleeping and dreams that one or more ghostly figures are nearby or even holding him or her down. The sufferer is unable to move or make any noises. This is not to be confused with pee khao and khmout jool, ghost possession.
- In Hmong culture, sleep paralysis is understood to be caused by a nocturnal pressing spirit, dab tsog. Dab tsog attacks "sleepers" by sitting on their chests, sometimes attempting to strangle them. Some believe that dab tsog is responsible for sudden arrhythmic death syndrome (SANDS).
- In Vietnamese culture, sleep paralysis is called ma đè, meaning "held down by a ghost," or bóng đè, meaning "held down by a shadow."
- In Philippine culture, bangungot has traditionally been attributed to nightmares. Batibat or bangungot has been believed to takes on a form of grotesque, obese woman who sat on her victim's chest. People who claim to survive such nightmares report symptoms of sleep paralysis.
- In Malay of Malay Peninsula, sleep paralysis is known as kena tindih (or ketindihan in Indonesia), which means "being pressed." Incidents are commonly considered the work of a malign agency; occurring in what are explained as blind spots in the field of vision, they are reported as demonic figures.

=== South Asia ===
- In Kashmiri mythology, this is caused by an invisible creature called a "Roch", Some people believe that a "Roch" lives in every house and attacks somebody if the house has not been cleaned. One also experiences this if one has been doing something evil, satanic or derives pleasure from the misfortunes of others. This creature is also known as "pasikdhar" or a "sayaa" or as "GharDivta" by Kashmiri Pandits (Kashmiri aboriginals with Hindu faith)
- In Pakistan, sleep paralysis is considered an encounter with Shaitan (Urdu: شيطان ) (Satan), evil jinns or demons who have taken over one's body. This ghoul is known as bakhtak (Urdu: بختک) or 'ifrit'. It is also assumed that it is caused by the black magic performed by enemies and jealous people. People, especially children and young girls, wear Ta'wiz (Urdu: تعویز) (Amulet) to ward off evil eye. Spells, incantations and curses could also result in ghouls haunting a person. Some homes and places are also believed to be haunted by evil ghosts, satanic or other supernatural beings and they could haunt people living there especially during the night. Muslim holy persons (Imams, Maulvis, Sufis, Mullahs, Faqirs) perform exorcism on individuals who are believed to be possessed. The homes, houses, buildings and grounds are blessed and consecrated by Mullahs or Imams by reciting Qur'an and Adhan (Urdu: أَذَان), the Islamic call to prayer, recited by the muezzin.
- In Chitrali mythology, the phenomenon is referred to the Khapisi. The Khapisi sits on the chest of a sleeping person and renders one unable to breathe and move.
- In Bengali, the phenomenon of sleep paralysis is referred to as boba ("speechless").
- In Tamil culture, this particular phenomenon is referred to as Amuku Be or Amuku Pei meaning "the ghost that forces one down."
- In Nepal, especially in Newari culture, it is also known as Khyaak, after a ghost-like figure believed to reside in the darkness under the staircases of a house.
- In Karnataka, India, it is called 'Othada Thuliyodhu'.

=== West and Central Asia ===
- In Arab Culture, sleep paralysis is often referred to as Ja-thoom (Arabic: جاثوم), literally "What sits heavily on something". In folklore across Arab countries, the Ja-thoom is believed to be a shayṭān or an 'ifrīt sitting on top of the person or is also choking them. It is said that it can be prevented by sleeping on your right side and reading the Throne Verse of the Quran.
- In Turkish culture, sleep paralysis is often referred to as karabasan ("the dark presser/assailer"). It is believed to be a creature that attacks people in their sleep, pressing on their chest and stealing their breath. However, folk legends do not provide a reason why the devil or ifrit does that.
- In Persian culture it is known as bakhtak (Persian: بختک), which is a ghost-like creature that sits on the dreamer's chest, making breathing hard for them. Bakhtak means small fortune, and it is believed if the dreamer reaches out and holds his nose, he would tell him/her where the treasure is.
- In Kurdish culture, sleep paralysis is often referred to as motakka. It is believed to be a demon that attacks people in their sleep, and particularly children of young age, and steals their breath away as they breathe heavily and keeps it out of reach.
- In Pashtun culture, it is known as "Khapasa". It is believed that it is a ghost without thumb fingers. The ghost tries to suffocate you by pressing your throat and sitting on your chest. However, since the ghost has no thumbs finger that is why it cannot suffocate effectively by using just the index and middle fingers of both hands.

=== Africa ===
- Ogun Oru is a traditional explanation for nocturnal disturbances among the Yoruba of Southwest Nigeria; ogun oru ("nocturnal warfare") involves an acute night-time disturbance that is culturally attributed to demonic infiltration of the body and psyche during dreaming. Ogun oru is characterized by its occurrence, a female preponderance, the perception of an underlying feud between the sufferer's earthly spouse and a "spiritual" spouse, and the event of bewitchment through eating while dreaming. The condition is believed to be treatable through Christian prayers or elaborate traditional rituals designed to exorcise the imbibed demonic elements.
- In Egypt, it is called Kaboos (كابوس) "Compressor" and it is similar to Jathoom in other neighbouring cultures. It is widely attributed to djinn who might be doing it out of malevolence, mischief, or simply by accident.
- In Zimbabwean Shona culture the word madzikirira is used to refer something strongly pressing one down. This mostly refers to the spiritual world in which some spirit—especially an evil one—tries to use its victim for some evil purpose. The people believe that witches can only be people of close relations to be effective, and hence a witches often try to use one's spirit to bewitch one's relatives.
- In Ethiopian culture the word dukak (ዱካክ, "depression") is used, which is believed to be an evil spirit that possesses people during their sleep. Some people believe this experience is a symptom of withdrawal from the stimulant khat. The evil spirit dukak is an anthropomorphic personification of the depression that often results from the act of quitting chewing khat. 'Dukak' often appears in hallucinations of the quitters and metes out punishments to its victims for offending him by quitting. The punishments are often in the form of implausible physical punishments (e.g., the dukak puts the victim in a bottle and shakes the bottle vigorously) or outrageous tasks the victim must perform (e.g., swallow a bag of gravel).
- In Swahili speaking areas of Southeast Africa, it is known as jinamizi ("strangled by jinn"), which refers to a creature sitting on one's chest making it difficult for him/her to breathe. It is attributed to result from a person sleeping on his back. Most people also recall being strangled by this 'creature'.
- In the Moroccan culture, sleep paralysis is known as bou rattat, which means a demon that presses and covers the sleeper's body so they cannot move or speak.

=== Europe ===
- In Finnish folk culture sleep paralysis is called unihalvaus (dream paralysis), but the Finnish word for nightmare, painajainen, is believed to originally have meant sleep paralysis, as it is formed from the word painaja, which translates to pusher or presser, and the diminutive suffix -nen.
- In Hungarian folk culture sleep paralysis is called lidércnyomás (lidérc pressing) and can be attributed to a number of supernatural entities like lidérc (wraith), boszorkány (witch), tündér (fairy) or ördögszerető (demon lover). The word boszorkány itself stems from the Turkish root bas-, meaning "to press."
- In Iceland folk culture sleep paralysis is generally called having a Mara. A goblin or a succubus (since it is generally female) believed to cause nightmares (the origin of the word 'Nightmare' itself is derived from an English cognate of her name). Other European cultures share variants of the same folklore, calling her under different names; Proto-Germanic: marōn; Old English: mære; German: Mahr; Dutch: nachtmerrie; Icelandic, Old Norse, Faroese, and Swedish: mara; Danish: mare; Norwegian: mare; Old Irish: morrigain; Croatian, Bosnian, Serbian, Slovene: môra; Bulgarian, Polish: mara; French: cauchemar; Romanian: moroi; Czech: můra; Slovak: mora. The origin of the belief itself is much older, back to the reconstructed Proto Indo-European root mora-, an incubus, from the root mer- "to rub away" or "to harm."
- In Malta, folk culture attributes a sleep paralysis incident to an attack by the Haddiela, who is married to Hares, an entity in Maltese folk culture that haunts the individual in ways similar to a poltergeist. As believed in folk culture, to get rid of the Haddiela, one must place a piece of silverware or a knife under the pillow prior to sleep.
- In Greece and Cyprus, it is believed that sleep paralysis occurs when a ghost-like creature or Demon named Mora, Vrahnas or Varypnas (Greek: Μόρα, Βραχνάς, Βαρυπνάς) tries to steal the victim's speech or sits on the victim's chest causing asphyxiation.
- In Catalonia legend and popular culture, the Pesanta is an enormous dog (or sometimes a cat) that goes into people's houses in the night and puts itself on their chests making it difficult for them to breathe and causing them the most horrible nightmares. The Pesanta is black and hairy, with steel paws, but with holes so it cannot take anything.
- In Sardinia, one of Italy's islands, there is an old belief that identifies the cause of sleep paralysis in a demoniac being called "Ammuttadori". This ghoulish creature sits in the chest of the sleeping victim, suffocating him and, sometimes, ripping the skin with his nails. It is also believed, in some parts of the island, that this demon wears seven red caps on his head: if the victim resists the pain and succeeds to steal one of the caps, he will soon find a hidden treasure as a reward.
- In Scottish Gaelic culture sleep paralysis is called trom-laidhe (heavy lying) and this term has become the general term for 'nightmare' in the modern language.
- In Latvian folk culture sleep paralysis is called a torture or strangling by Lietuvēns. It is thought to be a soul of a killed (strangled, drowned, hanged) person and attacks both people and domestic animals. When under attack, one must move the toe of the left foot to get rid of the attacker.

=== Americas ===
- In Haiti, the Tonton Macoute or Uncle Gunnysack is a Haitian bogeyman who kidnaps naughty and misbehaving children who is out late at night, puts children into his gunnysack and disappeared overnight.
- During the Salem witch trials several people reported night-attacks by various alleged witches, including Bridget Bishop, that may have been caused by sleep paralysis.
- In Mexico, it is believed that this is caused by the spirit of a dead person. This ghost lies down upon the body of the sleeper, rendering them unable to move. People refer to this as "subirse el muerto" (dead person on you).
- In many parts of the Southern United States, the phenomenon is known as a hag, and the event is said to portend an approaching tragedy or accident.
- In Newfoundland, it is known as the 'Old Hag'. In island folklore, the Hag can be summoned to attack a third party, like a curse. In his 1982 book, The Terror that Comes in the Night, David J. Hufford writes that in local culture the way to call the Hag is to recite the Lord's Prayer backwards.
- In contemporary western culture the phenomenon of supernatural assault are thought to be the work of what are known as shadow people. Victims report primarily three different entities, a man with a hat, the old hag noted above, and a hooded figure. Sleep paralysis is known to involve a component of hallucination in 20% of the cases, which may explain these sightings. Sleep paralysis in combination with hallucinations has long been suggested as a possible explanation for reported alien abduction.
- Several studies show that African-Americans may be predisposed to isolated sleep paralysis—known in folklore as "the witch is riding your back" "the witch is riding you" or "the haint is riding you." Other studies show that African-Americans who experience frequent episodes of isolated sleep paralysis, i.e., reporting having one or more sleep paralysis episodes per month coined as "sleep paralysis disorder," were predisposed to panic attacks. This finding has been replicated by other independent researchers.
- In Brazil, there is a legend about a mythological being called the pisadeira ("she who steps"). She is described as a tall, skinny old woman, with long dirty nails in dried toes, white tangled hair, a long nose, staring red eyes, and greenish teeth on her evil laugh. She lives over the roofs, waiting to step on the chest of those who sleep with a full stomach.

== See also ==
- Night terror
- Basty
