= Al Basty =

Ancient female spirit

Al Basty (Turkish: Albastı; Uzbek: Alvasti; Tatar, Kyrgyz, Kazakh: Албасты, Chuvash: Алпастă, Azerbaijani: Albasdı, Russian: Албасты́) or Al Kardai is an ancient female spirit, the personification of guilt, found in folklore throughout the Caucasus mountains, with origins going as far back as Sumerian mythology. Al means red, and bastı means pressure or pressing in Turkic languages.

== Other languages ==
- Bashkort: Албаҫты
- Uzbek: Alvasti
- Altai: Алвасти́
- Turkmen: Албассы
- Kyrgyz: Албарсты́
- Nogai: Албаслы́
- Kumyk: Албаслы́
- Balkar: Алмасты́
- Tajik: Албасти
- Lezgian: Алпаб
- Chechen: Алмазы
- Yaghnobian: Албасты
- Chuvash: Алпастӑ
- Sogdian: Олбасты
- Russian: Албасты́

== Caucasian and Middle Eastern folklore ==
=== Sumerian folklore ===
A variation of the Al Basti myth stretches back into Sumerian times as one of the names given to Lilith. In later Rabbinical interpretations of the Talmud, she was regarded as the first wife of Adam, cast out of Paradise for her willfulness and independence. In this form much of the mythology surrounding Lilith has also been ascribed, in different accounts, to Al Basti, though with local regional variances taken into account.

=== Turkic folklore ===
In Turkic folklore Al Basti has been often confused as both a Mare, a Succubus, as well as any number of Middle Eastern female spirits which are told to enter a man's erotic dreams. However, the difference in the Al Basti legends is that she is not a sexual spirit, she rather visits those “who have guilty souls” and “come from families that have committed bloody crimes that have gone unpunished.”

This spirit is mostly known as Al Karısı in Turkic folklore. It is believed that she mostly haunts women in their postpartum period which causes emergence of phycological problems. Therefore, traditional practices applied for 40 days for these women as a part of postpartum care.

According to scholar Özhan Öztürk those who Al Basti visits are said to wake up in “an intense fever ... She is also known to steal horses, who are found sweating and exhausted in the morning, and unable to provide a full day's work. Due to her torments, she is also known as the 'red mother'.”

=== Armenian folklore ===
There is another version of Al Basti found in Armenian folklore, referred to simply as Āl, a “demon of childbirth who blinds unborn children and causes miscarriages and stillbirths to women who have committed crimes that have gone unpunished. In this form she appears as spirit of flame, with snake-like hair, brass fingernails and iron teeth ... [she] hides in damp places.” According to Ann and Imel there is a similar legend found in Afghanistan.

== See also ==
- Al (folklore) – Demon of childbirth in certain Asian folk traditions
- Almas (folklore) – Alleged creature in the Caucasus, Pamir and Altai mountains
- Basty – Evil spirit in Turkic folklore
