= Hufford =

Hufford is a surname. Notable people with the surname include:

- Chris Hufford, English audio engineer, record producer, and band manager
- David Hufford (fl. 1963–2010), American ethnographer
- Del Hufford (1901–1984), American football player
- Paul Hufford, American football player
- Susan Hufford (1938–2006), American actress and psychotherapist
