= Incubus =

Mythological demon that seduces women

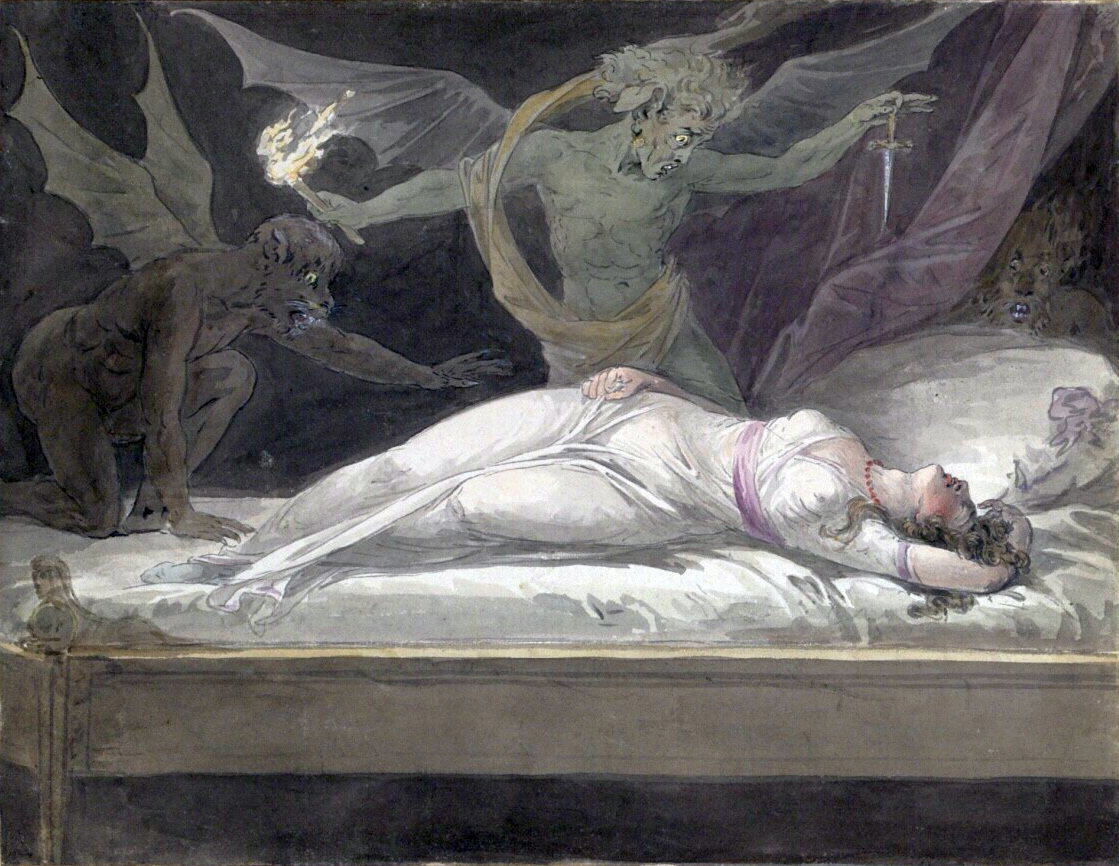
Depiction of incubi, Vincenz Georg Kininger, 1879

An incubus (pl. incubi) is a male demon who is described in various folklore as appearing in the dreams of female humans in order to seduce them. Repeated interactions between an incubus and a woman will lead to sexual activity, a bond forming between them, and ultimately sexual intercourse, as he requires vaginal ejaculation discharge to survive. The establishment and perpetuation of such a relationship enables the production of a hybrid child known as a cambion, but at the expense of the woman, whose mental and physical health will deteriorate rapidly, eventually resulting in her death if the incubus continues courting her for a protracted period.

In modern representations, an incubus is often depicted as a handsome man seducer or charming, rather than as demonic or frightening, to attract people instead of repulsing them. The female counterpart of the incubus is the succubus. Historically, folkloric belief in incubi was motivated by distressing nighttime phenomena, chiefly wet dreams and sleep paralysis.

In medieval Europe, union of an incubus or succubus and a human was supposed by some to result in the birth of beings half-demon and half-human. Legendary magician Merlin was said to have been fathered by an incubus. Walter Stephens writes in his book Demon Lovers that some traditions hold that repeated sexual activity with an incubus or succubus may result in the deterioration of health, an impaired mental state, or even death.

== Etymological, ancient, and religious descriptions ==
The Late Latin word incubus ("a nightmare induced by a demon") is derived from Latin incubō ("nightmare, what lies down on one whilst one sleeps") and further from incubāre ("to lie upon, to hatch"). One of the earliest evident mentions of a demon sharing qualities with an incubus comes from Mesopotamia on the Sumerian King List, circa 2400 BC, where the hero Gilgamesh's father is listed as Lilu. Lilu is described as "disturbing" and "seducing" women in their sleep, while Lilitu, a female demon, is described as appearing to men in erotic dreams. Two other corresponding demons also appear in Mesopotamian accounts: Ardat lili, who visits men by night, and Idlu lili, a male counterpart to Ardat lili who visits women by night and begets from them. Ardat lili is derived from ardatu, the word for "a woman of marriageable age", while idlu lili is derived from idlu, meaning a "grown man". These demons were originally storm demons. They eventually became regarded as night demons, potentially due to mistaken etymology.

The half-human offspring of such a union is sometimes referred to as a cambion. An incubus may pursue sexual relations with a woman to father a child, as in the legend of Merlin, which was the first popular account of demonic parentage in Western Christian literature.

In the Malleus Maleficarum, exorcism is presented as one of the five ways to overcome the attacks of incubi. The others are Confession, the Sign of the Cross or recital of the Hail Mary, moving the afflicted to another location, and by excommunication of the attacking entity, "which is perhaps the same as exorcism". In contrast, the Franciscan friar Ludovico Maria Sinistrari stated that incubi "do not obey exorcists, have no dread of exorcisms, show no reverence for holy things, at the approach of which they are not in the least overawed".

One scientific explanation for the incubus concept could fall under the scope of sleep paralysis, as well as hypnagogia, as it is common to experience auditory and visual hallucinations in both states. Typical examples include a feeling of being crushed or suffocated, electric "tingles" or "vibrations", imagined speech and other noises, the imagined presence of a visible or invisible entity, and sometimes intense emotions of fear or euphoria and orgasmic feelings. These often appear quite real and vivid, especially auditory hallucinations of music, which can be quite loud, indistinguishable from music being played in the same room. Humanoid and animal figures, often shadowy or blurry, are often present in hypnagogic hallucinations, more so than other hallucinogenic states.

The combination of sleep paralysis and hypnagogic hallucination could cause someone to believe that a "demon was holding them down". Nocturnal arousal etc. could be explained by creatures causing otherwise guilt-producing behavior. Add to this the common phenomena of nocturnal arousal and nocturnal emission, and all the elements required to believe in an incubus are present.

Additionally, some crimes of sexual assault were likely passed off as the actions of incubi. Some authors speculate that rapists may have attributed the rapes of sleeping women and men to demons to escape punishment. Robert Masello asserts that a friend or relative is at the top of the list in such cases, and that the assault would be kept secret by the intervention of "spirits".

== Regional variations ==
A number of folklore/mythos relating to or similar to the incubus is seen around the world. The alp of Teutonic or German folklore is one of the better known. In Zanzibar, Popo Bawa primarily attacks men and generally behind closed doors. "The Trauco", according to the traditional mythology of the Chiloé Province of Chile, is a hideous deformed dwarf who lulls nubile young women and seduces them. The Trauco is said to be responsible for unwanted pregnancies, especially in unmarried women. Perhaps another variation of this conception is the "Tintín" in Ecuador, a dwarf who is fond of abundant-haired women and seduces them at night by playing the guitar outside their windows — a myth that researchers believe was created during the colonial period to explain pregnancies in women who never left their houses without a chaperone. In Hungary, a lidérc can be a Satanic lover that flies at night and appears as a fiery light (an ignis fatuus or will o' the wisp) or, in its more benign form as a featherless chicken.

In Brazil and the rainforests of the Amazon basin, the Amazon river dolphin (or boto) is believed to be a combination of siren and incubus that shape-shifts into a very charming and handsome man who seduces young women and takes them into the river. It is said to be responsible for disappearances and unwanted pregnancies. According to legend, a boto always wears a hat to disguise the breathing hole at the top of its head while in human form, metamorphosising back into a dolphin during the day.

The Southern African incubus demon is the Tokolosh. Chaste women place their beds upon bricks to deter the rather short fellows from attaining their sleeping forms. They also share the hole in the head detail and water-dwelling habits of the boto.

In Swedish folklore, the mara or mare is a spirit or goblin that rides on the chests of humans while they sleep, giving them bad dreams (or "nightmares"). Belief in the mare goes back to the Norse Ynglinga saga from the 13th century, but the belief is probably even older. The mare was likely inspired by sleep paralysis.

In Assam, a northeastern state of India, it is mostly known as pori (Assamese: পৰী, meaning "angel") (pari in Hindi and etymological cousin of fairy). According to the mythology, Pori comes to a man at night in his dreams and seduces him. Gradually, the victim's health deteriorates, and in some cases, he develops suicidal tendencies.

In Turkish culture, the incubus is known as Karabasan. It is an evil being that descends upon some sleepers at night. These beings are thought to be spirits or jinns. It can be seen or heard in the nightmare and a heavy weight is felt on the chest. Yet, people cannot wake up from that state. Some of the causes are sleeping without adequately covering the body (especially women) and eating in bed.

In Ukrainian folklore, the "perelesnyk" is a significant figure resembling an incubus and associated with meteors, lightning, and fire. This supernatural being was believed to transform into a fiery dragon or young man, entering homes through chimneys, doors, or windows to seduce women by taking on the appearance of deceased spouses or lovers. Considered both seductive and perilous, the perelesnyk gifted treasures at night that turned to worthless items by daybreak. Its touch could drain vitality and hasten death. Countermeasures included uttering "amen" or wearing a crucifix. The character's appearance in Ukrainian literature, such as Lesya Ukrainka's "The Forest Song", illustrates the cultural impact of this entity, showcasing its role in shaping perceptions of the supernatural and influencing creative works.

In the Xhosa, Pondo and Zulu cultures of South Africa, some variations of the impundulu resemble incubi as they are believed to appear as handsome men to seduce women and drink their blood.

Although said creatures exhibit similar characteristics to an Incubus, they may not be considered an Incubus in the traditional sense.

== See also ==
- Batibat
- Christian demonology
- Classification of demons
- Demonology
- Firedrake (folklore)
- Gancanagh
- Krampus
- Kurupi
- List of fictional demons
- List of theological demons
- Night terror
- Sexuality in Christian demonology
- Alp
- Succubus
