= Nightmare =

Unpleasant dream

- Specialty: Sleep medicine, psychology, psychiatry
- Causes: Stress, anxiety, fever

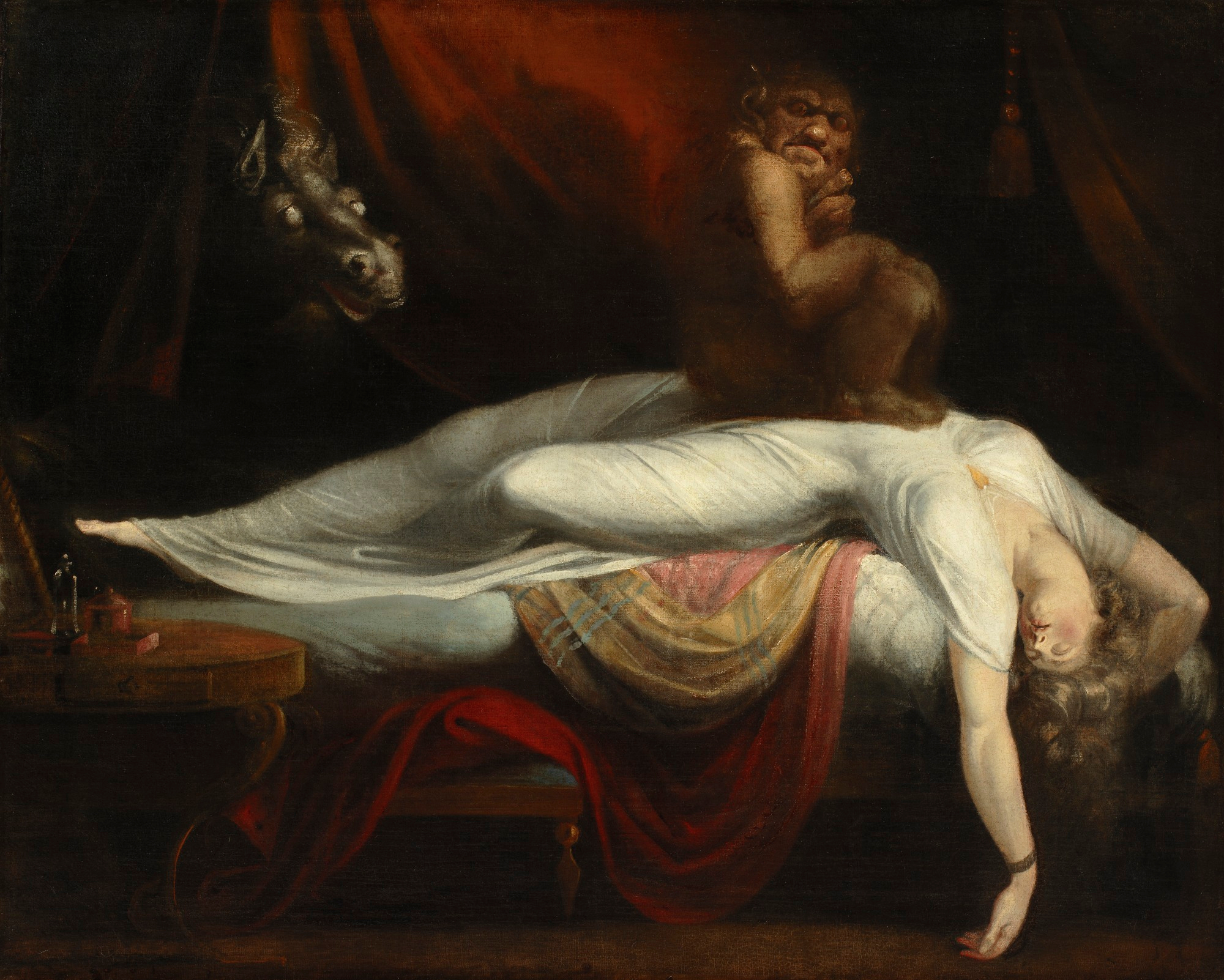
The Nightmare (Henry Fuseli, 1781), Detroit Institute of Arts

A nightmare, also known as a bad dream, is an unpleasant dream that can cause a strong emotional response from the mind, typically fear but also despair, anxiety, disgust or sadness. The dream may contain situations of discomfort, psychological or physical terror, or panic. After a nightmare, a person will often awaken in a state of distress and may be unable to return to sleep for a short period of time. Recurrent nightmares may require medical help, as they can interfere with sleeping patterns and cause insomnia.

Nightmares can have physical causes such as sleeping in an uncomfortable position or having a fever, or psychological causes such as stress or anxiety. Eating before going to sleep, which triggers an increase in the body's metabolism and brain activity, can be a potential stimulus for nightmares.

The prevalence of nightmares in children (5–12 years old) is between 20 and 30%; the prevalence in adults is between 8 and 30%. In common language, the meaning of nightmare has extended as a metaphor to many bad things, such as a bad situation or a scary monster or person.

== Etymology ==
The word nightmare is derived from the European folklorical "mare" (cf. Old English: mare, mære, Old Norse: mara), a mythological female demon or thereof, which sits on the chest of sleeping people and brings on frightening dreams. The term has no known etymological connection with the Modern English word for a female horse (cf. cognate Swedish: märr). The word nightmare has cognates in various European languages: Dutch: nachtmerrie, German: Nachtmahr (dated), Swedish: mardröm (lit. 'mare-dream'). Male equivelants also exist in European folklore, like the alp.

Originally, "mare" or "nightmare" referred more specifically to sleep paralysis, in which an experience of terror and paralysis during sleep can be associated with a sense of pressure on the chest and the dreamed presence of entities often pictured as demons, sometimes sitting on the chest. The words also referred to such a "demon," which was also referred to as a hag and the experience as being "hag-ridden." The meaning of "nightmare" had generalized from sleep paralysis to any bad dream by 1829. In other languages, the word for "bad dream" similarly evolved in sense from words for "sleep paralysis," often with senses related to the pressure on the chest. For example, French cauchemar (the first element from old French chauchier "to press, trample," the second related to "mare"); Spanish pesadilla, from pesada "weight"; or Hungarian lidércnyomás, from nyomás "pressure."

== History and folklore ==
The sorcerous demons of Iranian mythology known as Divs are likewise associated with the ability to afflict their victims with nightmares. The mare of Germanic and Slavic folklore were thought to ride on people's chests while they sleep, causing nightmares.

== Signs and symptoms ==
Those with nightmares experience abnormal sleep architecture. The impact of having a nightmare during the night has been found to be very similar to that of insomnia. This is thought to be caused by frequent nocturnal awakenings and fear of falling asleep. When awoken from REM sleep by a nightmare, the dreamer can usually recall the nightmare in detail. They may also awaken in a heightened state of distress, with an elevated heart rate or increased perspiration. Nightmare disorder symptoms include repeated awakenings from the major sleep period or naps with detailed recall of extended and extremely frightening dreams, usually involving threats to survival, security, or self-esteem. The awakenings generally occur during the second half of the sleep period.

== Classification ==
According to the International Classification of Sleep Disorders-Third Edition (ICSD-3), the nightmare disorder, together with REM sleep behaviour disorder (RBD) and recurrent isolated sleep paralysis, form the REM-related parasomnias subcategory of the Parasomnias cluster. Nightmares may be idiopathic without any signs of psychopathology, or associated with disorders like stress, anxiety, substance abuse, psychiatric illness or PTSD (>80% of PTSD patients report nightmares). As regarding the dream content of the dreams they are usually imprinting negative emotions like sadness, fear or rage. According to the clinical studies the content can include being chased, injury or death of others, falling, natural disasters or accidents. Typical dreams or recurrent dreams may also have some of these topics.

=== Paroniria ===
Paroniria is a medical condition involving an excess of morbid dreams and nightmares. Paroniria is suspected to have many causes, including fear, stress, depression, trauma, and sleep deprivation, among others. It may also be caused by the effects of antihistamines.

== Cause ==
Scientific research shows that nightmares may have many causes. In a study focusing on children, researchers were able to conclude that nightmares directly correlate with the stress in children's lives. Children who experienced the death of a family member or a close friend or know someone with a chronic illness have more frequent nightmares than those who are only faced with stress from school or stress from social aspects of daily life. A study researching the causes of nightmares focuses on patients who have sleep apnea. The study was conducted to determine whether or not nightmares may be caused by sleep apnea, or being unable to breathe. In the nineteenth century, authors believed that nightmares were caused by not having enough oxygen, therefore it was believed that those with sleep apnea had more frequent nightmares than those without it. The results actually showed that healthy people have more nightmares than sleep apnea patients. However, another study supports the hypothesis. In this study, 48 patients (aged 20–85 yrs) with obstructive airways disease (OAD), including 21 with and 27 without asthma, were compared with 149 sex- and age-matched controls without respiratory disease. OAD subjects with asthma reported approximately 3 times as many nightmares as controls or OAD subjects without asthma. The evolutionary purpose of nightmares then could be a mechanism to awaken a person who is in danger.

Lucid-dreaming advocate Stephen LaBerge has outlined a possible reason for how dreams are formulated and why nightmares occur. To LaBerge, a dream starts with an individual thought or scene, such as walking down a dimly lit street. Since dreams are not predetermined, the brain responds to the situation by either thinking a good thought or a bad thought, and the dream framework follows from there. If bad thoughts in a dream are more prominent than good thoughts, the dream may proceed to be a nightmare.

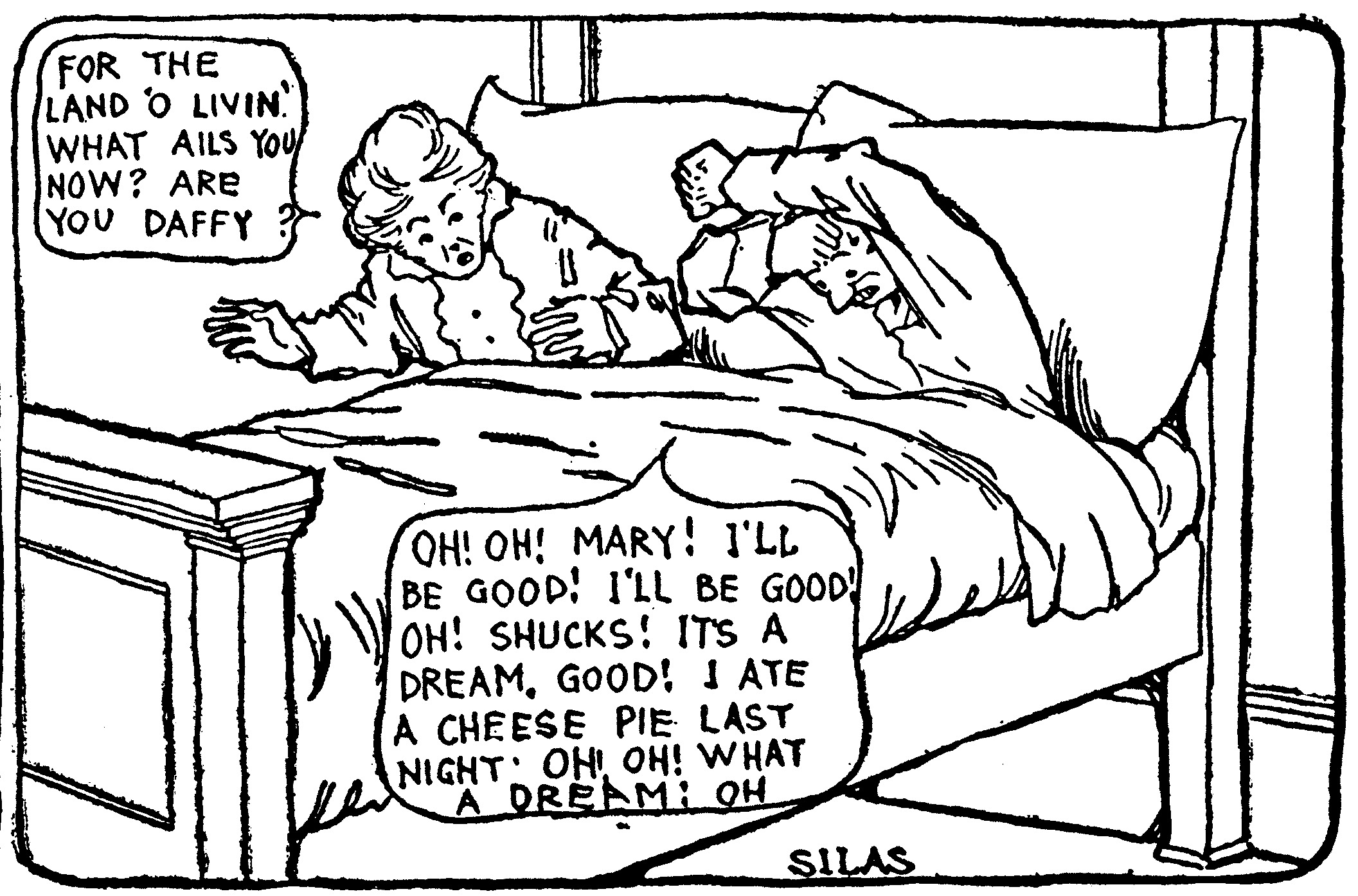
A panel from the early 20th-century comic Dream of the Rarebit Fiend, whose protagonists regularly suffer nightmares after eating cheese.

There is a view, possibly featured in the story A Christmas Carol, that eating cheese before sleep can cause nightmares, but there is little scientific evidence for this. A single, biased study conducted by the British Cheese Board in 2005 argued that consuming cheese could trigger more vivid dreams, but this study was not backed up with sufficient research, and contradicts existing studies which found that consuming dairy products is associated with better overall sleep quality.

Nightmares can also be caused by viewing content in the horror genre, especially right before going to sleep.

While no definitive studies directly link spicy foods to causing nightmares, they may lead to more vivid or remembered dreams due to increased body temperature and metabolism, which can sometimes lead to experiencing nightmares in a similar way that fevers can. This heightened physiological state can disrupt sleep and promote wakefulness, making you more likely to recall any dreams, including disturbing ones, that occur during the night. Eating spicy foods close to bedtime can also lead to digestive discomfort, which can further disturb sleep and contribute to a greater awareness of your dreams.

Severe nightmares are also likely to occur when a person has a fever; these nightmares are often referred to as fever dreams.

Recent research has shown that frequent nightmares may precede the development of neurodegenerative diseases, such as Parkinson's disease and dementia.

== Treatment ==
Sigmund Freud and Carl Jung seemed to have shared a belief that people frequently distressed by nightmares could be re-experiencing some stressful event from the past. Both perspectives on dreams suggest that therapy can provide relief from the dilemma of the nightmarish experience.

Halliday (1987) grouped treatment techniques into four classes. Direct nightmare interventions that combine compatible techniques from one or more of these classes may enhance overall treatment effectiveness:

- Analytic and cathartic techniques
- Storyline alteration procedures
- Face-and-conquer approaches
- Desensitization and related behavioral techniques

=== Post-traumatic stress disorder ===
Recurring post-traumatic stress disorder (PTSD) nightmares in which traumas are re-experienced respond well to a technique called imagery rehearsal. This involves dreamers coming up with alternative, mastery outcomes to the nightmares, mentally rehearsing those outcomes while awake and then reminding themselves at bedtime that they wish these alternative outcomes should the nightmares recur. Research has found that this technique not only reduces the occurrence of nightmares and insomnia but also improves other daytime PTSD symptoms. The most common variations of imagery rehearsal therapy (IRT) "relate to the number of sessions, duration of treatment, and the degree to which exposure therapy is included in the protocol".

=== Medication ===
- Prazosin (alpha-1 blocker) appears useful in decreasing the number of nightmares and the distress caused by them in people with PTSD.
- Risperidone (atypical antipsychotic) at a dosage of 2 mg per day, has been shown in a case report to lead to the remission of nightmares on the first night.
- Trazodone (antidepressant) has been shown in a case report to treat nightmares associated with depressed patients.

Trials have included hydrocortisone, gabapentin, paroxetine, tetrahydrocannabinol, eszopiclone, Sodium oxybate, and carvedilol.

== See also ==
- Bogeyman
- False awakening
- Hag § In folklore
- Horror and terror
- Incubus
- Mare (folklore)
- Night terror
- Nightmare disorder
- Nocnitsa
- Sleep disorder
- Sleep paralysis
- Succubus
- A Nightmare on Elm Street, 1984 film
