= Almas (folklore) =

Alleged creature in the Caucasus, Pamir and Altai mountains

Creature information
- Other name: Almasty
- Similar entities: Yeti, Bigfoot, Skunk ape
- Folklore: Caucasian mythology, Turkic mythology

Origin
- Region: North Caucasus, Northern Asia, Central Asia and portions of Eastern Asia

In North Caucasian and Turkic folklore, an almas, alma or almasty, is a cryptid said to inhabit the Caucasus, Tian Shan and Pamir Mountains of Central Asia, and the Altai Mountains of western Mongolia.

== Etymology ==
The term "almas" and numerous variants thereof appear in Mongolian, Turkic languages, and Iranian languages. (Note: Variants of the name include: Mongolian: Алмас (Almas), Chechen: Алмазы (Almazy), Turkish: Albıs/Albız or Albastı, Kazakh: Алмас (Almas), Russian: Алмасты (Almasty), Armenian: Ալմաս (Almas), Georgian: ალმასი (Almasi), and Kyrgyz: Алмасты (Almastı).)

Scholar Byambyn Rinchen (Note: Rinchen (Rinčen) as "Zhamtsarano's pupil") in a 1964 paper also referred to the creature as "wild man" (Mongolian: kümün görügesü, cf. "kung-guressu" of Przhevalsky below), and commented that "the origin of the old name [Almas] is quite unknown ... and it does not lend itself for translation in other languages". (Note: Rinchen also notes that Ivan T. Sanderson, one of the founders of cryptozoology, made attempts at explaining the name that are "absolutely inacceptable from the point of view of Mongolian philology".)

The name is connected to a variety of place names (toponyms) in southwestern Mongolia, including Almasyn Dobo ('Hills of Almases'), Almasyn Ulan Oula ('Red Mountains of Almases'), and ('Red Rocks of Almases').

Folk belief in the almas in Övörkhangai and Bayankhongor has resulted in a name-avoidance taboo there, wherein the entities may be referred to as akhai, meaning 'uncle-brother'.

The folk traditions of Darkhad include the deity Almas khara Tenguer, meaning 'Almas the Black God' and associated with highland prairies and mountain forests. According to Rinčen, the god may be offered edible wild roots and wild animal meat.

== Description ==
Nikolay Przhevalsky described the almas in 1876, as related to him under the name kung-guressu ("man-beast"), as follows:

"We were told that it had a flat face like that of a human being, and that it often walked on two legs, that its body was covered with a thick black fur, and its feet armed with enormous claws; that its strength was terrible, and that not only were hunters afraid of attacking it, but that the inhabitants removed their habitations from those parts of the country which it visited".

Scholar Damdinzhavyn Maidar has provided the following description in 1981:

Almases, according to the stories of witnesses, appear half animal, half human, with reddish black hair. The face is hairless, the stomach covered with sparse growth. The head seems pointed at the occiput, the forehead flattened back with projecting brow ridges, and prominent cheekbones. They are the height of an average person. The almas walks with half-bent knees, is round-shouldered and pigeon-toed. It has broad shoulders and long arms. The women have long breasts. Almases are timid, suspicious, but not aggressive, and lead a nocturnal way of life. No-one has heard their speech. (Note: Damdinzhavyn Maidar (1981). Pamiatniki istorii i kul'tury Mongolii Памятники истории и культуры Монголии [Historical and cultural monuments of Mongolia] (in Mongolian). Moskva: Mysli. p. 21. translated by Heaney.)

Heaney suggests that the almas should be identified with the Arimaspi, a group of legendary humanoid creatures said to inhabit the Riphean Mountains.

Boris Porshnev, a Soviet scientist from the Soviet Academy of Sciences, in 1963 related:

According to Dr. Rinchen you can still find old people of the Gobi who have seen the footprints of the almas, but all agree that today you see the almas less and less. Almas have a somewhat stooped figure, the legs are slightly bent at the knees, and the hands are longer than in humans. The hair is long, and the body is covered with sparse dark hair. The females have long breasts. Almas do not know the use of fire, guns and weapons. "It is impossible to deny the existence of our distant cousins so far behind us in their development, and that they are living their last days like wild horses and wild camels in the vast Gobi." In the northern part of the MPR the name almas is almost unknown, or is used for an unreal, mythical creature or evil spirit, perhaps something like a witch. In the east, south and far west of the Republic, the name almas is commonly used, sometimes hong-geresu or zagyin emgen, but this is especially for the females.

== In science ==
In 1958, after reported sightings of "snowmen" by scientists, the USSR set up the "snowman commission" to conduct an expedition to the Pamir Mountains to look for evidence of the yeti and almas. The expedition was led by the hydrologist Alexander G. Pronin, and included Porshnev and the surgeon Marie-Jeanne Koffman. Porshnev had learnt about the almas from the Buryat ethnologist Bazar Baradiïne, Koffman was also interested in the almas and had conducted research into them prior to the expedition. In 1964, Porshnev proposed that the almas could be a relict population of Neanderthals still living in Siberia. His report was translated into English and published as a book under the title The Soviet Sasquatch. Porshnev's hypothesis did not find wide acceptance as an explanation for the potential existence of the almas in the Soviet scientific community.

In 1992, a group of scientists went on an expedition to search for the almas in the Caucasus Mountains.

A 2014 study by Bryan Sykes et al. matched the genetic fingerprints of eight hair samples of the "almasty" all from Russia, and matched them to the Eurasian brown bear (Ursus arctos), horse (Equus caballus) and cattle (Bos taurus). Bryan Sykes et al. also produced the controversial result that the golden-brown "yeti" sample from Ladakh (Note: Ladakh lies in eastern Kashmir and administered by India but borders China which disputes the sovereignty.) and the "yeti/migyhur" sample from Bhutan were a 100% match with a museum-held Pleistocene fossil polar bear, but not with any modern specimen. This finding (on the 2 hair samples) was refuted by Eliécer Gutiérrez and Ronald H. Pine in 2015, who concluded there was no reason to regard these as anything but brown bear. In 2014 Ceiridwen J. Edwards and Ross Barnett also refuted the polar bear claim, and concluded the degradation of brown bear DNA to be the likely explanation. (Note: Edwards & Barnett also challenged Sykes et al.'s claim of 100% match to a Pleistocene bear as misstated in the first place, since their analysis showed 100% match to a modern polar bear in database, whereas the Pleistocene sample was off by a sequence at position 1675. Also the Pleistocene sample could be grouped with brown bears showing a C to T base mutation at position 1751.)

According to legend, Zana of Tkhina was an abnauayu, (the Abkhazian equivalent of the almas) of great proportions entirely covered in hair, captured by hunters in the forests of Abkhazia in the mid-19th century. Porshnev on being informed of the story of Zana travelled to Abkhazia, and collected stories from locals who claimed to have first-hand knowledge of her; he then synthesised the collected stories and published them. In 1964, Porshnev attempted to find the graves of Zana and her son Khwit, but was unsuccessful. The residents of the village of Tkhina and cryptozoologists, including Porshnev, considered Zana to be an almas; these theories are nowadays largely considered to be influenced by local folklore. In 2021, the skull Tkhina-75 was exhumed from a grave in a family cemetery, and genomic sequencing conclusively identified Tkhina-75 as Zana. Tkhina-75 was the skull of a middle-aged woman with distinct prognathism. DNA analysis of Zana (and six of her descendants) showed her to be of majority East African descent, with possible West African admixture. The appearance and behavior of Zana described in the legend could be explained by a genetic disorder known as congenital generalized hypertrichosis.

== See also ==
- Al (folklore) – Demon of childbirth in certain Asian folk traditions
- Chuchuna – Mythical ape-like creature from Asia
- Wild man – Mythical figure from medieval European art and literature
- Yeti – Mythical ape-like creature from Asia
