= Pesanta =

Catalan legendary creature

The Pesanta (Catalan pronunciation: [pəˈzantə]) is a creature in Catalan legend and popular culture, usually taking the form of an enormous dog or cat. The Pesanta goes into houses at night and steps on the chests of sleepers, causing breathing difficulties and nightmares. The Pesanta is similar to the Portuguese Pisadeira. It is black and hairy, with steel paws, but its paws have holes in them.

== See also ==
- Sleep paralysis
- Against a Dwarf
- Batibat
- Lietuvēns
- Mare (folklore)
