= Mare (folklore) =

Malicious entity in Germanic and Slavic folklore

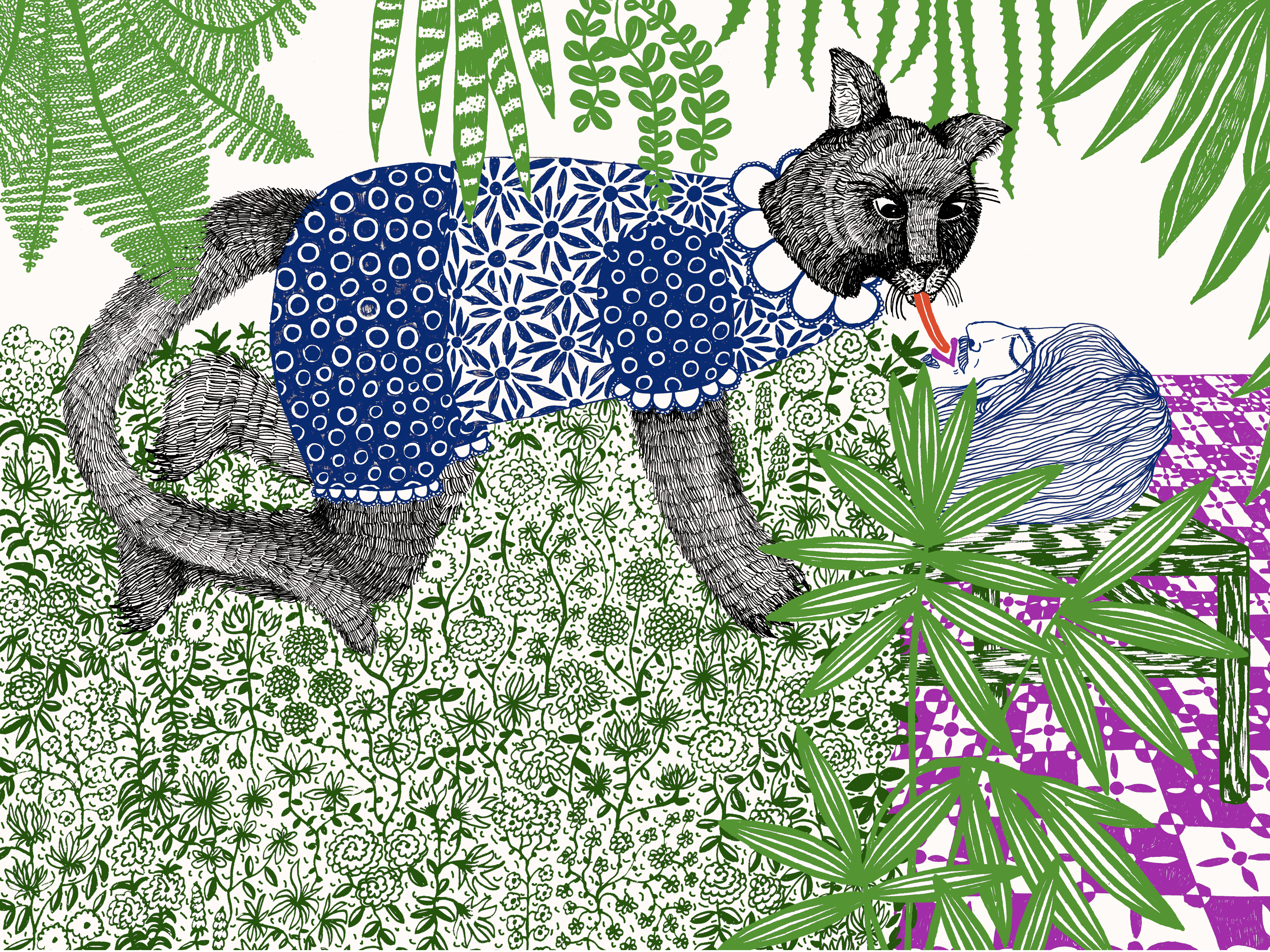
Illustration of mare in cat shape by Kasia Walentynowicz

A mare (Old English: mære; Danish, Norwegian: mare; Swedish: mara; Polish: mara, zmora; among many others) is a malicious entity in Germanic and Slavic folklore that sits, walks, or "rides" on people's chests while they sleep, bringing on nightmares. When placed on the victim's chest, it is said to have a suffocating effect, and can lead to cold sweats or sleep paralysis. It is often a female being with magical abilities for haunting its victim, including the ability to shapeshift.

== Etymology ==
The word mare, through Middle English mare, comes from the Old English feminine noun mære, which had numerous variants: mare, mere, mær, etc. It is etymologically unrelated to its homonym mare, meaning female horse.

Cognates in other languages includes:

- Norse: Old Norse: mara → Danish: mare, Faroese: marra, Icelandic: mara, Norwegian: mare, mara, Swedish: mara
- Dutch: Old Dutch: mare → merrie (Dutch: nachtmerrie)
- Low German: Low German: mahrt, mårt, môr
- High German: Old High German: mahr, mara (Note: Batten gives OHG mahr.) (glossed in Latin as "incuba") → Middle High German: mar, mare (Note: Even though Grimm could not find the Old High German or Middle High German attestations.) → German: Mahr (Nachtmahr), Mare, Mara

These in turn come from Proto-Germanic *marōn. The -mar in French cauchemar ('nightmare') is borrowed from the Germanic through Old French mare.

Most scholars trace the word back to the reconstructed Proto-Indo-European root *mer-, associated with crushing, pressing and oppressing, or according to other sources 'to rub away' or 'to harm'. Compare this to Finnish and Karelian, where the creature is roughly called "pressinger" (Finnish: painajainen, Karelian: painajaini), or "ridinger" (Finnish: ajajainen). Further, in Danish and Norwegian, the word for 'nightmare' is "mare ride" (Danish: mareridt, Norwegian: mareritt); in Icelandic, the word for 'nightmare' is "mare tread", or "mare trample" (Icelandic: martröð); whereas in Swedish and Finnish, the word for 'nightmare' is "mare dream" (Swedish: mardröm, Finnish: painajaisuni).

However, other etymologies have been suggested. For example, Éva Pócs saw the term as being cognate with the Greek term Moros (μόρος, from Proto-Indo-European *móros) meaning "doom". There is no definite answer among historians about the time of origin of the word. According to the philologist Yeleazar Meletinsky, a Slavonic root, Proto-Slavic *mara, passed into the Germanic language no later than the 1st century BC.

== Beliefs ==
The mare was believed to ride horses, which left them exhausted and covered in sweat by the morning. She could also entangle the hair of the sleeping man or beast, (Note: The môr riding horse (pîrd) and casusing mane to be verfilzen ("felted") (lore from island of Rügen).) resulting in "marelocks", called marflätor ('mare-braids') or martovor ('mare-tangles') in Swedish or marefletter and marefloker in Norwegian. The belief probably originated as an explanation to the Polish plait phenomenon, a hair disease.

Even trees were thought to be ridden by the mare, resulting in branches being entangled. (Note: Cf. Tale of the shivering oak below (Pomerania) and repuatation as sap-sucker (Poland),) The undersized, twisted pine-trees growing on coastal rocks and on wet grounds are known in Sweden as martallar ('mare-pines') or in German as Alptraum-Kiefer ('nightmare pine').

According to Paul Devereux, mares included witches who took on the form of animals when their spirits went out and about while they were in trance (see the Icelandic example of Geirrid, below). These included animals such as frogs, cats, horses, hares, dogs, oxen, birds and often bees and wasps.

== German folklore ==
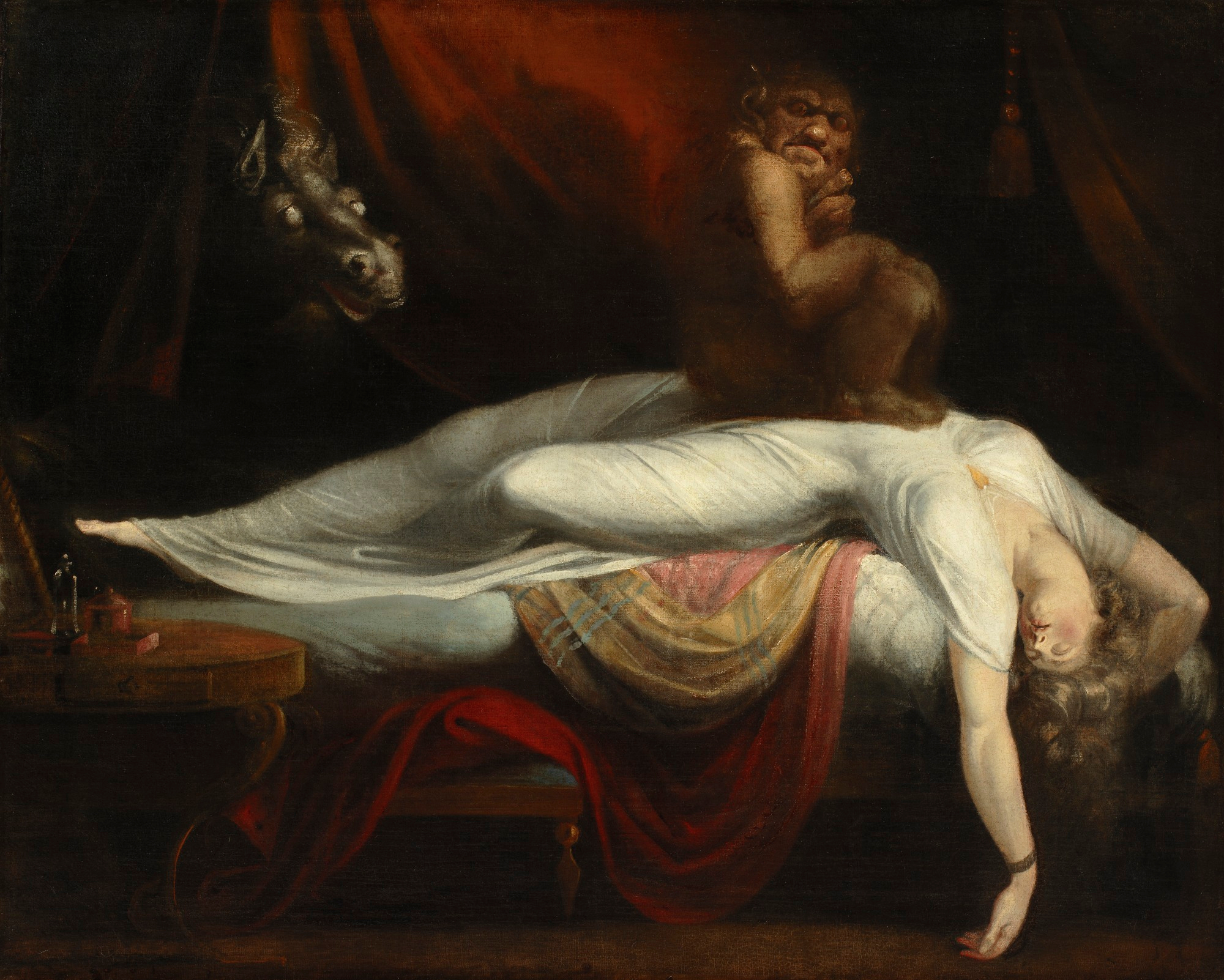
The Nightmare, by Henry Fuseli, 1781, depicts an alp sitting on the sleeper's chest, with a mare (female horse) staring through the background

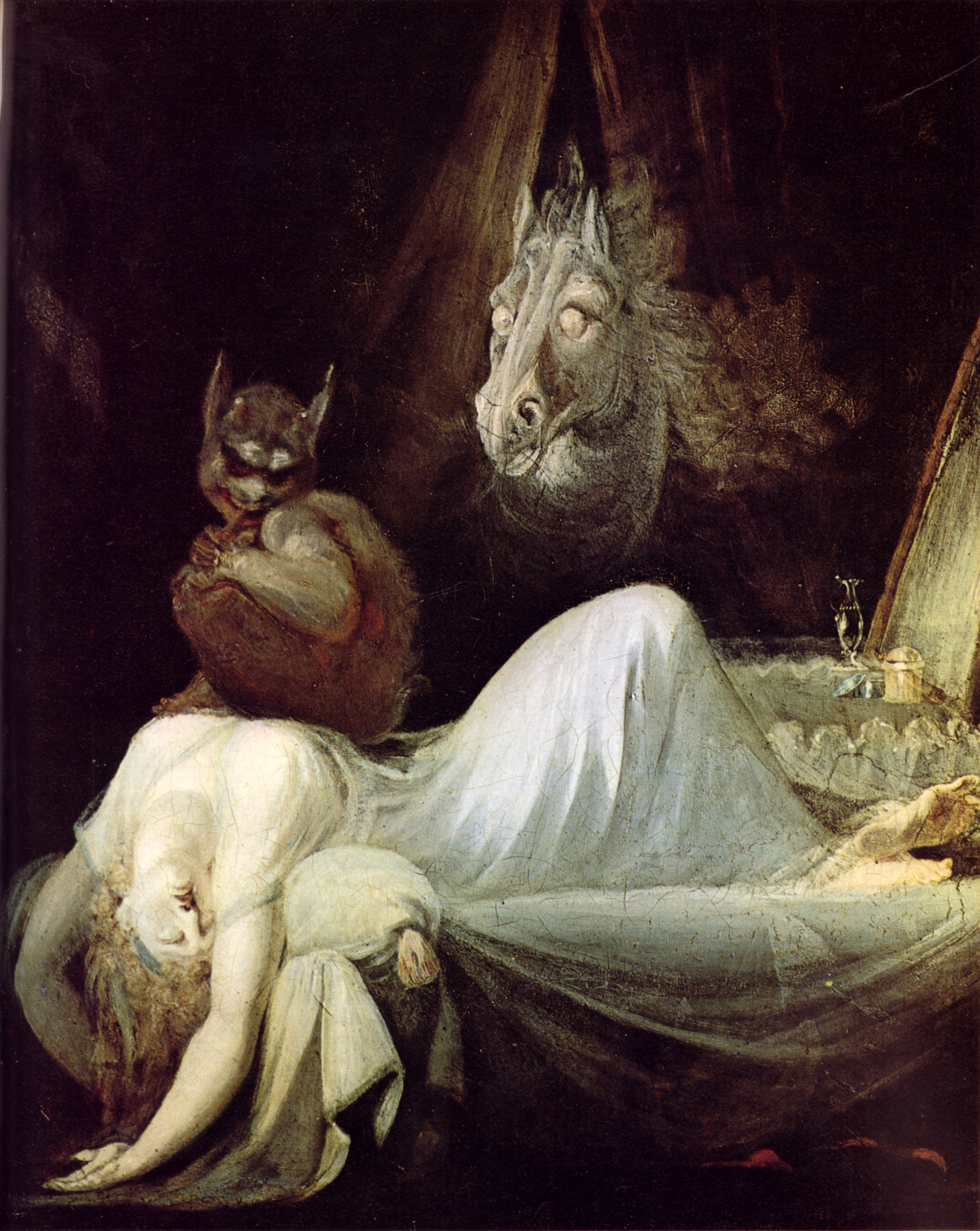
The same motif (Nachtmahr, "Nightmare"), by Johann Heinrich Füssli (1802)

In German folklore, the mare is related or analogous to the alp, a supernatural creature of similar nature; the German word for nightmare being Albtraum (lit. 'alp dream', or Alptrück (lit. 'alp pressure'). In High German, the mare is known as Mara, Mare, or Mahr (masculine noun, i.e. "der Mahr"); in Low German as mårt, Mahrt, or de môr in Pomerania and Rügen. It rides on sleepers, making it hard to breathe, or it lies over his chest, making its victim drenched with sweat, whereby the victim is able to groan but otherwise rendered speechless and spellbound, and unable to waken unless he is called by his baptismal name. While the mårt is usually a girl with a bad foot according to one source (a certain daughter of a smith in the village of Bork near Stargard having that reputation), there are tales of the môr either male or female (see below).

The môr enters a house through a hole the carpenter forgot to plug, and can be captured by plugging the hole. A male môr who had been tormenting a woman was caught by this method in one tale; he became her husband, fathering her children, but left after being told about the hole, returning just once a year. In another tale, a female môr was caught by the method of applying green paint on the hands, and the captor set her permanently on an oak which withered but always shivered. The môr also rides a horse and makes its mane matted and impossible to untangle (folklore collected from Rügen).

It is also said that to prevent a Mahrt from returning, a man who sees it after being visited should offer it a cold bowl and buttered bread for breakfast in the morning, after which she will cease to visit. Another way is boil water in a newly bought jar plugged with a new cork, at which the Mahrt will request the cork to be removed and will not come back again. (folklore of Quazow, Schlawe district, now Kwasowo, Gmina Sławno, Poland). More generally in Pomerania, an upside down pair of slippers left by the bed will ward it off.

German Folklorist Adalbert Kuhn records a Westphalian charm or prayer used to ward off mares, from Wilhelmsburg near Paderborn:

Hier leg' ich mich schlafen,
Keine Nachtmahr soll mich plagen,
Bis sie schwemmen alle Wasser,
Die auf Erden fließen,
Und tellet alle Sterne,
Die am Firmament' erscheinen!
Dazu helfe mir Gott Vater, Sohn und heiliger Geist. Amen!

Translation:

Here I am lying down to sleep;
No night-mare shall plague me
until they have swum through all the waters
that flow upon the earth,
and counted all stars
that appear in the firmament.
Thus help me God Father, Son, and Holy Ghost. Amen!

Such charms are preceded by the example of the Münchener Nachtsegen of the fourteenth century (See Elf under §Medieval and early modern German texts). Its texts demonstrate that certainly by the Late Middle Ages, the distinction between the Mare, the Alp, and the Trute (Drude) was being blurred, the Mare being described as the Alp's mother.

== Nordic folklore ==
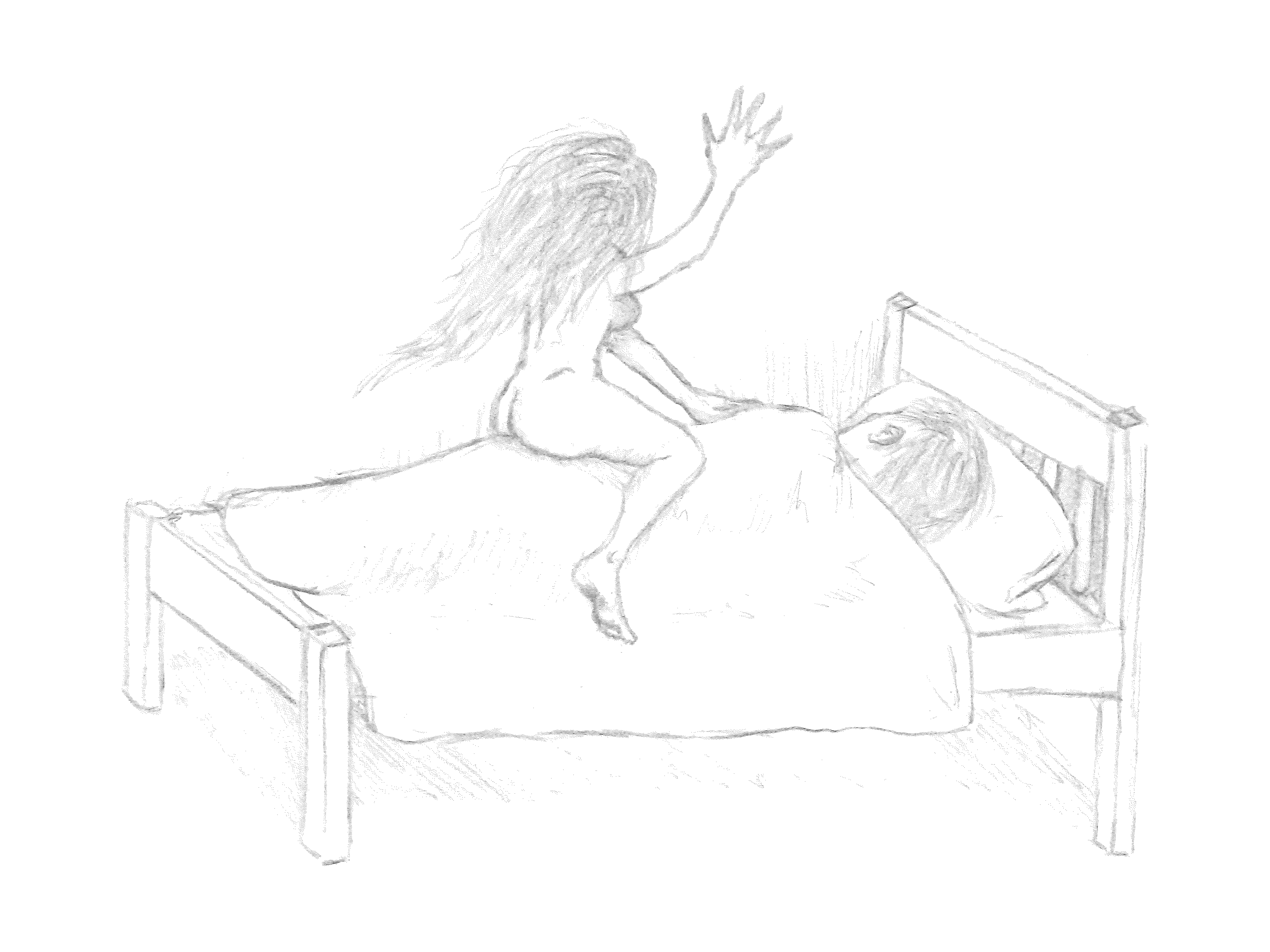
The Mare as a 'young beautiful woman', according to Scandinavian folklore, "riding" a sleeping person

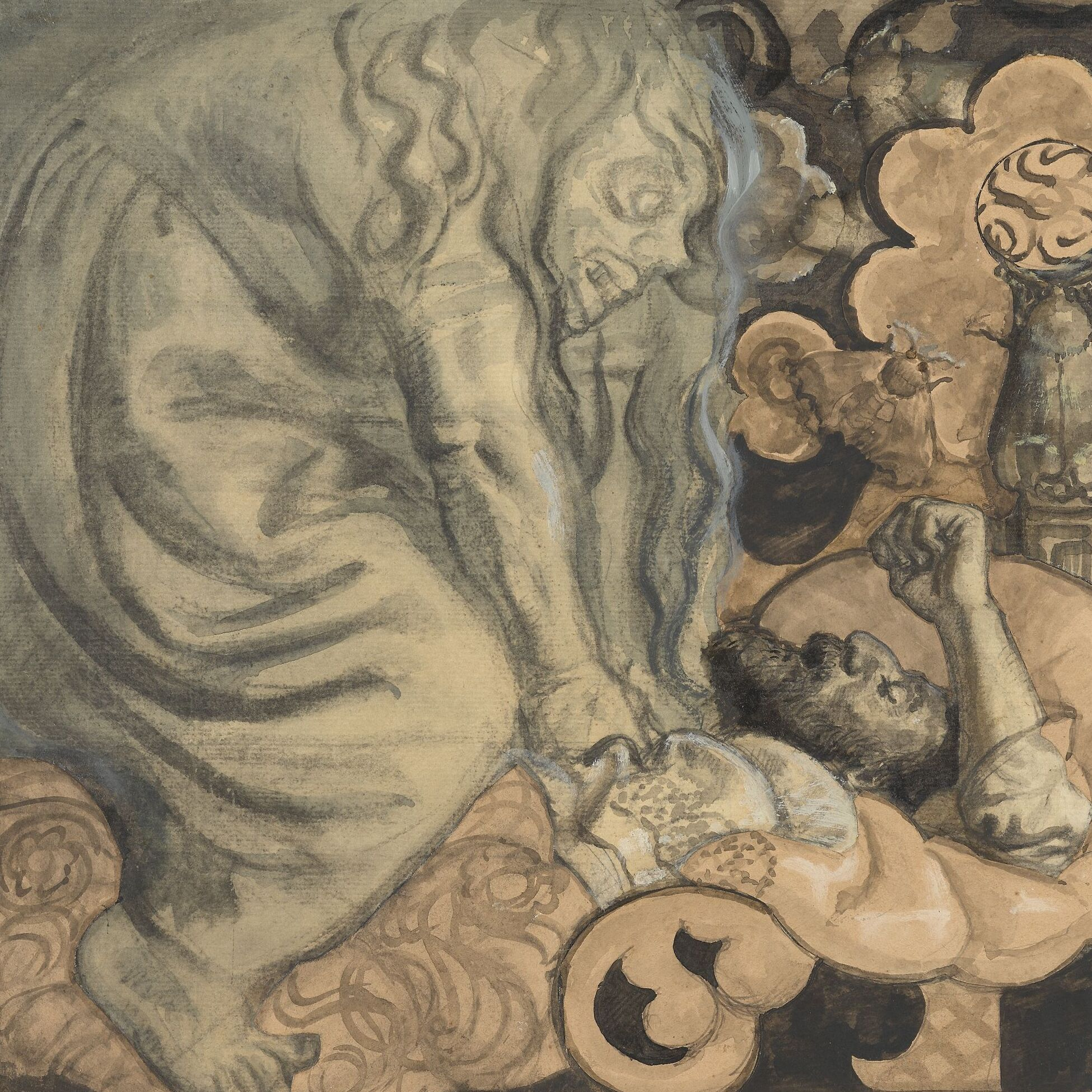
The Mare as a 'nasty older lady', according to Scandinavian folklore, "riding" a sleeping person (by Joakim Skovgaard, c. 1890)

The Scandinavian mare is normally a female being which "rides" the victims chest, called "mare riding" (Danish: mareridt, Norwegian: mareritt, Swedish: marritt), causing severe anxiety and feelings of suffocation. It assaults both people and animals, and is often said to be a young beautiful woman, although she could also be depicted as a nasty older lady. It has the ability to shapeshift, and can also appear as a man, or a furry animal, sometimes a cat, sometimes a dog; in a couple of cases, even a bird, most often an owl. The given basis for mares are many and varied. Some legends speak of mares as the soul of a person, alive or dead (see hamr), such as a sinful woman, someone wronged, or someone who died unmarried.

The mare is attested as early as in the Norse Ynglinga saga from the 13th century. Here, King Vanlandi Sveigðisson of Uppsala lost his life to a nightmare (mara) conjured by the Finnish sorceress Huld or Hulda, hired by the king's abandoned wife Drífa. The king had broken his promise to return within three years, and after ten years had elapsed the wife engaged the sorceress to either lure the king back to her, or failing that, to assassinate him. Vanlandi had scarcely gone to sleep when he complained that the nightmare "rode him"; when the men held the king's head it "trod on his legs" on the point of breaking, and when the retinue then "seized his feet", the creature fatally "pressed down on his head". In Sámi mythology, there is an evil elf called Deattán, who transforms into a bird or other animal and sits on the chests of sleeping people, giving nightmares.

According to the Vatnsdæla saga, Thorkel Silver (Þorkell Silfri) has a dream about riding a red horse that barely touched ground, which he interpreted as a positive omen, but his wife disagreed, explaining that a mare signified a man's fetch (fylgja), and that the red color boded bloodiness. This association of the nightmare with fetch is thought to be of late origin, an interpolation in the text dating to circa 1300, with the text exhibiting a "confounding of the words marr and mara."

Another possible example is the account in the Eyrbyggja saga of the sorceress Geirrid accused of assuming the shape of a "night-rider" or "ride-by-night" (marlíðendr or kveldriða) and causing serious trampling bruises on Gunnlaug Thorbjornsson. The marlíðendr mentioned here has been equated to the mara by commentators.

== Slavic folklore ==
Polish mora and Czech můra denotes both a kind of elf (alp, nightmare) as well as a moth. (Note: Grimm gives Abend-schmetterling, and specifies sphinx moth. Stallybrass adds "night butterfly" but it is dubious whether this phrase has any appreciable currency in English for the meaning "moth". Newerkla glosses Czech můra or Slavic mora, mura as meaning nachtfalter, which also means "moth".) Other Slavic languages with cognates that have the double meaning of moth are: Kashubian mòra/mora, and Slovak mora.

The Polish term nocnice attested in the 15th century means an illness condition of a child, who suffers from spasmodic crying, for which demons were sometimes blamed. (Note: The from nocznicze is given by Ostling, which he says literally means 'night ones') This is precursor to the related term nocnica referring to the adult condition of "nightmare oppression" (German: Alpdruck); note that nocnica could also mean "night moth".

In Croatian, mora refers to a 'nightmare'. Mora or Mara is one of the spirits from ancient Slav mythology, a dark one who becomes a beautiful woman to visit men in their dreams, torturing them with desire before killing them. In Serbia, a mare is called zmora or mora, or noćnik/noćnica ('night creature', masculine and feminine respectively). In Romania they were known as Moroi.

The Russian counterpart is called kikimora or hihimore, like the French name cauchemar.

Some believe that a mora enters the room through the keyhole, sits on the chest of the sleeper and tries to strangle them (hence moriti, 'to torture', 'to bother', 'to strangle', umoriti, 'to tire', 'to kill', umor, 'tiredness' and umoran, 'tired'). To repel moras, children are advised to look at the window or to turn the pillow and make the sign of the cross on it (prekrstiti jastuk); in the early 19th century, Vuk Karadžić mentions that people would repel moras by leaving a broom upside down behind their doors, or putting their belt on top of their sheets, or saying an elaborate prayer poem before they go to sleep.

=== Polish folklore ===
The Polish nightmare is known by such names as mara (around Podlachia), zmora (around Kraków). An etymological connection with Marzanna, the name of a demon/goddess of winter has been conjectured.

It could be a soul of a person, alive or dead (see hamr), such as a sinful woman, someone wronged or someone who died without confession. If a woman was promised to marry a man, but then he married another, the rejected one could also become a mare at night. A very common belief was that if the sponsor (godparent) mispronounced a prayer – e.g. Zmoraś Mario instead of Zdrowaś Mario (an inverted version of Ave Maria) at baptism, the child would become a zmora. (Note: The 17th century accused witch Katarzyna of Wojnicz administered this inverted Hail Mary attempting to heal children who suffered from "nightmare oppression" (nocnice) symptoms.)

The zmora could be recognized by the joined unibrow (żrośnięte brwi), according to the lore of the Wielkopolska (Greater Poland), including Kreis Posen (Poznań County) where a zmora of either sex is recognizable by huge black eyebrows joined in the middle above the nose. (Note: Berwiński (I, 195), as well as F. Klepaczewski, apud Lud 15 (1882).) (Note: Kmietowicz (1982) states "A man might be a Zmora from birth, in which case he had bushy, black eyebrows, growing together above his nose".) Black unibrow is ascribed to zmora or the morus (likened to a ciátow, ciátow 'witch'). Other signs of someone being a mare could be: having multicoloured eyes or a unibrow (exclusive to the Kalisz region, Poland).

The zmora by the power of the devil can shapeshift into various forms: straw, grass, a mouse, a dog, a cat, a mare, a cow, (also white shadow, leather bag, snake) or anything to disturb a person's sleep. The zmora is also called a strzyga (‘witch’, cog. strigoi), and is hard to distinguish from a normal human woman, except she prowls at night doing things she will not remember afterwards. The zmora differs from strzyga according to another account, which asserts that when the zmora dies, it dies for good, while the strzyga becomes a revenant and exhibits transformational abilities only after becoming an undead.

In a family with seven daughters and no sons. the eldest or youngest was bound to become a zmora, so it has been told. (Note: Baranowski (1965) relates the belief that "the seventh, sixth, or fifth daughter born will be a zmora (że zmorą jest każda siódma córka, względnie szósta lub nawet piąta)", but opinions differ whether sons born in between will affect this. Kmietowicz (1981) states the fifth, sixth, and seventh daughters born in a row become zmory.) Or if a pregnant woman passes through in-between two other pregnant woman, the daughter born becomes a zmora.

It is said that the zmora, once it turns to day, becomes completely unaware of her own strangling or blood-sucking activities during the night. Some say she sticks in her tongue while mounting the victim on his chest, and sucks the blood from his tongue, leaving him emaciated.

It can transform into a moth or mosquito and invade a house through cracks in the window. It is also said that the zmora must exit by the same hole it entered, and this characteristic can be exploited to capture it, as told in one tale where a jilted whore who was a zmora sneaks into the home and blood-sucks her chosen man and his wife. She was bound with a belt of St. Francis, which he converted to a halter, and she turned into a female horse and ridden by him for 7 years to her death. In a variant (also from Krakow County penned by the same woman), a farmhand marries the zmore but tests how she may suffer after plugging her conduit, only unplugging it after she is pregnant. (Note: 1. 149 and #150 possibly literary, attributed to Elżbieta Kostaśka in Modlnica.) Another variant (from Lublin County) tells of a farmhand who catches the zmora in cat-form using St. Francis's belt; it turns out to be a girl in love with him.

People believed that the mare drained people – as well as cattle and horses –of energy and/or blood at night. And not only is she a bloodsucker of men, but even a sapsucker of trees, according to Krakovian lore. (Note: Kmietowicz: "even injured and withered trees".) The ways purportedly effective for warding the stable (and perhaps home too (Note: While Golębiowski writes as if this is to protect the stable, Kolberg (1874), p. 74, footnote, allows for both human and animal protection, citing Golębiowski and Tomasz Wolicki "Nauka dla włościan", p, 175 for describing the same protection.)) are hanging a slaughtered magpie (sroka), inviting the mare for breakfast, (Note: In a variant, the promise of bread or butter the next day must be fulfilled when a strange woman or little girl comes in the morning, otherwise the consequences will be dire) cutting off a string from the doorknob, sticking an awl in the door, or putting a broom and an axe crosswise on the threshold (or a broom in the bedroom to ward it off). To protect livestock, some people hung mirrors over the manger (to scare the mare with its own face) or sometimes the horses were given red ribbons, or covered in a stinking substance.

Other protection practices include:

- drinking coffee before sleeping,
- taking the mare's hat,
- throwing a piece of a noose at the demon,
- sleeping with a leather, wedding belt or a scythe,
- changing one's sleeping position,
- smearing feces on the front door,
- leaving a bundle of hay in one's bed and going to sleep in another room.

== See also ==
- Alp (folklore)
- Basty
- Batibat
- Enchanted Moura
- Ghosts in Thai culture
- Incubus
- Lietuvēns
- Madam Koi Koi
- Mara (demon)
- Marzanna (Slavic goddess of death and winter)
- Maya (illusion)
- Moroi
- Moros
- Mouros
- Night hag
- Nightmare
- Pesanta
- Sleep paralysis, medical term for the condition the mare is thought to originate from.
- Slavic fairies
- Succubus

Fiction:

- Paranormal Entity, a 2009 found-footage film featuring a mare named Maron as the antagonist
- Marianne, a 2011 Swedish horror film featuring mares
- Borgman, a 2013 Dutch thriller film featuring mares
- Outlast, a 2013 video game featuring Mares/Alps
- Hilda, a 2018 Netflix animated series. The Season 1 Episode "The Nightmare Spirit" focuses on a Mare
- Mara, a 2018 American horror film
- Phasmophobia, a 2020 video game featuring Mares
