= Al (folklore) =

Demon of childbirth in certain Asian folk traditions

Al or Hal (Azerbaijani: al arvadi, Persian: آل; Armenian: Ալ, Ալք; Mongolian: Гал, Qal; Oirat: Һал; Russian: Алы) is a class of demon in the folklore of the Caucasus, Armenia, Iran and Central Asia. Als are demons of childbirth, interfering with human reproduction. The al is known by various other names, including alk in Armenian and Kurdish, ol, hāl and xāl in Tajikistan and Afghanistan, almasti or albasti in Central Asian Turkic-speaking countries, and halmasti among the Dards. The al is first documented in European literature in the middle of the 19th century.

== Names ==
- Armenian: Ալ or Ալք (Al or Alk)
- Lezgian: Ал (Al)
- Georgian: ალი (Ali)
- Tat: Ол (Ol)
- Talysh: Ала (Ala)
- Udi: Һал (hal)
- Kurdish: Alk or Hal
- Turkmen: Al
- Persian: آل (Āl)

== Traditions ==
=== Armenian ===
In Armenian tradition, the all steal the lung, liver and heart of women in childbirth, pregnant women, and women who have just given birth. They also destroy embryos in the womb, causing miscarriage, and can steal babies forty days after childbirth, replacing them with imps. They are male and female. They have clay noses and fiery eyes, and "appear with sharp fangs, disheveled hair, copper claws, iron teeth, the tusks of a wild boar and sagging breasts, resembling a crone." After stealing the organs of a woman, the al attempts to escape and cross the first source of water, after which the woman cannot be saved. Apotropaic wards against als include methods used against other demons (such as charms, prayers, iron objects, onions, and garlic), and preventing the al from reaching water.

=== Iranian ===
In Iran, the al is "a bony, thin old woman, with a clay nose, red face, and a straw or reedy basket hanging from its shoulder, in which the liver or lung of the young mother is placed." In Central Asia, the al is customarily "a fat, ugly and hairy crone with sagging breasts, the one hanging over one shoulder, while hanging over her other shoulder is a woolen bag ... in which she has placed the heart and liver of her victim." God created an al for Adam's first consort, but the earth-born Adam couldn't adapt to the al's fiery nature; this is the origin of the enmity between the al and Eve and her daughters.

== See also ==
- Abyzou
- Lamia
- Lilith
