= Lietuvēns =

Mythological creature in Latvian folklore

Lietuvēns or lietonis (in Latgale also can be called “lītūņš”, similar to Slavic mara (Russian: Мара) or Lithuanian “lauma”) is a mythological creature in Latvian folklore. According to Latvian folk epics and omens, lietuvēns is the soul of a murdered (strangled, drowned or hanged) person cursed to live in this world as long as it has been meant to live. By some beliefs, it is the soul of an unbaptized child. It attacks both people and domestic animals. Sleep paralysis is thought to be torture or strangling by a lietuvēns. When under attack, one must move the toe of the left foot to get rid of the attacker. It is also said that lietuvēns is able to penetrate into houses, even through keyholes and, aside from nightmares, can strangle the victim.

== Appearance ==
In Latvian folk culture, lietuvēns is usually described as a labored wretched child. It is small in height, moves fast, and comes at noon or night. Sometimes, but rarely, it turns into ugly vicious women reminiscent of a witch. It always leaves through the same place: where it entered. Commonly it’s some hole or crack in the wall; also it can be a keyhole or slot in the door.

Moreover, old omens also say that lietuvēns rides and strangles sleeping people or domestic animals (cases about horses and cows are described in folklore more often). A victim rapidly gets tired, loses strength, and gets covered in sweat because of such tortures. Absolutely weakened, sometimes the victim is able to see just a bit of lietuvēns and feel that it is lying on top with all its weight and doesn’t give any opportunity to move or run away. It becomes harder to breathe and eventually lietuvēns leaves, leaving his victim on the verge of death.

However, in Latvian folklore, it is mentioned that lietuvēns doesn’t torture animals and people who were born in the daytime.

== Methods of protection ==
According to folk traditions, there are some methods to get rid of lietuvēns.

=== Lietuvēns's cross ===
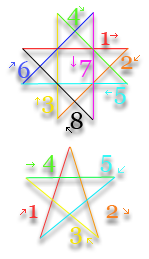
Double and simple lietuvēns’ cross

In the fight against lietuvēns the most important role is played by so-called lietuvēns’ cross (Latvian: lietuvēna krusts) that can be two types - simple and double. Simple looks like a five-pointed star (pentagram) and double or big cross looks like two pentagrams put together (in Latvia it can be also named auseklis). Particularly auseklis symbolizes the morning star, the victory of light in the battle against darkness. Lietuvēns’ cross in general stands for safety, protects against ghosts and, especially, lietuvēns, but auseklis is considered to be the strongest variant of the lietuvēns’ cross. Such crosses can be often seen on doors, thresholds, windows and other things. It can be drawn also on cows’ and horses’ hoofs, and even people, who suffer from lietuvēns, draw lietuvēns’ cross on their nails.

Very significant thing about this method is that lietuvēns’ cross has to be drawn in one step, otherwise it won’t work and lietuvēns can come even in the house, where this cross is drawn. Also, correctly drawn lietuvēns’ cross works until the person, who did it, doesn’t erase it.

=== Fix the hole where lietuvēns comes from ===
The hole, crack or keyhole, which is entrance for lietuvēns, has to be fixed with a piece of mottled wood. It should be cut with left hand and brought to the house with a thick part first. Everything has to be done at night when a lietuvēns has already come in. Without finding an exit, the creature often turns into a beautiful young woman and stays in the house while the exit is closed. But just as it opens, the lady immediately escapes.

=== Move a toe ===
When under attack, a person must move the pinky or big toe of the left foot to get rid of the lietuvēns. It instantly runs away.

=== Find lietuvēns’ body and bury with honors ===
If lietuvēns’ bones are buried in the cemetery with honors, then its soul won’t ever bother anyone else again. In the moment of burying, a thunderstorm rises and lightning strikes, so it means that the poor lost soul is taken to another world.

== Protection of farm animals ==
The best protection is lietuvēns’ cross, but there also exist other ways how to get rid of this creature. Farm animals can be protected from lietuvēns with a knife, comb, or scythe attached to their back. In that case, lietuvēns can be hurt by blades or sharp objects. The creature also might be caught in a moment of confusion, but only behind the animal’s left ear. In that moment, it is suggested to hit him with a rowan stick, so it will run away and won’t come back.

For lietuvēns it could be hard to get the animal if its back is oiled. It will be greasy, so the creature won’t be able to ride an animal. As well as by some reasons lietuvēns tries to avoid animals with a cut right ear.

== See also ==
- Malevolent spirit
- Pesanta
- Batibat
