= David Hufford =

American folklorist and ethnographer

David J. Hufford is an American folklorist and ethnographer known for his research on paranormal phenomena and sleep paralysis. He is professor emeritus of Humanities and Psychiatry at Penn State University College of Medicine, and the former chair of Medical Humanities.

== Career ==
Hufford attributed his interest in sleep paralysis to a personal experience he had with it as a student in 1963. He later went to study at the Memorial University of Newfoundland, where he became fascinated with the local belief in the "Old Hag", which mirrored his earlier sleep paralysis experience. This led him to question whether the folkloric belief was based solely in cultural beliefs, or whether it was informed by personal experiences. In 1974, he joined the faculty of Penn State University College of Medicine.

Hufford is credited with pioneering "an experience-centered approach to supernatural belief" in ethnographic study. He took the position that the dismissal of folkloric traditions as inherently irrational was ethnocentric. He was a proponent of the idea that any distinction between objective knowledge and subjective "beliefs" should be understood as a value judgement. He described this bias towards folklore in the formula: "What I know I know, what you know you only believe."

His research in the 1970s reassessed previous positions on sleep paralysis and explored its relation to reported paranormal phenomenon. He theorized that the "Old Hag" archetype common to folklore around the world was based on common experiences of sleep paralysis, which tended to manifest in similar ways. In 1983, he published The Terror that Comes in the Night: An Experience-Centered Study of Supernatural Assault Traditions. The book was well received, with praise for Hufford's approach to the ethnography of folklore.

At Penn State, Hufford became chair of Medical Humanities, and professor of Neural & Behavioral Science, and Family & Community Medicine. He left this position in 2007, becoming professor emeritus of Humanities and Psychiatry at Penn State College of Medicine. He is also director of the Doctors Kienle Center for Humanistic Medicine. Hufford is a fellow of the American Folklore Society.

== List of works ==
=== Books ===
- Hufford, David J (1982). The terror that comes in the night : an experience-centered study of supernatural assault traditions. Philadelphia: University of Pennsylvania Press. ISBN 9780812213058.
- Bergner, Paul; Hufford, David; DerMarderosian, Ara (1998). Country doctor's book of folk remedies & healing wisdom. Lincolnwood, Ill.: Publications International. ISBN 9780785328315.
- Pittman, Michael; Hufford, David (2010). Hagridden. Grand Falls-Windsor, NL: Michael Pittman. ISBN 9780986607318.

=== Pamphlets and book chapters ===
- Hufford, David (1974). Folktale and Legend in Newfoundland. Newfoundland Historical Society.
- Hufford, David; Rosenberg, Neil V. Conception Bay, Newfoundland: Change and Continuity in Folklore.
- Hufford, David (1976). A New Approach to the "Old Hag": The Nightmare Tradition Reexamined. University of California Press.
- Hufford, David J. (1995). "Beings Without Bodies: An Experience-Centered Theory of the Belief in Spirits". Out of the Ordinary. University Press of Colorado. pp. 11–45. doi:10.2307/j.ctt46nwn8.6. ISBN 978-0-87421-191-7. JSTOR j.ctt46nwn8.6.
- Hufford, David; Bucklin, Mary Ann (2006). "The Spirit of Spiritual Healing in the United States". In Koss-Chioino, Joan; Hefner, Philip (eds.). Spiritual transformation and healing: anthropological, theological, neuroscientific, and clinical perspectives. Lanham, MD: AltaMira Press. ISBN 9780759108677.
