= Basty =

Evil spirit in Turkic folklore

A Basty or Bastı (Azerbaijani: Basdı) is an evil spirit or goblin in Turkic folklore. There are different types of Basty in Anatolia: Al-Basty, Kara-Basty, Kul-Basty, Sary-Basty:

1. Al-basty: It is a tall, white-skinned and evil, naked female creature.
2. Kara-basty: It is a nightmare daemon.
3. Qul-basty: It sleeps during the day in his grave and travels at night. Portrayed as a hairy and smelly.
4. Sary-basty: It is a woman dressed in yellow. Makes epilepsy disease.

== See also ==
- Al Basty
- Hag in folklore
- Mare (folklore)
- Mora (mythology)
- Moroi (folklore)
