= Batibat =

Philippine mythical creature

Creature information
- Other name: Bangungot
- Grouping: Philippine folklore demon

Origin
- Region: Ilocos, Tagalog

The batibat is a vengeful demon found in Ilocano folklore. In Tagalog folklore, the creature is called bangungot. The batibat takes the form of an ancient, grotesquely obese, tree-dwelling female spirit. They usually come in contact with humans when the trees in which they reside are felled and are made homeless, especially when their tree is made into a support post for a house. This causes them to migrate and inhabit what is left of their tree. The batibat forbids humans from sleeping near its post. When a person does sleep near it, the batibat transforms into its true form and attacks the person by suffocating their victim and invading their dream space, causing sleep paralysis and waking nightmares. This condition lends itself to the Ilocano word for nightmare, "batíbat" (or bangungot in Tagalog). To ward off the batibat, one should bite one's thumb or wiggle one's toes. In this way, the person will awaken from the nightmare induced by the batibat.

== In popular culture ==
- The creature appears in the fifth episode of the Netflix series Chilling Adventures of Sabrina, played by Megan Leitch. This version of Batibat is depicted in the episode "Dreams in a Witch House" as a demon that is unintentionally released by Sabrina Spellman from a puzzle belonging to her father. Trapped in the house, Batibat proceeds to vengefully torment the Spellman family by inducing their dream states. The demon preys on their nightmares in the hopes that one of them will free her from the house, but is ultimately thwarted by Sabrina and Mary Wardwell / Madam Satan.
- A Batibat named Maganda is referenced in the eleventh episode of Lost Girl's second season, titled "Can't see the Fae-Rest" as a Balinese tree nymph.
- The 2020 horror film Evil Takes Root: The Curse of the Batibat features one of these creatures.
- The 2026 DreamWorks Animation film Forgotten Island has a creature named Batiba, voiced by Jenny Slate.

== See also ==
- Brugada syndrome
- Incubus
- Lietuvēns
- Pesanta
- Sleep apnea
- Sleep paralysis
