= Succubus =

Mythological demoness who seduces men

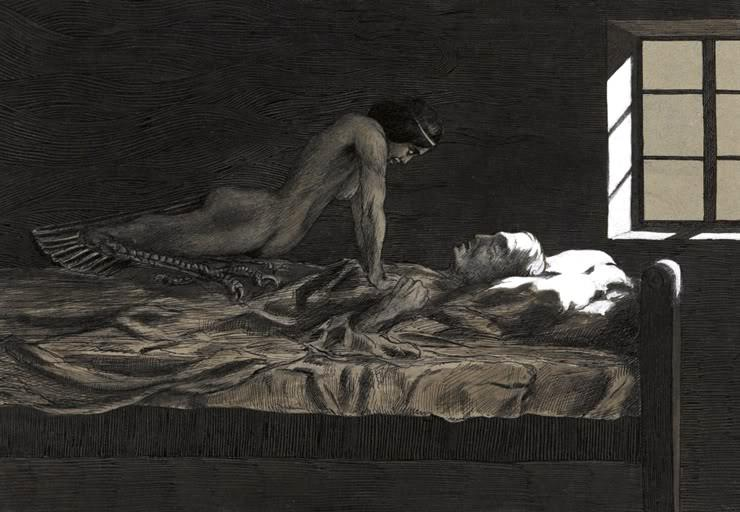
Depiction of a succubus in "My Dream, My Bad Dream" by Fritz Schwimbeck, 1915

A succubus (pl. succubi) is a female demon who was described in various European folklore as appearing in the dreams of male humans in order to seduce them. Repeated interactions between a succubus and a man will lead to sexual activity. The establishment and perpetuation of such a relationship enables the production of a hybrid child known as a cambion, but at the expense of the man, whose mental and physical health will deteriorate rapidly, eventually resulting in his death if the succubus continues courting him for a protracted period.

In modern representations, a succubus is often depicted as a beautiful woman seductress or charming, rather than as demonic or frightening, to attract people instead of repulsing them. The male counterpart of the succubus is the incubus. Historically, folkloric belief in succubi was motivated by distressing nighttime phenomena, chiefly wet dreams and sleep paralysis.

In medieval Europe, union of an incubus or succubus and a human was supposed by some to result in the birth of beings half-demon and half-human children. Legendary magician Merlin was said to have been fathered by an incubus.

== Etymology ==
The term derives from Late Latin succuba "paramour" from succubare "to lie beneath" (sub- "under" and cubare "to lie"), used to describe this being's implied sexual position relative to the sleeper's position. The English word "succubus" dates from the late 14th century. The succubus is also known as the earth wanderer.

== In folklore ==
A succubus may take the form of a beautiful woman, but closer inspection may reveal deformities of her body, such as bird-like claws or serpentine tails. Folklore also describes men being forced to perform the act of cunnilingus. In later folklore, a succubus took the form of a siren.

Throughout history, priests and rabbis, including Hanina ben Dosa and Abaye, tried to curb the power of succubi over humans.

== Ability to reproduce ==
According to the Malleus Maleficarum, or Witches' Hammer, written by Heinrich Kramer (Institor) in 1486, succubi collect semen from men they seduce. Incubi, or male demons, then use the semen to impregnate human females, thus explaining how demons could apparently sire children, despite the traditional belief that they were incapable of reproduction. Children so begotten—cambions—were supposed to be those that were born deformed, or more susceptible to supernatural influences.

King James in his dissertation titled Dæmonologie refutes the possibility for angelic entities to reproduce and instead offered a suggestion that a devil would carry out two methods of impregnating women - the first, to steal the sperm out of a dead man and deliver it into a woman. If a demon could not extract the semen quickly, the substance could not be instantly transported to a female host, causing it to go cold. This explains his view that succubi and incubi were the same demonic entity, only to be described differently based on the tormented sexes being conversed with. The second method was the idea that a dead body could be possessed by a devil, causing it to rise and have sexual relations with others. However, no mention has been found of a female corpse being possessed to elicit sex from men.

== See also ==
- Incubus
- List of mythological creatures
- List of succubi in fiction
