= Vampires in popular culture =

Vampirism in modern media

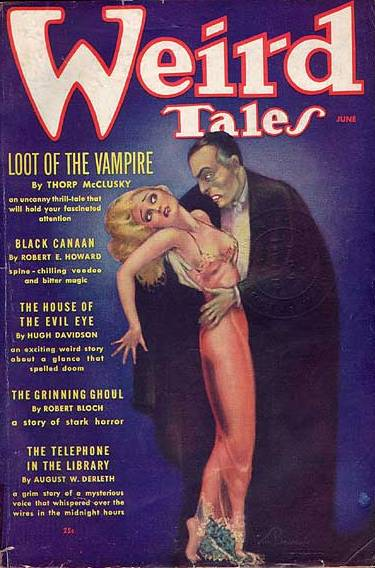
There is an entire genre of literature dedicated to vampires.

Vampires are frequently represented in popular culture across various forms of media, including appearances in ballet, films, literature, music, opera, radio, theatre, paintings, and video games.

Though there are diverse and creative interpretations and depictions of vampires, the common defining trait is their consumption of blood for sustenance. They are represented using different mediums, including comic books, films, games. Examples of notable vampire-themed works, span from classic films like Nosferatu, to modern franchises like The Twilight Saga and Underworld. The role of vampires in role-playing games, particularly Dungeons & Dragons and Vampire: The Masquerade, is noteworthy. Vampires appear in vampire-themed manga and TV shows.

== Comic books and graphic novels ==
Vampirella #1 (September 1969). Cover art by Frank Frazetta.

- Comic books and graphic novels such as Vampirella (1969), Tomb of Dracula (1972), Blade (1973), 30 Days of Night (2002) Anita Blake Guilty Pleasures, and Dracula vs. King Arthur (2005). In addition, many major superheroes have faced vampire supervillains at some point.
- Many comic books featuring Buffy the Vampire Slayer and its spin off Angel have been released.
- Marceline and the Scream Queens is a mini-series of comic books focusing on Marceline the Vampire Queen from the Cartoon Network show Adventure Time. The spin-off comic was produced by BOOM! Studios and published between July and December 2012.

== Films ==
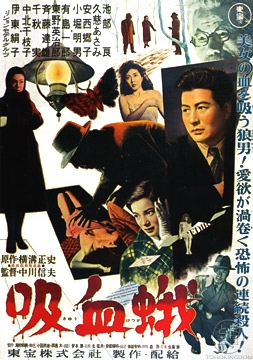
The 1956 Vampire Moth was the first Japanese film in the vampire genre.

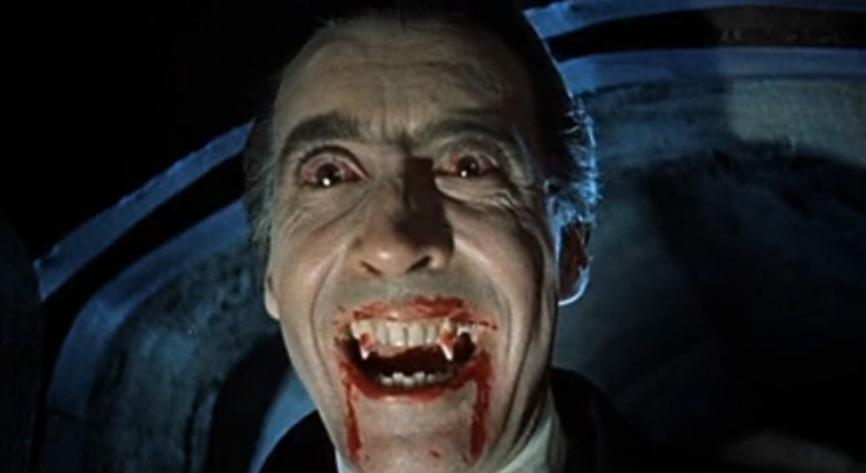
Christopher Lee portrayed Count Dracula in the celebrated Hammer Horror series of films, starting with Dracula in 1958.

The Vampire (1913, directed by Robert G. Vignola), also co-written by Vignola, is the earliest vampire film.

These were derived from the writer Rudyard Kipling who was inspired by a vampiress painted by Philip Burne-Jones, an image typical of the era in 1897, to write his poem 'The Vampire'. Like much of Kipling's verse it was incredibly popular, and its refrain: A fool there was . . . , describing a seduced man, became the title of the popular film A Fool There Was that made Theda Bara a star, the poem being used in its publicity. On this account, in early American slang the femme fatale was called a vamp, short for vampiress.

A vampire features in the landmark Nosferatu (1922 Germany, directed by Friedrich Wilhelm Murnau), an unlicensed version of Bram Stoker's Dracula. The Stoker estate sued the production and won, leading to the destruction of most copies of the film. It would be painstakingly restored in 1994 by a team of European scholars from the five surviving prints that had escaped destruction. Nosferatu is the first film to feature a Vampire's death by sunlight, which formerly only weakened vampires.

The next classic treatment of the vampire legend was in Universal's Dracula starring Bela Lugosi as Count Dracula. Five years after the release of the film, Universal released Dracula's Daughter, a direct sequel that starts immediately after the end of the first film. A second sequel, Son of Dracula, starring Lon Chaney Jr. followed in 1943. Despite his apparent death in the 1931 film, the Count returned to life in three more Universal films of the mid-1940s: 1944's House of Frankenstein, 1945's House of Dracula and 1948's Abbott and Costello Meet Frankenstein. While Lugosi had played a vampire in two other movies during the 1930s and 1940s, it was only in this final film that he played Count Dracula onscreen for the second (and last) time.

Dracula was reincarnated for a new generation in the celebrated Hammer Horror series of films, starring Christopher Lee as the Count. The first of these films Dracula (1958) was followed by seven sequels. Lee returned as Dracula in all but two of these.

A distinct subgenre of vampire films, ultimately inspired by Le Fanu's Carmilla explored the topic of the lesbian vampire. The first of these was Blood and Roses (1960) by Roger Vadim. More explicit lesbian content was provided in Hammer Studios Karnstein trilogy. The first of these, The Vampire Lovers, (1970), starring Ingrid Pitt and Peter Cushing, was a relatively straightforward re-telling of LeFanu's novella, but with more overt violence and sexuality. Later films in this subgenre such as Vampyres (1974) became even more explicit in their depiction of sex, nudity and violence.

Beginning with the absurd Abbott and Costello Meet Frankenstein (1948) the vampire film has often been the subject of comedy. The Fearless Vampire Killers (1967) by Academy Award winner Roman Polanski was a notable parody of the genre. Other comedic treatments, of variable quality, include Old Dracula (1974) featuring David Niven as a lovelorn Dracula, Love at First Bite (1979 United States) featuring George Hamilton and Dracula: Dead and Loving It (1995 United States, directed by Mel Brooks) with Canadian Leslie Nielsen giving it a comic twist.

Another development in some vampire films has been a change from supernatural horror to science fictional explanations of vampirism. The Last Man on Earth (Italy 1964, directed by Ubaldo Ragona) and The Omega Man (1971 USA, directed by Boris Sagal), both based on Richard Matheson's novel I Am Legend, are two examples. Vampirism is explained as a kind of virus in David Cronenberg's Rabid (1976 Canada), Red-Blooded American Girl (1990 Canada, directed by David Blyth) and Michael and Peter Spierig's Daybreakers (2009 United States).

Race has been another theme, as exemplified by the blaxploitation picture Blacula (1972) and several sequels.

Since the time of Bela Lugosi's Dracula (1931) the vampire, male or female, has usually been portrayed as an alluring sex symbol. There is, however, a very small subgenre, pioneered in Murnau's seminal Nosferatu (1922) in which the vampire is depicted in the hideous lineaments of the creature of European folklore. Max Schrek's disturbing portrayal of this role in Murnau's film was copied by Klaus Kinski in Werner Herzog's remake Nosferatu: Phantom der Nacht (1979). In Shadow of the Vampire (2000, directed by E. Elias Merhige), Willem Dafoe plays Max Schrek, himself, though portrayed here as an actual vampire.

A major character in most vampire films is the vampire slayer, of which Stoker's Abraham Van Helsing is a prototype. However, killing vampires has changed. Where Van Helsing relied on a stake through the heart, in Vampires 1998 USA, directed by John Carpenter, Jack Crow (James Woods) has a heavily armed squad of vampire hunters, and in Buffy the Vampire Slayer (1992 USA, directed by Fran Rubel Kuzui), writer Joss Whedon (who created TV's Buffy the Vampire Slayer and spinoff Angel) attached The Slayer, Buffy Summers (Kristy Swanson in the film, Sarah Michelle Gellar in the TV series), to a network of Watchers and mystically endowed her with superhuman powers.

The 1973 Serbian horror film Leptirica ("The She-Butterfly") was inspired by the story of Sava Savanović.

Other notable Vampire movies include:

- Dracula (1931) starred Bela Lugosi as well he starred in "Vampire Over London" (1952) both of which are B/W films.
- The Horror of Dracula (1958) starring Peter Cushing (playing Dr. Van Helsing) and co-stars with Christopher Lee. Christopher Lee's saga of vampire films also includes the following as he personified Dracula in Dracula: Prince of Darkness (1966), Dracula Had Risen From the Grave (1968), Count Dracula plus Taste the Blood of Dracula and Scars of Dracula, all in (1970). Followed up with Dracula A.D. 1972 (1972) -co-starring again with Peter Cushing, as Van Helsing- then The Satanic Rites Of Dracula with Peter Cushing (1973), and Dracula and Son (1976). While Peter Cushing was also in Vampire Lovers (1970), The Legend of the 7 Golden Vampires and Tender Dracula (1974).
- Atom Age Vampire (1960) B/W film aka "Seddok, l'erede di Satana" starring Alberto Lupo, Susanne Loret, and Sergio Fantoni. Directed by Anton Giulo Majano with both an Italian and English version of this film released. A 70-minute cartoon animated version of this film reflecting its story line was released in 2009.
- Queen of Blood (1966) starring John Saxon and Basil Rathbone. This shared the element of a derelict spaceship harboring a female vampiric alien with the 1985 sci-fi thriller Lifeforce.
- Requiem for a Vampire (1971) while a mainstream film not widely shown due to its dubious odd-ball content, the film containing full frontal nudity regarding a bizarre tale that includes bats engaged in coitus with women. This film starred Marie-Pierre Castel, Mireille Dargent, and Piilippe Gaste.
- Horror Express (1972) is not a vampire movie in the eyes of some, and then again it is a vampire film in the eyes of others. Like the movie "Lifeforce" that breaks the mold of one's lifeforce or i.e. blood being drawn from a person by biting them, mysteriously drawn from their mouths, or as in this film a person's soul or spirit if you will is removed from them leaving them dead with their essence all that they were being drawn out through their eyes... This film has a sinister character, call him vampiric or prehistoric man, or demon or devil if you will! The idea is not rightly spelled out with this sinister character attacking passengers aboard a rail road passenger train (an idea that appears likewise to be shared to some degree in Guillermo del Toro and Chuck Hogan's "The Strain" with its original vampire character -in this horror TV series- bearing the marks of the devil too, if you will). "Horror Express" stars Peter Cushing, Telly Savalas, and Christopher Lee.
- Captain Kronos - Vampire Hunter (1974) featuring Caroline Munro (in the starring role as Carla) in this UK film which also starred (Captain Kronos) Horst Janson, (Dr. Marcus) John Carson, (Grost) John Cater; as well as Shane Briant as (Paul Durwood), and others.
- Nosferatu the Vampyre (1979) "Werner Herzog's Nosferatue, the Vampyre portrayed by Klaus Kinski as Count Dracula a well meaning replica of Max Schreck's vampire in F.W. Murnau's Nosferatu. As well Shadow of the Vampire (2000) picked up the gauntlet and went further being inspired by the classic too in its attempt to pay homage to F.W. Murnau's silent horror classic Nosferatu, while including comic elements to the classic. All of which is also outlined above.
- A TV film called Salem's Lot (1979) was made starring David Soul, who was more popularly known from his TV series Starsky and Hutch (1975-1979). This movie was then again remade in 2004, starring Rob Lowe.
- Lifeforce (1985) contained a lot of nudity throughout the film as a female vampire seduces and kisses men to drain out their life force and leaves them dried out like some mummified corpses. This film has different bases for vampire folklore and has them seeded here from another planet coming here on a spaceship. Starred Steven Railsback and Mathilda May.
- One of the first popular vampire films of its decade there came out at the theaters a movie called "Lost Boys" in (1987) which quickly became a teen hearttrob film of girls at the time. It starred Corey Haim, Kiefer Sutherland, and Jason Patric.
- Near Dark (1987) starred both Bill Paxton and Lance Henriksen then in (2009) Lance did another vampire movie that shared a similar plot twist although the film itself with respect to the entirety of the script was different. However, if you've seen Near Dark this second film may not hold as much of a novelty as far as the plot twist goes; or vice versa if you've seen Daybreakers Lance's second vampire movie before Near Dark. Both of these actors Bill Paxton and Lance Henriksen have also prominently starred together in the 1986 sci-fi film Aliens.
- Bram Stoker's Dracula (1992). This film is based on the 1897 book. The film starred Gary Oldman, Winona Ryder, Keanu Reeves and Anthony Hopkins.
- Innocent Blood (1992) contains brief nudity in a scene in opening of the feature in its theatrical release. The film is what is considered a 'dark comedy' with the female vampire having a moral angle to kill only bad people, and thus her involvement with the mob. This film starred: Anne Parillaud (Marie the vampire), David Proval (Lenny), Robert Luggia (Sal "The Shark"), Rocco Sisto (Gilly), Chazz Palminteri (Tony), Anthony LaPaglia (Joe Gennaro), Don Rickless (Emanuel Bergman), and Christopher Lee (as Count Dracula).
- A somewhat more popular of the light-hearted vampire films was Buffy the Vampire Slayer in (1992), featuring a high school girl who found herself gifted with fighting skills to kill vampires, and its spinoff TV series mentioned above.
- Interview With the Vampire (1994) starred Tom Cruise with Brad Pitt, and co-starred actors Antonio Banderas, Kirsten Dunst & Christian Slater. (This film is based on an Anne Rice book as is also the movie Queen of the Damned mentioned below).
- Embrace of a Vampire (1995) a cable TV movie contains some nudity involving a human and her vampire lover with the human girl being played by Alyssa Milano in her most revealing role.
- From Dusk till Dawn (1996) over the top Quentin Tarantino film story which inspired a sequel film and in 2014 inspired a TV series spinoff. This movie was notably starring Salma Hayek, George Clooney, Cheech Marin, Danny Trejo, Harvey Keitel, and John Saxon.
- The Blade (1998) saga of three films starring Wesley Snipes, one begins to noticeably see a change in the genre of what has been considered the original origins of vampires in popular culture (from that of its original folklore).
- Queen of the Damned (2002) regarding a queen vampire played by the beautiful and late actress Aaliyah. Part of the film's plot deals with a rockstar vampire named Lestat (Stuart Townsend) whose music wakes up the Queen of the damned. The film is based on Anne Rice novels called "The Vampire Chronicles" with the one bearing the title of this movie was published in 1988. Her writings are also responsible for the film "Interview with the Vampire" and the book by the same title was published in 1976 the first of her vampire book series.
- Underworld (2003) with its saga of films - are very popular including a story line of wolf Lycans fighting vampires in a well brushed out visuals and CGI effects not completely unlike The Twilight Saga of films that likewise have the same conflict occurring between rivaling factions of wolves and vampires. Starring Kate Beckinsale as the leding role in this series of movies.
- Van Helsing (2004) starred Hugh Jackman and Kate Beckinsale (more popularly known in the Sci-fi community for her portrayal of Selene in the "Underworld" saga of films); while this films is said to get a remake starring Tom Cruise.
- 30 Days of Night (2007) film directed by David Slade about an Alaskan town plunged into darkness with the misfortune of there being vampires there and all mayhem breaks out.
- I Am Legend (2007) film starring Will Smith with a sequel in the works. Original film is called "The Last Man on Earth" starring Vincent Price available in its original B/W release or now in a colorized version as well. A more well known first remake was "Omega Man" starring Charlton Heston, or which inspired "I Am Legend" film that contained vampires as well as dog vampires all of which had slight zombie features too. These films are all from a book by the title of this film outlined here; and none of the films follow what is contained in the last couple of pages of the book. Another interesting point to note in the "Omega Man" film we find Chuck a white gentleman being the last man on earth as he meets his love interest, or passion a black woman (Rosalind Cash) the last woman on earth that has not become infected with the virus as is the rest of humanity. While in the film version of "I Am Legend" Will Smith a black man meets a Latina women, who is the last woman apparently on earth; and they don't really get along very well. There is a DVD of "I Am Legend" which includes an alternative ending version.
- The Twilight Saga films beginning in (2008) which also featured Native American flashbacks in time as the film deals with what it calls werewolves (but would be technically 'skinwalkers') verses or in conflict with a vampire clan with one of each of them, a vampire (Robert Pattinson) playing Edward Cullen, and Native American changeling (Taylor Lautner) bidding for the hand of a mortal girl Bella Swan (Kristen Stewart). Notably there are other Native American actors in this saga of films besides Lautner with Native ancestry of (Ottawa and Potawatomi tribes, on his mother's side) playing Jacob Black, they -other natives- include Gil Birmingham (Comanche) who played Billy Black, and Julia Jones (Choctaw and Chickasaw) who played Leah Clearwater. A difference in vampires portrayed in these films (and the book series) is that they don't burn up in the sun—their skin sparkles. They live in Washington because it is almost always overcast, so their secret is safe. While this film became a heartthrob film for a new generation of young girl moviegoers like "Lost Boys" was of previous generations it is also a notable film to modern day Generation X and Millennials who are hardcore vampire film buffs.
- "Dracula Untold" (2014). Directed by Gary Shore, and also starring Dominic Cooper, Sarah Gadon, Charles Dance, as well as Art Parkinson. The film is based on the character in Bram Stoker the novel.
- What We Do In the Shadows (2014). Originally a short film made in 2005, the feature film version is a mockumentary that follows a group of vampires, Viago, Vladislav, Deacon and Petyr, living together in Wellington, New Zealand. The film follows the daily lives of these flatmates on the run up to an event called the Unholy Masquerade, a masquerade ball where all of the cities undead (vampires, zombies and witches) come together once a year, and how they're shaken up after modern, reckless vampire Nick joins their flat. Directed by Jemaine Clement and Taika Waititi, this indie originally premiered at Sundance and over the years has gained a firm cult fanbase, getting two spinoffs including the show of the same name, What We Do In The Shadows.

== Games ==
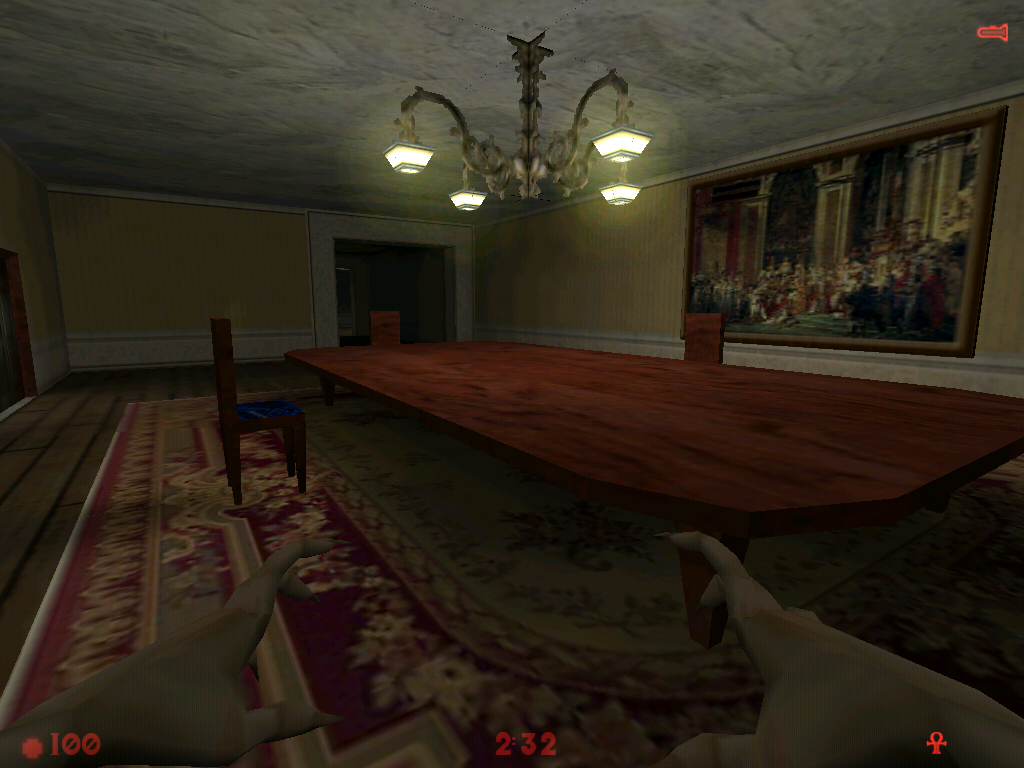
In many vampire-centered games, players may take on the role of vampires themselves.

As a well-known and iconic creature type, vampires are central to a variety of games, including board games, role-playing games, and video games.

These include a number of games where vampires are either incidental villains, or the primary villain of the game, as well as games that allow players to play as a vampire. It has been noted that vampires are "supernatural beings with a laundry list of fantastic abilities and a need for feeding on the living, which would presumably give numerous options for a plot". As late as 2014, however, it was lamented that there were not enough video games featuring vampires, with one commentary noting that "Vampires have never lent themselves readily to video games" due to their combination of cerebral and passionate characteristics, which "need something that most video games can't handle at the best of times, great writing".

=== Board games and card games ===
The Fury of Dracula is a board game for 2-4 players designed by Stephen Hand and published by Games Workshop in 1987. Fantasy Flight Games released an updated version in 2006 as Fury of Dracula, and a third edition in 2015 by the same name. WizKids Games released a fourth edition in 2019. In the April 1988 edition of Dragon (Issue 132), Jim Bambra liked the first edition of the game, saying, "[It] takes some of the best elements of role-playing games and neatly transposes them into an intriguing and fun board game." Bambra recommended the game, concluding, "Steeped in Gothic atmosphere and tinged with the unexpected, The Fury of Dracula game deserves to be in every gamer’s collection."

Vampire: The Eternal Struggle (published as Jyhad in the first or "Limited" edition and often abbreviated as V:TES) is a multiplayer collectible card game published by White Wolf Publishing, set in the World of Darkness. The game was designed in 1994 by Richard Garfield and initially published by Wizards of the Coast and was the third CCG ever created. As Garfield's first follow-up to his popular Magic: The Gathering collectible card game, he was eager to prove that the genre was "a form of game as potentially diverse as board games". In 1995 the game was renamed from Jyhad to Vampire: The Eternal Struggle to increase its appeal and distance itself from the Islamic term jihad.

=== Role-playing games ===
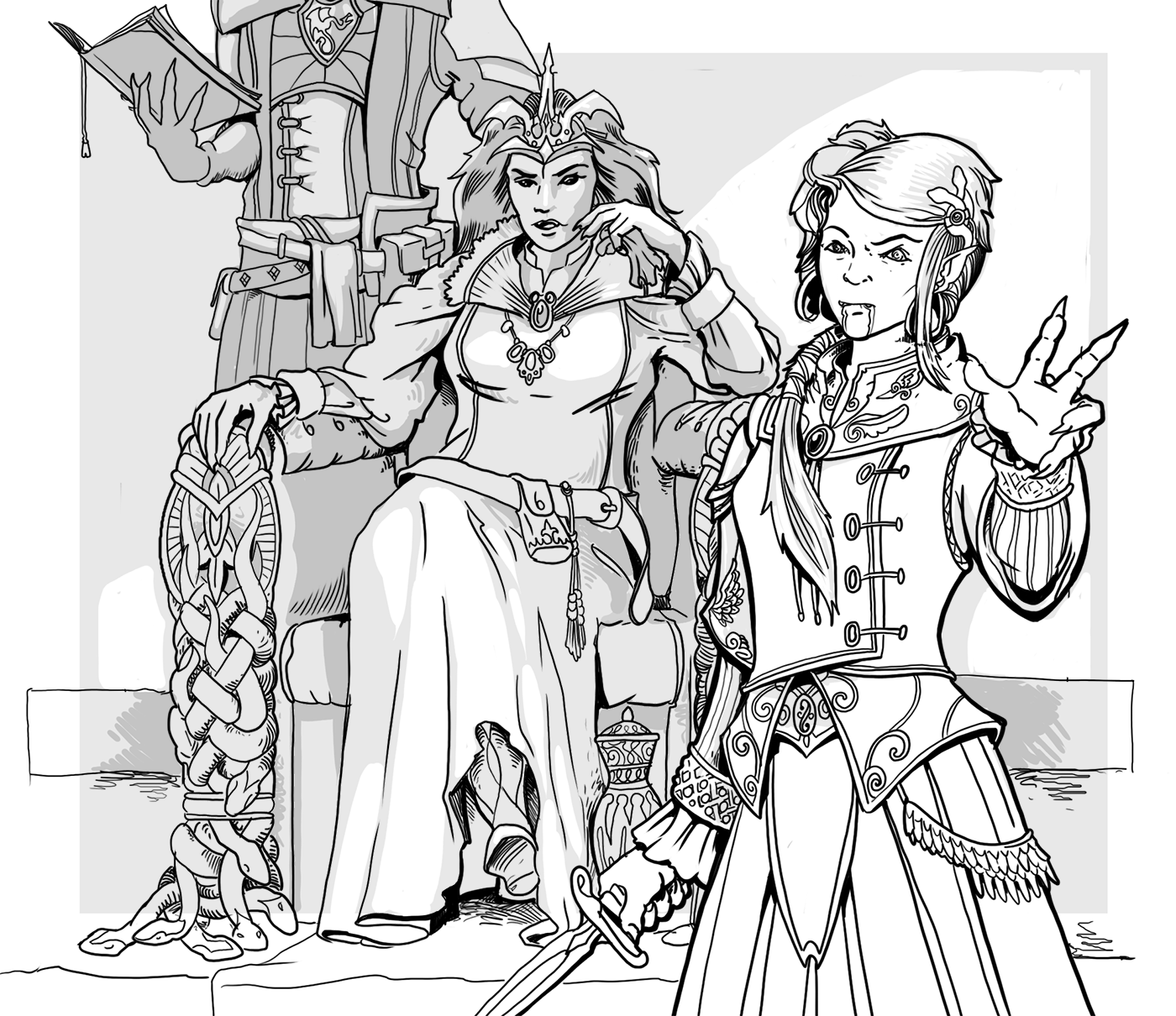
Vampires are generally presented as evil monsters in Dungeons & Dragons.

In the Dungeons & Dragons fantasy role-playing game, the vampire is an undead creature. A humanoid or monstrous humanoid creature can become a vampire, and looks as it did in life, with pale skin, haunting red eyes, and a feral cast to its features. A new vampire is created when another vampire drains the life out of a living creature. Its depiction is related to those in 1930s and 1940s Hollywood Dracula and monster movies. In writing vampires into the game, as with other creatures arising in folklore, the authors had to consider what elements arising in more recent popular culture should be incorporated into their description and characteristics.

The vampire was one of the first monsters introduced in the earliest edition of the game, in the Dungeons & Dragons "white box" set (1974), where they were described simply as powerful undead. They appeared again in the Greyhawk supplement. The vampire later appeared in the first edition Monster Manual (1977), where its description was changed somewhat to a chaotic evil, night-prowling creature whose powerful negative force drains life energy from victims.

One popular Dungeons & Dragons campaign setting, Ravenloft, has as a central character a vampire named Strahd Von Zarovich, who is both ruler and prisoner of his own personal domain of Barovia. How Count Von Zarovich became the darklord of Barovia was detailed in the novel, I, Strahd: The Memoirs of a Vampire.

==== Other role-playing games ====
The role-playing game Vampire: The Masquerade has been influential upon modern vampire fiction and elements of its terminology, such as embrace and sire, appear in contemporary fiction.

GURPS Cabal, a book that features a customizable campaign setting for the GURPS role-playing game system, depicts a modern-day secret society composed of vampires, lycanthropes and sorcerers who study the underlying principles of magic and visit other planes of existence and was integrated into Infinite Worlds, the "default" (core) setting for GURPS's 4th Edition. The Third Edition GURPS supplement Blood Types lists 47 different "species" of vampires describing 30 of them from both folklore and fiction in 23 listings (several are simply different names for the same type of vampire; for example the Burma's Kephn is considered a male version of the Penanggalen)

Shadowrun features vampires whose existence is explained by a resurgence of the Human Meta-Human Vampiric Virus. As such, the afflicted are not undead, but instead are still alive but radically changed by the retrovirus. They normally do not suffer from the supernatural limitations such as crosses, but still are vulnerable to sunlight. In the tabletop wargame Warhammer Fantasy, Vampire Counts are one of the playable forces.

=== Video games ===
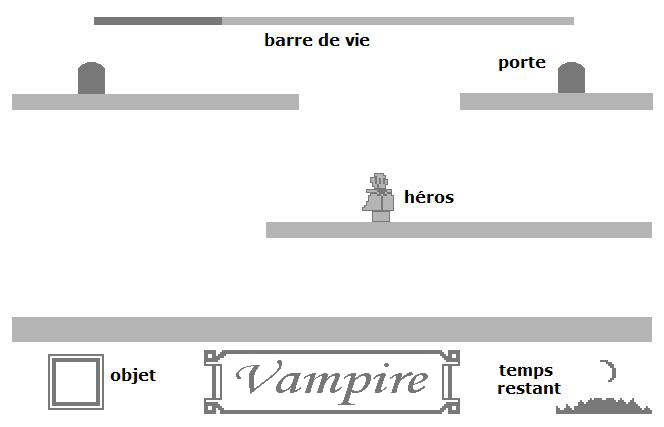
The 1986 French video game Vampire was one of the first video games to feature vampires, along with the similar 1986 Spanish game Vampire.

One of the earliest video games featuring a vampire as the antagonist is The Count, a 1979 text adventure for various platforms, in which local villagers send the player to defeat Count Dracula.

A number of video game developers "have taken inspiration from the vampire myth to create unique gaming experiences that have players hunting down the beasts as well as playing as a member of the undead". Popular video games about vampires include Castlevania, which is an extension of the original Bram Stoker novel Dracula, and Legacy of Kain.

A number of websites have compiled "best of" lists of vampire games, with games frequently mentioned including Castlevania: Symphony of the Night, Darkwatch, Infamous: Festival of Blood, Legacy of Kain: Soul Reaver, The Elder Scrolls V: Skyrim, and Vampire: The Masquerade – Bloodlines.

While most vampire-themed games involve some kind of combat between the player (either fighting vampires, or as a vampire fighting other foes), some games incorporate vampires without including those elements. In particular, The Sims 4 features the game pack, The Sims 4: Vampires, which includes Vampires as a life state, with Gothic-themed objects, outfits, interactions, aspirations, foods, and a Vampire Lore Skill. It is only available for digital download. The pack also features a new neighborhood called Forgotten Hollow which, fitting with the vampiric theme, has longer nighttimes than other neighborhoods. It takes elements from The Sims 2: Nightlife, The Sims 3: Late Night and The Sims 3: Supernatural.

== Manga ==
- Japanese anime and manga features vampires in several titles, including JoJo's Bizarre Adventure (1987), Vampire Princess Miyu (OAV 1988, TV series 1997), Nightwalker: The Midnight Detective (1998), Vampire Hunter D (2000), Blood: The Last Vampire (2000), Hellsing (2002), Vampire Host (2004), Tsukihime, Lunar Legend (2003), Tsukuyomi -Moon Phase- (2004), Bleach (2005), Blood+ (2005),Trinity Blood (2005),Vampire Knight,'(2005)'Karin (2006), Black Blood Brothers (2006), Shiki (2007), Rosario + Vampire (2004), Castlevania (2017), Dark Moon: The Blood Altar (2026).

== Music ==
=== Artists ===
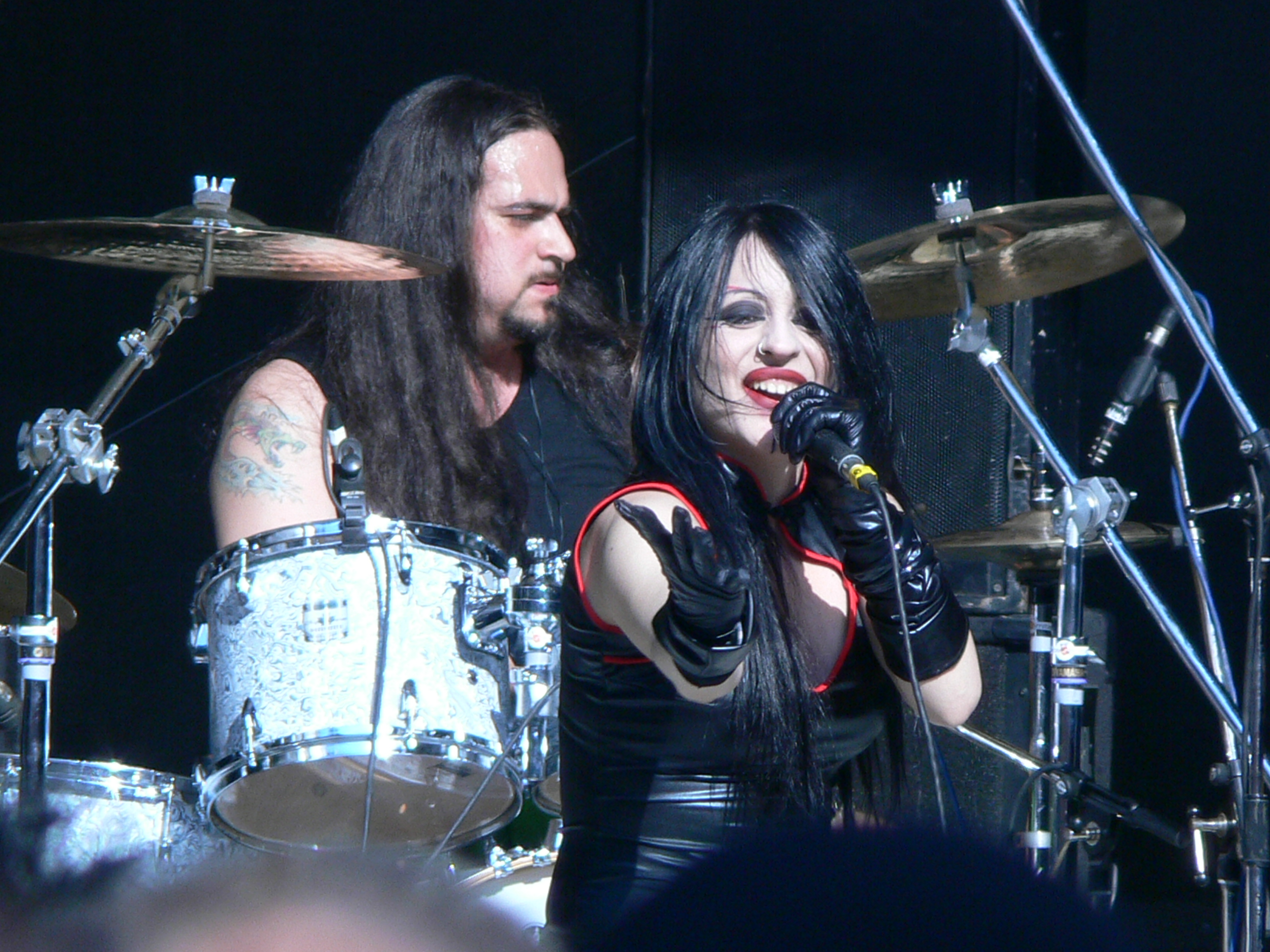
Theatres des Vampires is a gothic black metal band fully concentrating on vampire themes.

- Draconian is a doom metal band with issues facing vampires.
- The vocalist Kamijo of the Japanese Visual Kei band, Versailles, says his look is influenced by the appearance of a vampire.
- Theatres des Vampires is a gothic black metal band fully concentrating on vampire themes.
- Vampire Weekend deliberately chose their name to capitalise on the popularity of vampires in popular culture.
- Fearless Vampires Killers is an English alternative rock band, which received the name from the 1967 Roman Polanski film The Fearless Vampire Killers
- Czech gothic rock group XIII. Stoleti has recorded an album called "Nosferatu".

=== Songs ===
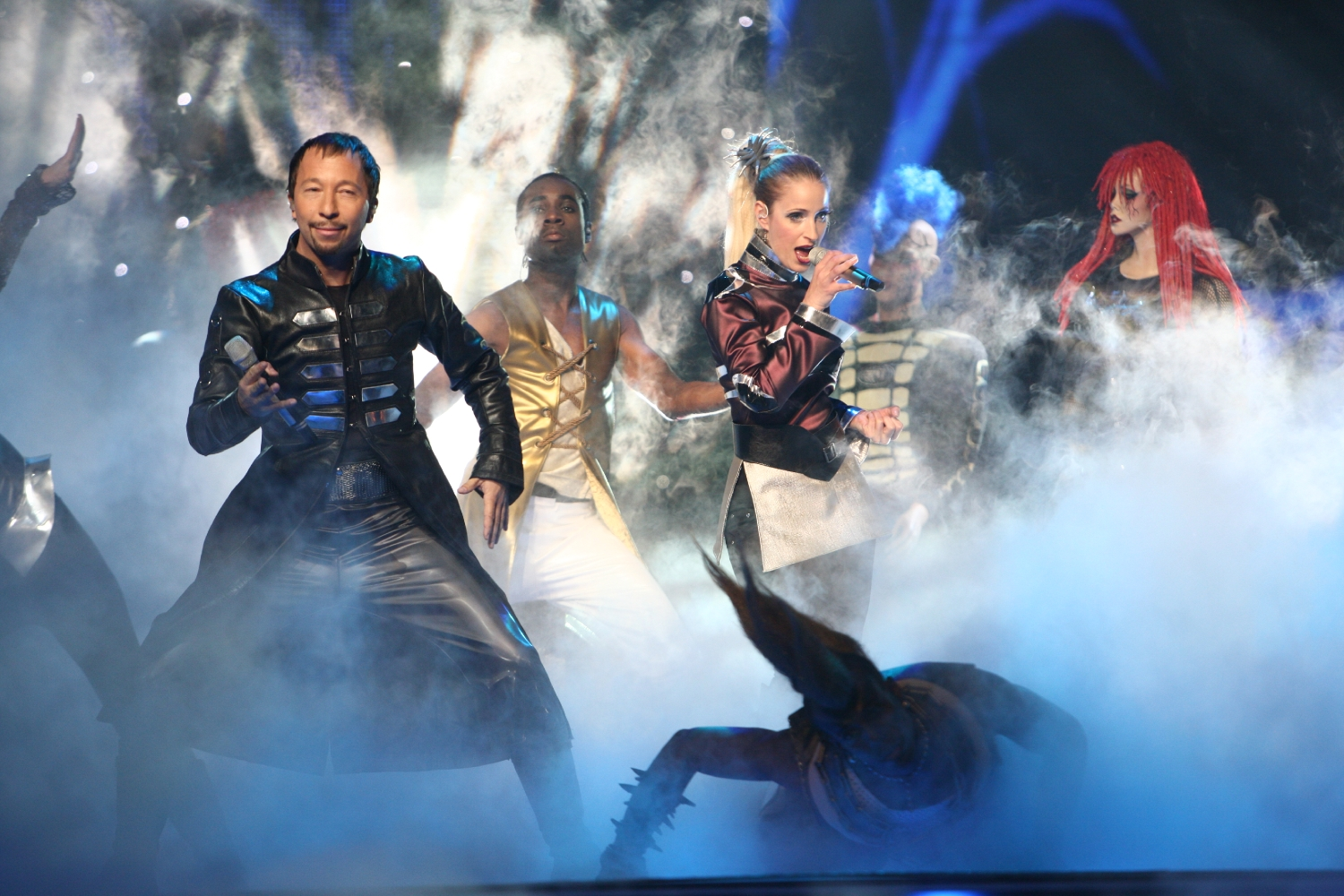
"Vampires Are Alive" was a Swiss entry for the Eurovision Song Contest 2007.

- Marilyn Manson has a song entitled "If I Was Your Vampire." It is the opening track on the band's sixth studio album, "Eat Me, Drink Me," which has several other songs that deal with vampiric themes. The band also has a song called "No Reflection" (from the album "Born Villain") in direct reference to the belief that vampires do not have reflections.
- Bonnie Tyler has a song entitled "Total Eclipse of the Heart" which was a huge hit and was originally written as a vampire love song.
- Alternative rock band HIM has a song called "Vampire Heart" on their Dark Light album.
- Concrete Blonde has a song titled "Bloodletting (The Vampire Song)" on their Bloodletting album.
- Darkthrone has a song and album entitled "Transilvanian Hunger".
- My Chemical Romance has a song titled "Vampires Will Never Hurt You" on their debut album, I Brought You My Bullets, You Brought Me Your Love.
- Ash has a song entitled "Vampire Love" on their album Meltdown.
- Nox Arcana recorded the album Transylvania based on Bram Stoker's Dracula.
- The folk band Antsy Pants has a song entitled "Vampire" on their debut album "Antsy Pants".
- Xandria plays a song called "Vampire".
- Blue Öyster Cult has a song titled "Nosferatu", and another called "I Love the Night", in which the narrator succumbs to a female vampire's seduction and becomes one himself. They are the last two tracks on the original release of the band's Spectres album.
- Cuban singer Lissette has a song title "Vampiro" on her 1989 album Maniqui.
- Fall Out Boy's "A Little Less Sixteen Candles, a Little More "Touch Me"" music video revolves around vampires.
- Falling in Reverse has a song entitled "I'm Not A Vampire" on their album "The Drug in Me Is You".
- Ice Nine Kills has a song named Bloodbath and Beyond on their album Every Trick In The Book. The song is about Dracula.
- The Orion Experience have a song titled "Vampire" on their Sugar Deluxe album.
- Vocaloid musician Deco*27 has a song titled "The Vampire" (ヴァンパイア) on his album MANNEQUIN. The music video depicts Hatsune Miku as a vampire.
- Pop Star Olivia Rodrigo has a song titled Vampire on her second studio album, Guts

== Paintings ==
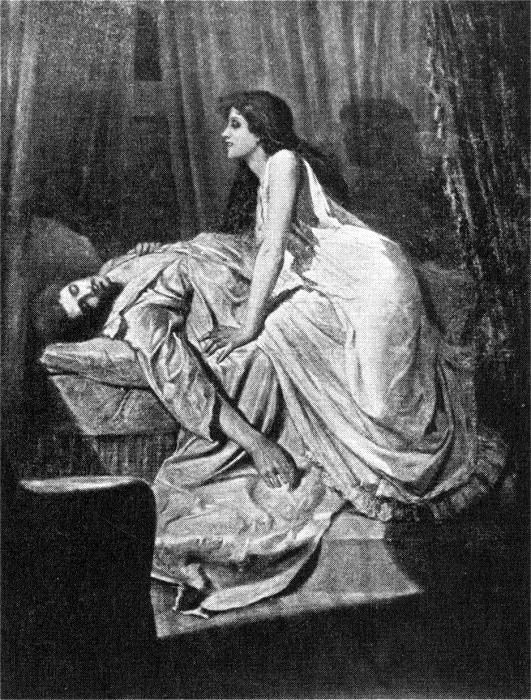
The Vampire, by Philip Burne-Jones.

"The Vampire" (1897) by Philip Burne-Jones depicts an alluring female vampire crouched over a male victim. The model was the famous actress Mrs Patrick Campbell. This femme fatale inspired a poem of the same name (also 1897) by Rudyard Kipling. Like much of Kipling's verse it was incredibly popular, and its inspired many early silent films whose "vampires" were actually "vamps" rather than being supernatural undead blood-suckers. The 1913 film The Vampire features the famous and controversial "Vampire Dance", which takes inspiration from the painting. The poem's refrain: A fool there was . . . , describing a seduced man, became the title of the popular film A Fool There Was (1915) which made Theda Bara a star, and the archetypal cinematic "vamp".

== Radio ==
There have been many interpretations of vampires over the years for mystery and horror radio anthology programs, including several adaptations of Sheridan Le Fanu's novella Carmilla and Bram Stoker's novel Dracula.

- Dracula, adapted from Bram Stoker's novel Dracula by John Houseman and Orson Welles for Mercury Theatre On the Air's first ever broadcast on July 11, 1938. The program received mostly praise from audiences and for the extensive sound work throughout the production.
- Carmilla, adapted from Sheridan Le Fanu's novella Carmilla for The Columbia Workshop's broadcast on July 28, 1940. This program's adaptation dove into the complexities of the lesbian vampire on the air as well as altering the ending from the original text.
- The Undead featured a plot of a wife suspecting that her husband is possibly a vampire for episode 250 of Inner Sanctum Mystery, broadcast on December 18, 1945. After investigation, the police confirm within the story that they have never come across any "authentic vampires."
- Sunset to Sunrise featured a mystery of a mother becoming a vampire after death for episode 81 of the 1974 Season of CBS Radio Mystery Theater, broadcast on April 25, 1974. The program also featured Dhampirs as an important part of the plot.
- Dracula was adapted from Bram Stoker's novel Dracula and retold for episode 85 of the 1974 Season of CBS Radio Mystery Theater, broadcast on May 2, 1974. Upon opening with Himan Brown's Inner Sanctum Mystery creaking door sound, host E. G. Marshall encouraged viewers to ponder on the word "Vampire" and belief in their existence, transitioning into the story.
- Carmilla, adapted from Sheridan Le Fanu's novella Carmilla for Sears Radio Theater broadcast in March 1979. Host Vincent Price opened the program by using a stanza from Lord Byron's The Giaour regarding vampires.

There were also a few Inner Sanctum Mystery broadcasts that feature "Vampire" within the title that are considered lost, but assumed to have featured a vampire based on their titles.

- "The Vampire Strikes", episode 4, was broadcast on January 28, 1941 for around 25 minutes.
- "Vampire", episode 366, was broadcast on April 12, 1948 for around 30 minutes.

It is possible that more of Inner Sanctum Mystery's lost episodes featured vampires, but that information is not available.

== Television ==
- Hellsing (2001–2002)" manga and TV series and the later anime remake "Hellsing Ultimate" (2006–2012): An anime series about a vampire named Alucard. He is the main protagonist in the Hellsing series and the most powerful weapon of the Hellsing Organization which works against vampires and other such supernatural forces. Alucard is no mere vampire; it has been implied that he is the most powerful vampire alive and may be the most powerful character in the series.
- Dark Shadows (1966–1971), a gothic horror-themed soap opera featuring vampire Barnabas Collins. This presentation carried over the traditional lore of vampires as creatures of the night who sleep in coffins, cast no reflection and wear black capes. However, the series was one of the first to humanize its vampire, depicting Barnabas Collins as a sympathetic, emotionally conflicted anti-hero.
- Star Trek (1966): In the original series episode titled "The Man Trap", there is a creature that lives on a remote planet that Captain Kirk and the away team encounter, which appears to be a female human but is otherwise a hideous chameleon-like creature that can take on human appearance. This creature makes its way aboard their starship, the Enterprise, and kills several crew members. The creature is a pseudo-vampire, as it looks nothing like a vampire but draws others' life force from them by sucking all the salt from their bodies.
- Kolchak: The Night Stalker (1972–1975): This was a television series in which Kolchak discovers an overlooked victim from a crime scene, now turned vampire, has made her way from Las Vegas to Los Angeles in episode #4, titled "The Vampire" (1974) which is a sequel of the first of the two TV movies, the series being inspired by "The Night Stalker" movie which also had vampires (a TV movie made in 1972). See List of Kolchak: The Night Stalker episodes. There was a very short-lived remake of this series simply called "Night Stalker" (2005).
- The Curse Of Dracula (1979): Count Dracula is alive and well and teaching college in 1979. The series lasted one season and featured flashback memories of Count Dracula, using sepia-tone to show scenes in a different era of time.
- Dracula: The Series (1990): This show was a Saturday morning feature with Van Helsing's descendants and vampires.
- Forever Knight (1992–1996): A Canadian TV series featuring a vampire known as Det. Nicholas 'Nick' Knight, who works at night and is a detective on the police force. In some episodes of this series, Nick's eyes would change to a silver-white color.
- Outer Limits: The New Series (1995): In an episode called "Caught In the Act", a small-town girl encounters a mysterious object that crashes through her ceiling into her bedroom. She is then turned into a lustful girl with a vampiric-type entity inhabiting her which demands sex from everyone she meets, and in the process, then absorbs their energy from them until they die. Will it be any different with her boyfriend, with which they were both previously waiting to have sex until marriage?
- Kindred: The Embraced (1996): This series features a conclave of vampires highly organized like a mob.
- Buffy the Vampire Slayer (1997): Inspired by the movie of the same title. The vampires in this series are presented as strong but fundamentally 'fragile' walking corpses, vulnerable to sunlight, decapitation, and stakes through the heart, and are clearly established as being demons possessing human corpses rather than humans corrupted by their vampire instincts. The vampire Angel is an exception to this rule, as he was cursed with his soul over a century ago, restoring his capacity for compassion and grief, driving him to seek redemption for his sins in the spin-off series Angel.
- Earth: Final Conflict (1997–2002): In the fifth and final season of this series, there is an episode, in a departure from the current storyline, that replaces the Taelons with the newly born and more aggressive alien race of energy vampires called the Atavus.
- Angel (1999): A spinoff of Buffy the Vampire Slayer. Unlike most vampires in the Whedonverse, Angel was cursed with a soul. If he was ever to experience a moment of perfect happiness, he would lose the soul and become Angelus, the ruthless and bloodthirsty vampire that he was in the past. Angel seeks redemption for his crimes by helping others who have supernatural problems.
- Buzz Lightyear of Star Command (2000–2001): Several episodes feature a robotic energy vampire named NOS-4-A2, created by Emperor Zurg, who controls machines that he bites.
- Blood Ties (2006–2008): Based on the "Blood Books" by Tanya Huff. This series was a supernatural drama that revolved around Vicki Nelson, a former homicide cop now a private investigator, and Henry Fitzroy, a 470-year-old vampire. Together they form a team which solves cases and deals with the supernatural world.
- Moonlight (2007–2008): In this TV series, the vampire Mick St. John has a love interest who is a mortal woman.
- Blade: The Series (2008): Inspired by the Blade saga of films (minus Wesley Snipes in the lead role). Like the movie, Blade is only half-vampire so he can effortlessly walk in the daylight to slay vampires. He is called a "daywalker", since sunlight doesn't bother him in the least.
- Being Human (2008–2013): A British television series about a vampire, a werewolf, and a ghost sharing a flat in Bristol. While a lot of vampires give into their nature, drinking blood and killing people without remorse, other vampires in the series feel guilty. These vampires try to give up their blood drinking addiction; however, their true nature usually comes through at some point.
- True Blood (2008–2014): A cable TV series about vampires as well as a host of other supernatural beings. This series continues the folklore that vampires cannot walk in the daylight.
- The Vampire Diaries (2009–2017): The TV series plot eventually has two brothers biding over the hand of a mortal girl who looks just like a vampire girl they knew generations ago. The vampires have 'daylight rings' made by witches that allow them to walk in the daylight.
- In the popular (2010) cartoon TV show Adventure Time, one of the main recurring characters is Marceline the Vampire Queen.
- Being Human (2011–2014): An American remake series of the British TV series of the same name. The show included vampires, werewolves, disembodied spirits, and witches.
- The Originals (2013–2018): A spinoff of "The Vampire Diaries" TV series, dealing with a family of vampires, a brooding faction between witches of the court of New Orleans and the vampires, as well as some shapeshifter wolves.
- Dracula (2013–2014): The mysticism of Count Dracula as a wealthy and seductive force to be reckoned with is further embellished in this drama, telling the story of his character and genius as both an entrepreneur and an inventor, a Tesla of his times. Also, this drama's sub-theme deals with his obsession to permanently walk in sunlight, while seeking a romantic liaison with Mina Murray, who appears to be a doppelganger or reincarnation of his past lover. He carries out his business transactions while hiding from a secret society cult that has sought to destroy all vampires for centuries.
- From Dusk till Dawn (2014): A series inspired by the movie of the same name.
- Grimm season 3, episode 14 titled “Mommy Dearest” (2014): This show centres around Nick Burkhardt, an American police officer who can see people who have an alternative animal side, which can in some cases be evil. This episode uses a figure taken from Filipino folklore, the Aswang, a creature (someone with an evil side let loose) something like a cross between a vampire and a werewolf, a humanoid shape-shifter that feeds on unborn infants of pregnant women.
- American Horror Story: Hotel (2015–2016), the fifth season of the FX anthology series American Horror Story: The season focuses on the fictional Hotel Cortez and its inhabitants, vampire-like creatures that are immortal, feed on blood, and are adverse to sunlight. Countess Elizabeth Johnson is the owner of the titular hotel. Her brood of children is infected with the blood virus, as is her lover Donovan and arch-nemesis Ramona Royale. Throughout the season, references to pop culture vampires, such as Count Orlok, are frequently made.
- Vampirina (2017): A Disney Junior original series about Vampirina "Vee" Hauntley moving from Transylvania to Pennsylvania with her family, all of whom are benevolent vampires.
- What We Do In The Shadows (2019–2024): A spinoff of the 2014 film of the same name, a mockumentary comedy TV show that revolves around three vampires that reside together in Staten Island.
- Interview with the Vampire (2022–present): An adaption of Anne Rice's Vampire Chronicles books, with alterations to some plotlines to explore social context of the past, and relationships between characters in different ways.

== Theatre ==
- First performed at the Limbo Lounge in New York City's East Village in 1984, the play Vampire Lesbians of Sodom became so popular it was moved Off-Broadway in June 1985. It ran five years at the Provincetown Playhouse.
- Dance of the Vampires (1997) is a musical from Jim Steinman.
- Lestat is a musical from Elton John, based on the novels by Anne Rice
- Der Vampyr is an opera, based on the short story The Vampyre (1819) by John Polidori.

== Other vampire references ==
Many regional vampire myths, or other creatures similar to or related to vampires have appeared in popular culture.

=== Darkseekers ===
- In the film I Am Legend, a mutated virus turns some humans and dogs into vampiric beings, called "Darkseekers", that prey on unmutated humans and dogs.

=== Moroi ===
- In the movie Bram Stoker's Dracula (1992), Count Dracula calls his wolf pet by the names strigoi and moroi.
- Mike Mignola's Right Hand of Doom, from the Hellboy series, features a female vampire proclaiming that the vârcolac (singular entity here) is the master of the moroii and strigoi.
- Richelle Mead's Vampire Academy series features Moroi as the protagonists and Strigoi as the antagonists.

=== Penanggalan ===
==== Film ====
- Penanggalan aka The Headless Terror, a 1967 film by Tulsi Ramsay, widely dismissed as a hoax
- The Witch with Flying Head (Fei taugh mo neuih, literally "Flying Head Devil Woman"), 1977 film by Lian Sing Woo (Though from Hong Kong, bootlegs are usually of the Thai-dubbed version, which also is rescored with Basil Poledouris music from Conan the Barbarian, which debuted several years after this film's first release. Principal photography had to have begun before April 1970, due to the presence of Peter Chen Ho, who died April 16, 1970.)
- Mystics in Bali, (Leák), 1983 film by H. Tjut Djalil., from the novel by Putra Mada
- Krasue, 2002 film by Bin Bunluerit
- Gong Tau; both Penanggalan and Mystics in Bali feature actor W. D. Mochtar as the priest who fights the Penanggalan. Both The Witch with Flying Head and Mystics in Bali depict an innocent transformed into a penanggalan against her will. In the former film, there is an effort to save her, and her attempt at suicide upon learning her condition is thwarted. In the latter film, she is considered irredeemable, and her neck is spiked to destroy her. Both characters are monstrous only at night and unaware of their nocturnal behavior until informed.

==== Print media ====
- The Dragon Warriors pen and paper RPG features a monster called the Death's Head, with a similar modus operandi to the Penanggalan, although the detached head has tiny wings and a horn.
- The penanggalan may be found described as a Dungeons & Dragons monster in the Fiend Folio (TSR, Inc., 1981). The vargouille is similar to the penanggalan in that both are vampire-like creatures in the form of a flying, detached head.
- A more recent Dungeons & Dragons penanggalan appears in the Oriental Adventures setting. Even more recent Dungeons & Dragons penanggalan appears in the Monster Vault: Threats to the Nentir Vale supplement.
- The penanggalan may be found described as an example of a vampire as well as the Kephn (a male counterpart from Burma) in the GURPS third edition supplement GURPS Blood Types (Steve Jackson Games, 1995)
- The short Guro fetish/comedy manga story "Head Prolapse Elegy" by Shintaro Kago revolves around the travails of a penanggalan who desires a normal love life with a man but is constantly thwarted by her condition.
- Wizard Entertainment)'s Hellboy Premier Edition features a story by Mike Mignola, "The Penanggalan" (later collected in the Premier Edition Volume 1 and Hellboy: The Troll Witch and Others), wherein Hellboy battles a penanggalan.
- The first book of the Malay Mysteries, Garlands of Moonlight, revolves around a penanggalan.
- The Eastern-inspired RPG Legend of the Five Rings features penanggalans, although there they are named penaggolans.
- A penanggalan appears in Christopher Golden & Nancy Holder's 1999 book Out Of The Madhouse, Volume 1 of The Gatekeeper Trilogy.

=== Shtriga ===
- The TV series Supernatural features a shtriga in the season 1 episode "Something Wicked". In a homage to The Simpsons, the shtriga in 'Supernatural' was said to have moved through Brockway, Ogdenville, and North Haverbrook, the same towns taken in by the monorail conman in the episode Marge vs. the Monorail.
- Shtrigas also appear in Andrzej Sapkowski's The Witcher short stories and saga.

=== Strigoi ===
==== Books ====
- In the 10th book of the Spook's series by Joseph Delaney, the main character master is placed under the control of a "Strigoi" and "Strigoica".
- Strigoi play a major role in James Rollins and Rebecca Cantrell's series, The Order of the Sanguines: City of Screams (2012), The Blood Gospel (2013), Innocent Blood (2013), Blood Brothers (2013), and Blood Infernal (2015).
- The term is used to describe vampires in general in the book series The Hunt by Susan Sizemore.
- The Strigoi play a central role in Graham Masterton's 2006 book, The Descendant.
- Richelle Mead's Vampire Academy novels features Strigoi as villains.
- The Strigoi play a central role in Dan Simmon's 1992 book, Children of the Night.
- A Strigoi appears in "Philologos; or, A Murder in Bistrita" by Debra Doyle and James D. Macdonald in the February 2008 Fantasy and Science Fiction
- In the Guardians of Ga' Hoole book series, an evil owl whose ancestors were witch owls called hagsfiends renames herself the Striga after her escape from the Qui' Dragon Palace.
- Guillermo del Toro's 2009 book The Strain references vampires as strigoi.
- Strigoi is the preferred name of vampires in Susan Krinard's Roaring Twenties series.
- Mike Mignola's Right Hand of Doom from the Hellboy comic series features a female vampire proclaiming that the vârcolac (singular entity here) is the master of the moroii and strigoi.
- In The Silmarillion by J.R.R Tolkien, vampires are mentioned. However, only one, Thuringwethil, is described. She is the messenger of the evil Vala Morgoth, and is a bat-like creature. During The Tale of Beren and Lúthien, another servant of Morgoth, Sauron, takes the form of a vampire.
- In Yankel Krümmel's Matrice Granit, the story of Gregorius the Strigoi is told.
- Terry Pratchett wrote a novel, Carpe Jugulum, that revolves around a feud between vampires and witches. The novel is also a tongue-in-cheek reversal of popularized traditional vampire myths.

==== Games ====
- In the 2008 adventure video game A Vampyre Story, one of the more prominent characters is named Madam Strigoi and, although she is not herself a vampyre (as far as is known), she has great insight into vampires.
- The video game Ace Combat 6 features an elite enemy fighter squadron called "Strigon Team" formally known as the "Vampire Team", whose insignia and paint scheme contains death motifs and whose commander flies an experimental aircraft named "Nosferatu".
- The Underground adventure game Ben Jordan: Case 3 features a Strigoi who goes by the name of Zortherus.
- In the Disgaea video game series, there is a class of vampires called Strigoi.
- In the 2008 video game Soul Calibur 4, the French fencer (and vampire) Raphael Sorel has a move called the Strigoi Envelopment.
- The 2007 video game The Witcher, based on the novels by Andrzej Sapkowski, features a vampiric female creature known as a striga.
- The Sixth Edition of the Warhammer Fantasy Battle game gives the name Strigoi to a bloodline of monstrous vampires, similar to Count Orlok.
- In Dragon's Dogma: Dark Arisen, Strigoi are encountered as enemies after the defeat of the main boss. They look like large, blood-red gargoyles and attack by draining blood from the Arisen and their pawns using their tail.
- One of the playable heroes in Defense of the Ancients, Strygwygr the Bloodseeker, is based on Poltergeist, a variant of vampire.
- Darkstalkers heavily features vampires, such as Demitri Maximoff (a classic Dracula-type of vampire) and Hsein-Ko who is a Jiang-shi (a type of Chinese vampire), and other monsters.
- The protagonist of the 2018 action-RPG Vampyr is a vampire, as well as featuring various underground vampire communities.

==== Movies ====
- One of the villains in the 30 Days of Night (2007) film is listed as "Strigoi" in the end credits.
- In the film Bloodstone: Subspecies II (1993), some of the characters refer to vampires as "strigoi".
- In the Dracula 2000 movie, Count Dracula calls his wolf pet by the names of "strigoi" and "moroi".
- The 2009 film Strigoi involves vampires in Romania, which are referred to as "strigoi".
- The segment Terror from the 2021 film V/H/S/94 involves one character based on the "strigoi".

==== Music ====
- The term is used in a song from the black metal band Dark Funeral called "Ravenna Strigoi Mortii" on the album Vobiscum Satanas.
- Italian musician Lord Vampyr, famous for being the former vocalist of the gothic metal band Theatres des Vampires, has a song named "Strigoi" on his second solo studio album, Carpathian Tragedies (2009).
- German power metal band Powerwolf has a song called "Armata Strigoi" on the album Blessed & Possessed (2015).

==== Television ====
- A group of strigoi appeared in the episode "Bite Father, Bite Son" in the animated series American Dragon: Jake Long.
- Strigoi are the featured enemy in the 1999 episode "Darkness Visible" of the show Hercules: The Legendary Journeys.
- The strigoi was featured in the Animal Planet TV series Lost Tapes.
- In the ABC television series Scariest Places on Earth, strigoi are discussed in an episode called "Return to Romania Dare." The episode originally aired on April 21, 2002.
- The vampires in the 2014 television series The Strain are referred to as strigoi by the character Abraham.
- In "Earth Final Conflict" (1997–2002), energy vampires as such are called the Atavus. They are not the traditional style vampires of folklore.
- In the TV series "Vampire Diaries" and "The Originals" the vampires have what are called 'daylight rings' made by witches allowing them to walk in daylight. There is even one ring made that allows the user any mortal to bet death if killed. (Even the werewolves in "The Originals" series were seeking to get 'moonlight rings' to keep them all from turning into wolves when they do not want to).

=== Strix ===
The Stirge was presented as a popular monster in Dungeons & Dragons. In the game, it took the form of a many-legged flying creature which sucked the blood from its victims through a sharp, tubular beak.

A version of the striga makes an appearance in The Witcher video game based on the works of Polish writer Andrzej Sapkowski. As a demonic undead creature, which transforms from the corpse of a dead child conceived via incest, striga in the Witcher's universe does not look like insects or vampires but looks similar to a ghoul with a muscular quadrupedal body, big claws, and a fang-filled mouth.

The strix make an appearance in the Vampire: The Requiem historical book Requiem for Rome. In contrast to the more traditional vampires presented in the line, the strix are disembodied spirits who commonly take the shape of owls and can possess both humans and torpored vampires. It is rumored that the strix restored Remus to undeath, and corrupted a sixth clan of vampires who were destroyed en masse. The strix believed themselves to be betrayed by the vampires of Rome, especially those of the Julii clan, and swore to bring about their ruin. They reappear in Night Horrors: Wicked Dead as heralds of disaster, mainly unbound by their former oath (although they still occasionally pursue such activities for personal reasons). Immensely amoral libertines, they view vampires clinging to humanity as weak, and as such will often serve as tempters in order to make them lose themselves to the Beast.

Strix are also described in the GURPS third edition Sourcebook for Vampires Blood Types. They are described as witches who, having made pacts with dark entities, gained the ability to become blood-drinking birds at night. What their pacts with these dark forces require of them is not described.

=== Vourdalak (or wurdalak) ===
==== Books ====
- Aleksey Konstantinovich Tolstoy's 1839 novella The Family of the Vourdalak tells the story of a french diplomat seeking refuge with a Serbian family, the patriarch of which has turned into a vourdalak

==== Movies ====
- Mario Bava's 1963 anthology film Black Sabbath includes one segment about the "wurdulak" based on Tolstoy's story and starring Boris Karloff.
- The 1972 Italian/Spanish film, La Notte dei Diavoli (Night of the Devils) is also based on Tolstoy's story.
- The character of Stefan (portrayed by Adam Croasdell) in the 2012 film Werewolf: The Beast Among Us was a "wurdalak".
- In the 2023 French horror film, The Vourdalak, based on Tolstoy's novella The Family of the Vourdalak, the character Gorcha is a vourdalak.

== See also ==
- List of fictional vampires
