= Strix (mythology) =

Folkloric bird of antiquity

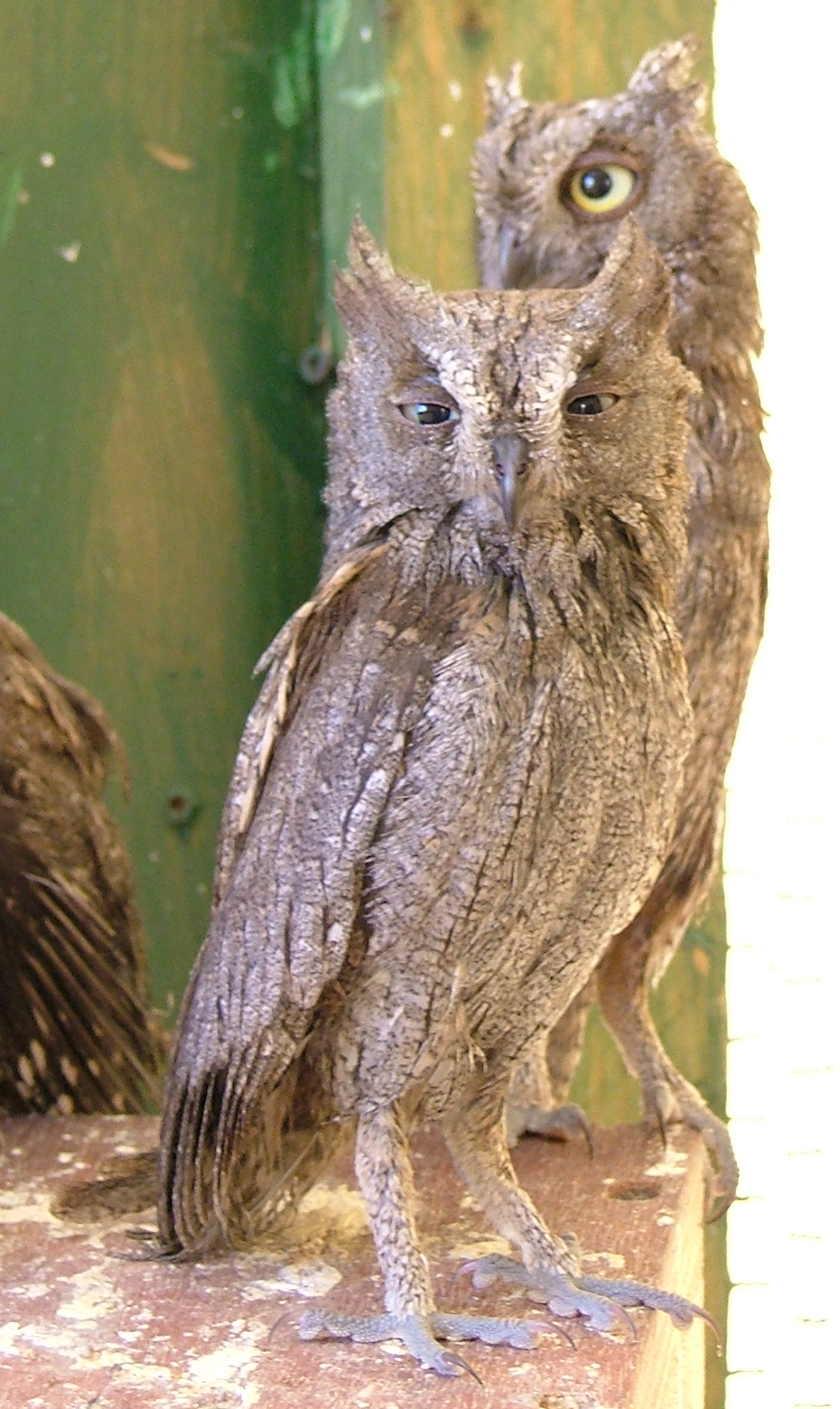
The appearance and calls of owls, such as the Eurasian scops owl, may have influenced Greek ideas of the blood-drinking strix.

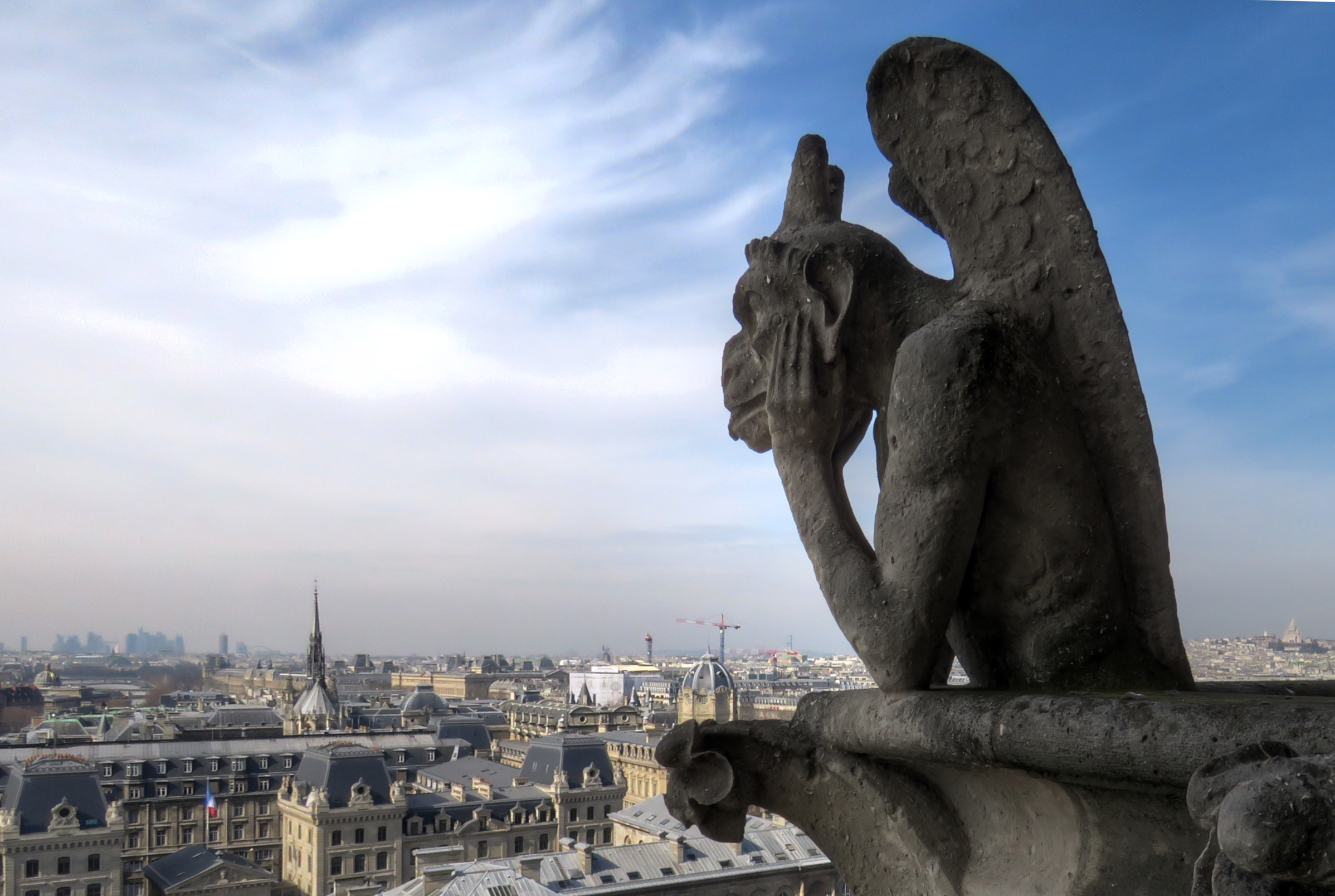
"Le Stryge" Chimera overlooks Paris from atop Notre-Dame de Paris.

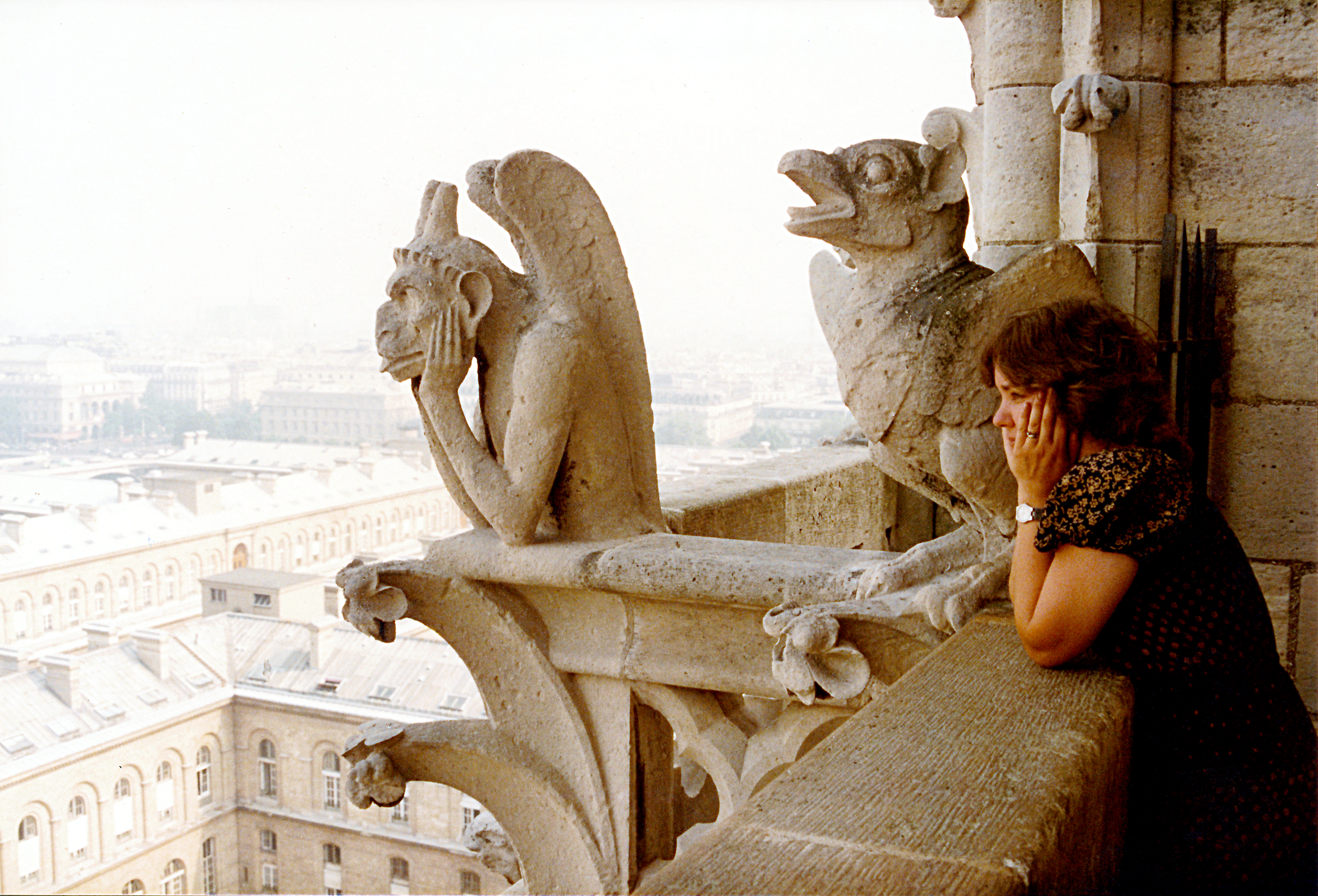
The striges of Notre-Dame.

The strix (plural striges or strixes), in the mythology of classical antiquity, was a bird of ill omen, the product of metamorphosis, that fed on human flesh and blood. It also referred to witches and related malevolent folkloric beings.

== Description ==
=== Physical appearance ===
The strix is described as a large-headed bird with transfixed eyes, rapacious beak, greyish white wings, (Note: Latin: canities) and hooked claws in Ovid's Fasti. This is the only thorough description of the strix in Classical literature. Elsewhere, it is described as being dark-colored. (Note: The Latin atra (ater) is rather vague, and may not be indicative of color. Oliphant (1913), p. 136.)

=== Behavior ===
The strīx (στρίξ, στριγός) (Note: Greek strīx (στρίξ or ϛρίγξ), emended from styx (ϛύξ / στύξ).) was a nocturnally crying creature which positioned its feet upwards and head below, according to a pre-300 BC Greek origin myth. (Note: The myth is Boios's Ornithologia, preserved by Antoninus Liberalis, described below.) It is probably meant to be (and translated as) an owl, but is highly suggestive of a bat which hangs upside-down.

The strix in later folklore was a bird which squirted milk upon the lips of (human) infants. Pliny in his Natural History dismissed this as nonsense (Note: Since the bat was the only winged animal with mammary glands.) (Note: In the ancient world the bat was commonly classified as a bird; only Aristotle differed, considering it halfway between bird and land animal. See Oliphant (1913), p. 134 n. 4.) and remarked it was impossible to establish what bird was meant by this. (Note: Their name was once used as a curse being the only other piece of information Pliny gives here.) The same habit, in which the strix lactates foul-smelling milk onto an infant's lips is mentioned by Titinius, who noted the placement of garlic on the infant was the prescribed amulet to ward against it.

In the case of Ovid's striges, they threatened to do more harm than that. They were said to disembowel an infant and feed on its blood. Ovid allows the possibilities of the striges being birds of nature, or products of magic, or transformations by witches using magical incantations.

== History ==
=== Greek origin myth ===
According to Antoninus Liberalis's Metamorphoses, the strīx (στρίξ) was a metamorphosis of Polyphonte; she and her bear-like sons Agrios and Oreios were transformed into birds as punishment for their cannibalism. Here the strix is described as (a bird) "that cries by night, without food or drink, with head below and tips of feet above, a harbinger of war and civil strife to men". (Note: Latin translation: "Polyphonte in Stygem [sic.] mutata est, avem noctu canentem, cibi potusque exsortem, caput deorsum, pedes imos habentem, belli et seditionis hominibus nuciam")

The tale only survives in the form as recorded by Antonius who flourished 100–300 AD, but it preserved an older tale from the lost Ornithologia by Boios, dated to before the end of 4th century BC.

In this Greek myth, the ill-omened strīx herself did not perpetrate harm on humans. But one paper suggests guilt by association with her sons, and seeks to reconstruct an ancient Greek belief in the man-eating strīx dating back to this age (4th century BC). In an opposing view, one study failed to find the ancient Greeks subscribing to the strīx as a "terror" to mankind, but noted a widespread belief in Italy that it was a "bloodthirsty monster in bird form." This study surmises that the Greeks later borrowed the concept of strix as witches, a concept articulated in Ovid, and one scholar estimates the Greeks adopted the strix as "child-murdering horrors" by the "last centuries BC". The modern Greek form στρίγλα may betray an influence of a Latin diminutive strigula.

=== Early passing reference in Latin ===
The first Latin allusion is in Plautus' comedy Pseudolus dated to 191 BC, in which an inferior cook's cuisine is metaphorized as the striges ("vampyre owls") devouring the diners' gastrointestinal organs while still alive, and shortening their lifespan. Commentators point to this as attestation that the striges were regarded as man-eating (anthropophagism). (Note: Although this is an example of figurative use.)

=== Ovid's account of striges attack ===
In Ovid's Fasti (8 AD), the striges targeted legendary king Procas in his cradle. (Note: Procas was a legendary king of Latium before the Roman Empire.) The assault was detected and interrupted but left the infant with scars on his cheeks and discoloration of his complexion. A ritual to keep the striges away from the newborn prince was subsequently performed by the nymph Cranae (or goddess Carna), who owned a wand of whitethorn (spina), given to her by Janus, which could expel evil from all doors. (Note: The ritual involved stroking the lintel and threshold with an arbutus branch, and placating the evil with chopped entrails of pigs, etc. This constitutes an explanation for the custom of eating beans and bacon on the Kalends of June as votive offerings to Carna.)

=== Satyricon ===
Petronius's novel Satyricon (late 1st century AD) includes a tale told by the character Trimalchio, describing the striges that snatched away the body of a boy who had already died, substituting a straw doll. The striges made their presence known by their scream, and a manservant attending to the intrusion discovered a woman and ran her through with a sword so that she groaned, but his whole body turned livid and would die a few days later. (Note: The same work also notes the striges would feed on the marrow or sinews (nervus) of the living.)

=== Magical associations ===
Pliny's comment that "[strix]...employed in maledictions" signified that its name invoked in "potent" magic curses according to one interpretation, but it may have only been used as curse-word, reflecting its regard as an accursed creature.

There are several examples of the strix's plumage, etc., said to be used as an ingredient in magic. Horace in his Epodes, wrote that the strix's feathers are an ingredient in a love potion, as has his contemporary Propertius. Medea's rejuvenating concoction which she boiled in a cauldron used a long list of ingredients, including the strix's wings.

The striges also came to mean "witches". One paper speculates that this meaning is as old as the 4th century BC, on the basis that in the origin myth of Boios, various names (Note: Strymon, Thraissa and Triballos) can be connected to the Macedonia-Thrace region well known for witches. But more concrete examples occur in Ovid's Fasti (early 1st century AD) where the striges as transformations of hags is offered as one possible explanation, and Sextus Pompeius Festus (fl. late 2nd century) glossed as "women who practice witchcraft" "(maleficis mulieribus)" or "flying women" ("witches" by transference)

=== Underworld ===
Striges, vultures, and bubo owls cry in the marshes in Hades, by the edge of Tartarus (Note: The spot is by Cocytus, one of two rivers forming the moat of the residence of Dis, and the source of these rivers are the Tartaus.) according to Seneca the Younger's tragedy Hercules Furens. Also, according to the legend of Otus and Ephialtes, they were punished in Hades by being tied to a pillar with snakes, with a strix perched on that column. (Note: Hyginus spells the bird styx, as in Antonius Libellus above.)

=== Medieval Period ===
The legend of the strix survived into the Middle Ages, as recorded in Isidore's Etymologiae. In the 7th–8th century John of Damascus equated the stiriges (Greek plural: Greek: στρίγγαι, Στρῦγγαι) with the gelloudes (pl. of gello) in his entry Perī Stryggōn Greek: περί Στρυγγῶν). He wrote that they sometimes had corporeal bodies and wore clothing, and sometimes appeared as spirits.

== Modern derived terms ==
The Latin term striga in both name and sense as defined by Medieval lexicographers was in use throughout central and eastern Europe.

Strega (obviously derived from Latin striga) is the Italian term for "witch". This word itself gave a term sometimes also used in English, stregheria, a form of witchcraft. In Romanian, strigăt means "scream". Strigăt is also the Romanian name of the barn owl and of the death's-head hawkmoth.

=== Spirits ===
Strigoaică is the name of the Romanian feminine vampire, and strigoi is the Romanian male vampire. Both can scream loudly, especially when they become poltergeists—a trait they have in common with the banshees. Albanian folklore tells of the shtriga, Slavic of the strzyga/stryha, and Jewish of Estries.

Linnaeus named the biological genus of earless owls Strix; historically, this genus was (erroneously) thought to extend to barn owls.

== See also ==
- Abyzou
- Gello
- Lamashtu
- Lamia
- Lilith
- Strigoi
- Shtriga
- Strzyga
- Estries
- Vampires in popular culture#Strix
