= Strigoi =

Vampires or troubled spirits from Romanian folklore

Strigoi in Romanian mythology are troubled spirits that are said to have risen from the grave. They are attributed with the abilities to transform into a beast, become invisible, and to gain vitality from the blood of their victims. Bram Stoker's Dracula may be a modern interpretation of the Strigoi through their historic links with vampirism.

== Etymology ==
Strigòi is a Romanian word that originated from a root related to the Latin terms strix or striga with the addition of the augmentative suffix -oi (feminine -oaică). Otila Hedeşan notes that the same augmentative suffix appears in the related terms moroi and bosorcoi (borrowed from Hungarian boszorka) and considers this parallel derivation to indicate membership in the same "mythological micro-system." The -oi suffix notably converts feminine terms to the masculine gender as well as often investing it with a complex mixture of augmentation and pejoration. The root has been related particularly to owls. Cognates are found throughout the Romance languages, such as the Italian words strega or the Venetian word strìga which mean "witch". The Italian stregone even has the parallel cognate augmentative suffix and means "sorcerer." In French, stryge means a bird-woman who sucks the blood of children. Jules Verne used the term "stryges" in Chapter II of his novel The Carpathian Castle, published in 1892. The Greek word strix, Polish strzyga, Hungarian sztriga, and the Albanian word shtriga are also cognate.

In the late Roman period the word became associated with witches or a type of ill-omened nocturnal flying creature. A strix (Late Latin striga, Greek στρίγξ), referred to night-time entities that craved human flesh and blood, particularly infants'.

It is related to the Romanian verb a striga, which means "to scream".

== Historiography ==
=== Early reports ===
One of the earliest mentions of a historical strigoi is the story of Jure Grando Alilović (1579–1656) from the region of Istria. The villager is believed to have been the first real person described as a vampire because he was referred to as a strigoi, štrigon or štrigun in contemporary local records. Grando is supposed to have terrorized his former village sixteen years after his death. Eventually he was decapitated by the local priest and villagers. The Carniolan scientist Johann Weikhard von Valvasor wrote about Jure Grando Alilović's life and afterlife in his extensive work The Glory of the Duchy of Carniola when he visited Kringa during his travels. This was the first written document on vampires. Grando was also mentioned in writings by Erasmus Francisci and Johann Joseph von Goerres (La mystique divine, naturelle, et diabolique, Paris 1855), whose story was much more elaborate, full of fantastic details to make the story more interesting and sensational. In modern times, the Croatian writer Boris Perić has researched the legend and written a book (The Vampire) on the story.

Striga are mentioned by the Moldavian statesman and soldier Dimitrie Cantemir in his work Descriptio Moldaviae (1714–1716). He thought that the striga were mostly Moldavian and Transylvanian beliefs. However, he associated them with witches or warlocks rather than blood-drinking undead vampires. The book mentions dunking – a traditional test for witchcraft – as a method of identifying a striga.

=== Modern writings ===
An 1865 article on Transylvanian folklore by Wilhelm Schmidt describes the strigoi as nocturnal creatures that preyed on infants. He reports a tradition in which, upon the birth of a child, one tosses a stone behind oneself and exclaims "This into the mouth of the strigoi!"

In 1909, Franz Hartmann mentioned in his article "An Authenticated Vampire Story", published in The Occult Review, that peasant children from a village in the Carpathian Mountains started to die mysteriously. The villagers began to suspect a recently deceased count was a vampire, dwelling in his old fortress. Frightened villagers burned the castle to stop the deaths.

=== Communist era ===
In his book In Search of Dracula, The History of Dracula and Vampires, Radu Florescu mentions an event in 1969 in the city of Căpățâneni, where after the death of an old man, several family members began to die in suspicious circumstances. Unearthed, the corpse did not show signs of decomposition, his eyes were wide open, and his face was red and twisted. The corpse was burned to save his soul.

During the Romanian Revolution of 1989, the corpse of Nicolae Ceaușescu did not receive a proper burial. This made the ghost of the former dictator a threat in the minds of superstitious Romanians. A revolutionary activist, Gelu Voican Voiculescu, who had participated in the Ceaușescu trial and execution, carpeted his own apartment with braids of garlic, allegedly as a traditional remedy against the strigoi.

=== Post-communist era ===
In February 2004, a woman from the village of Marotinu de Sus in Dolj County claimed that she had been visited by her late uncle, a 76-year-old Romanian man named Petre Toma who had died in December the previous year. Fearing the deceased might have become a strigoi, the woman's brother-in-law, Gheorghe Marinescu, organized a vampire hunting group made up of several family members. After drinking some alcohol, they dug up the coffin of Petre Toma, made an incision in his chest, and tore the heart out. After removal of the heart, the body was burned and the ashes were mixed in water and drunk by Toma's niece, believing that this would put an end to the haunting. Dolj County police later arrested six of the family members who participated in the ritual, charging them with "disturbing the peace of the dead". They were sentenced to six months' imprisonment and ordered to pay damages to the family of the deceased. Since then, in the nearby village of Amărăştii de Sus, people drive a fire-hardened stake through the heart or belly of the dead as a "preventive measure".

== Mythology ==
=== Creation ===
The encyclopedist Dimitrie Cantemir and the folklorist Teodor Burada in his book Datinile Poporului român la înmormântări published in 1882 refer to cases of strigoism. The strigoi can be a living man, born under certain conditions:

- Be the seventh child of the same sex in a family
- Lead a life of sin
- Die without being married
- Executed for perjury
- Die by suicide
- Die from a witch's curse

The strigoi are said to be bald on top of the head, do not eat garlic or onions, avoid incense, and towards the feast of Saint Andrew (30 November) they sleep outdoors. Their spine is elongated in the shape of a tail, covered with hair.

If there is a drought in a village, it means that there is a strigoi that prevents the rains. If it rains with stones (hail), God punishes the strigoi who does not let "clean rain fall", and if it rains with sun, it is believed that one of the strigoi has been killed.

The strigoi take the milk from the cows, take the manna of the wheat, the strength of the people, stop the rains, bring hail and bring death among men and cattle. On Saint George's day (April 23), the boys water the girls so that they don't suffer from strigoi, but also so that they don't turn into these creatures.

To kill them, the grave of the supposed strigoi is searched and the order is read to him by the priests and an oak, yew or branch is struck in his heart, it is pierced with a nail or a knife, to remain bound of the coffin and not being able to go out to do mischief.

=== Types ===
Tudor Pamfile in his book Mitologie românească compiles all appellations of strigoi in Romania strâgoi, Moroi in western Transylvania, Wallachia and Oltenia, vidmă in Bucovina, vârcolacul, Cel-rau, or vampire. The types described are:

- Strigoaică: a witch.
- Strigoi viu: a living strigoi or sorcerer.
- Strigoi mort: a dead strigoi, the most dangerous. They emerge from their graves in order to torment their families until their relatives die.

=== Prevention and protection ===
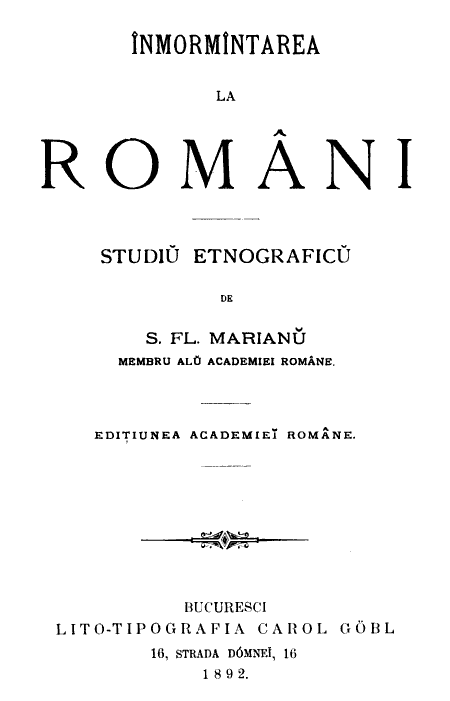
Înmormîntarea la Români (Romanian burial) written by Simion Florea Marian

A common way used to identify a vampire was to place a 7-year-old boy of 'purity' dressed in white on a white horse near the graveyard at midday. It was believed that the horse would stop at the grave of the suspected vampire.

In 1887, French geographer Élisée Reclus details burials in Romania: "If the deceased has red hair, he is very concerned that he was back in the form of dog, frog, flea or bedbug, and that it enters into houses at night to suck the blood of beautiful young girls. So it is prudent to nail the coffin heavily, or, better yet, a stake through the chest of the corpse."

Simeon Florea Marian in Înmormântarea la români (1892) describes another preventive method, unearthing and beheading, then re-interring the corpse and head face-down.

The Dracula Scrapbook by Peter Haining, published by New English Library editions in 1976, reported that the meat of a pig killed on the 17 October, the feast day of Saint Ignatius, was a good way to guard against vampires, according to Romanian legend.

== Other uses ==
Strigoiulu (the Strigoi) was the name of a Romanian-language satirical magazine published briefly in 1862 in Pest.

== See also ==
- Burial at crossroads
- Christmas in Romania § Advent
- Folklore of Romania
- List of ghosts
- Moroi
- Pricolici
- Shtriga
- Strzyga
- Suangi
- Vampires in popular culture § Strigoi
- Vǎrkolak
- Leyak
