= Suangi =

A suangi (Indonesian pronunciation: [suˈaŋi]) is a common name of a male who is suspected, and therefore accused, of being a witch in the belief system of local people in western Papua, Indonesia. Suangis are said to eat the blood and/or internal organs of their victims and then stuff the bodies with leaves and grass. They are also believed to devour the person's soul. After being attacked, the zombified victim is then said to return home where they seem to have fallen mysteriously ill. If a victim is able to name the suangi that has attacked him, they are often killed and eaten by the victim's family in the belief that it will free the person's spirit.

== See also ==
- Strigoi
- Aswang
