= Strzyga =

Female demon in Slavic mythology

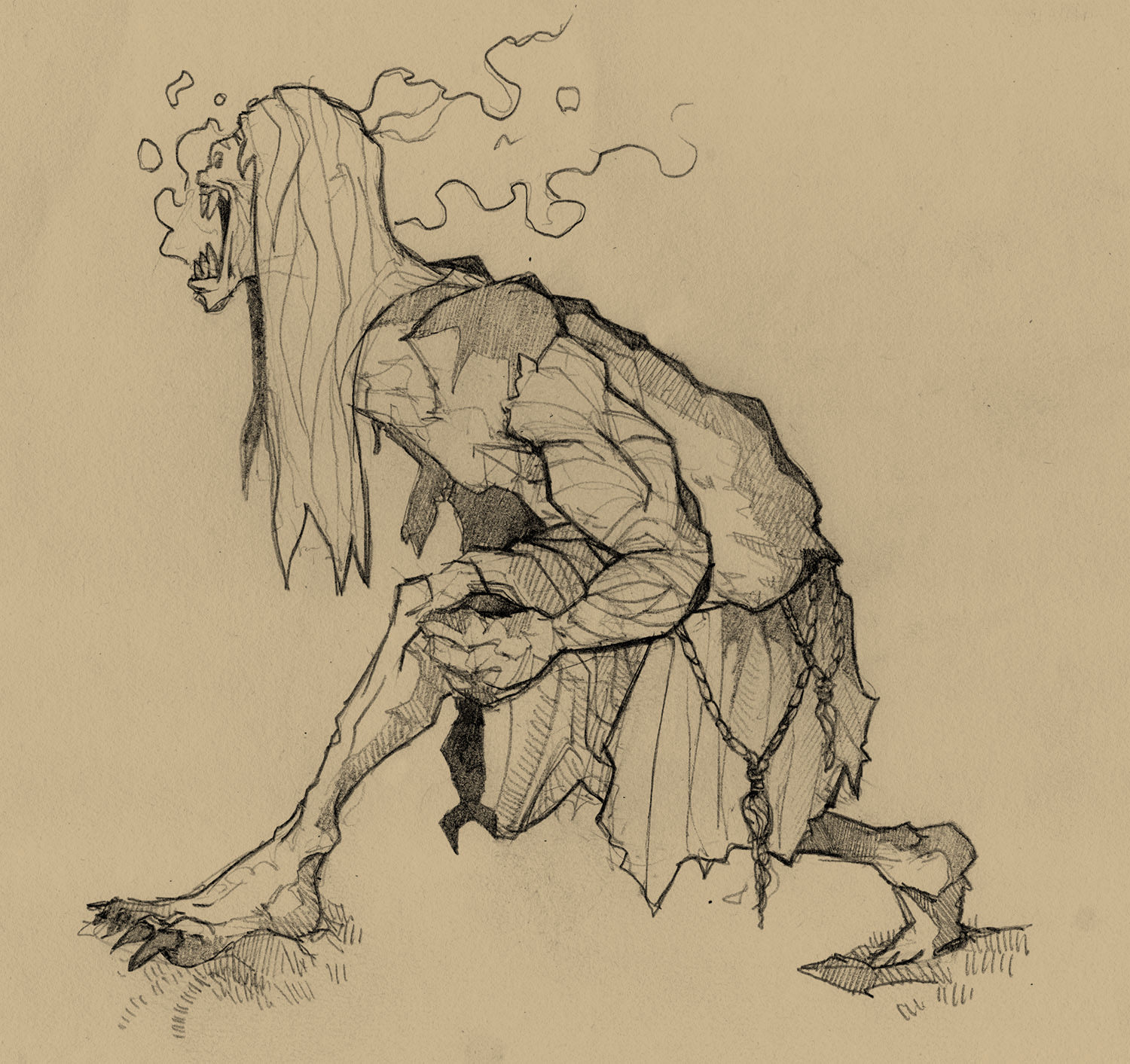
Strzyga, an artistic vision by Filip Gutowski. Excerpt from The Sarmatian Bestiarium by Janek Sielicki

Strzyga (Polish pronunciation: [ˈstʂɨɡa], plural: strzygi, masculine: strzygoń), sometimes translated as striga, (which is also the Latin term for it) is usually a female demon in Slavic mythology, which stems from the mythological Strix of ancient Rome and ancient Greece. The demon is similar to a vampire, and is predominantly found in Polish and Silesian folklore.

== Etymology and origin ==
According to Aleksander Brückner, the word is derived from Strix, Latin for owl and a bird-like creature which fed on human flesh and blood in Roman and Greek mythology. Hungarian sztriga, the Albanian shtriga and Romanian: strigă are also cognate and related.

It is unclear how the word strzyga was adapted by the Polish people, though it might have been through the Balkan peoples. The term strzyga could also sometimes mean a vampire or upiór. After the 18th century, there was a distinction between strzyga and upiór; the first one was more connected to witchcraft, while the latter was more of a flying, vampiric creature.

The strzyga remained a popular element in the folklore of rural Poland well into the late 19th and early 20th century, as shown by Władysław Reymont in his Nobel Prize-winning novel Chłopi (The Peasants). Its story takes place during the 1880s in Congress Poland and follows the everyday life of the peasantry in a typical Polish village. In the tenth chapter of book two, some of the characters gather together to exchange stories and legends, in one of which the striga is described as having a bat's wings (strzygi z nietoperzowymi skrzydłami przelatują).

== Beliefs ==
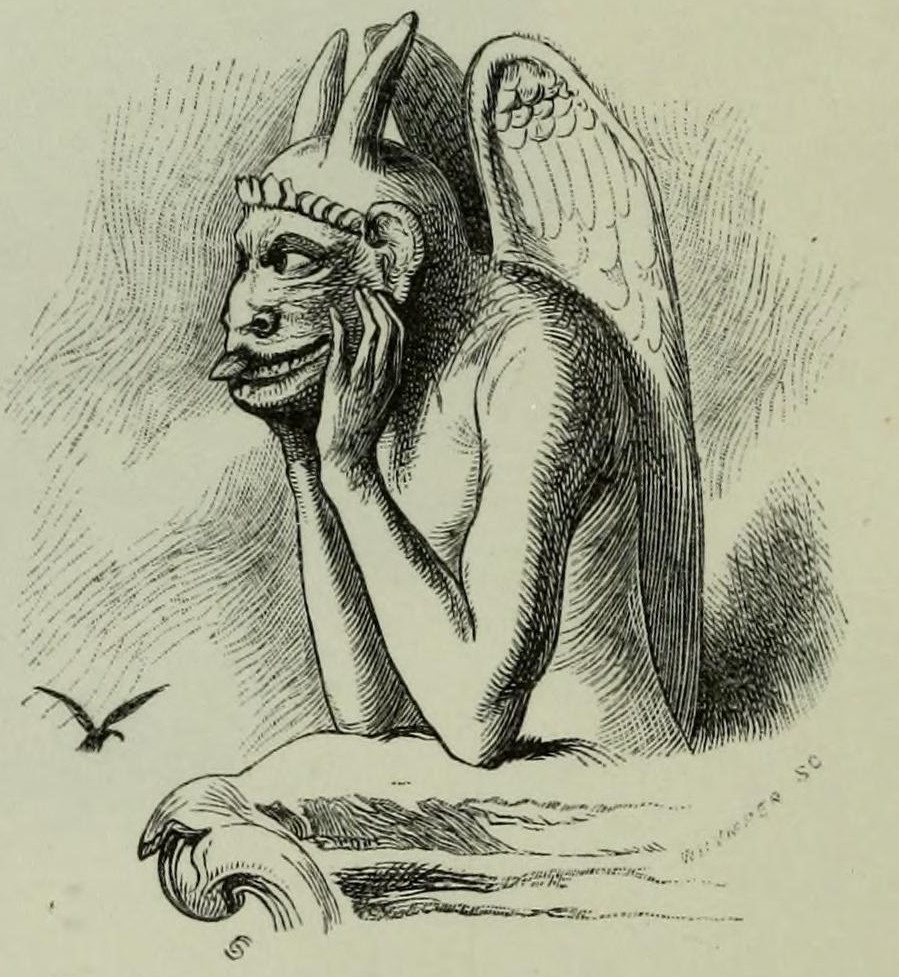
Scrambles amongst the Alps, an illustration by Edward Whymper of the Notre Dame Cathedral gargoyle called La Stryge.

A strzyga is a usually female demon similar to vampire in Slavic (and especially Polish) folklore. People who were born with two hearts and two souls, and two sets of teeth (the second one barely visible) were believed to be strzygi. Somnambulics or people without armpit hair could also be seen as ones. Furthermore, a newborn child with already developed teeth was also believed to be one. When a person was identified as a strzyga, they were chased away from human dwelling places. During epidemics, people were getting buried alive, and those who managed to get out of their graves, often weak, ill and with mutilated hands, were said to be strzygi by others. It is said that strzygi usually died at a young age, but, according to belief, only one of their two souls would pass to the afterlife; the other soul was believed to cause the deceased strzyga to come back to life and prey upon other living beings. These undead creatures were believed to fly at night in a form of an owl and attack night-time travelers and people who had wandered off into the woods at night, sucking out their blood and eating their insides. Strzyga were also believed to be satisfied with animal blood, for a short period of time. According to the other sources, strzygi were believed not to harm people but to herald someone's imminent death. In this, they resemble banshees.

=== Methods of protection ===
When a person believed to be a strzyga died, decapitating the corpse and burying the head separate from the rest of the body was believed to prevent the strzyga from rising from the dead; burying the body face down with a sickle around its head was believed to work as well. Other methods of protection from the strzyga (some similar to those from vampires) included:

- Burning the body
- Hammering nails, stakes etc. into various parts of the strzyga's body
- Putting a flint into its mouth after exhumation
- Pealing the church bells (the strzyga then turns into tar)
- Slapping it across the face with one's left hand
- Burying it again, outside of the village, and pinning it down with a big rock
- Scattering poppy seeds in the shape of the cross in every corner of the house
- Exhumation in the presence of a priest and burying the body again, after additional rituals (such as putting a piece of paper with the word "Jesus" written on it under the strzyga's tongue)
- Putting small objects in the strzyga's grave to make it count them.

== See also ==
- Dziwożona
- Mare
- Shtriga
- Strigoi
- Strix (mythology)
- Vampire
- Upiór
