= Supernatural season 1 =

Season of television series

Supernatural
- Season 1
- DVD cover art
- Showrunner: Eric Kripke
- Starring: Jared Padalecki; Jensen Ackles
- No. of episodes: 22

Release
- Original network: The WB
- Original release: September 13, 2005 – May 4, 2006

Season chronology
- Next → Season 2

The first season of Supernatural, an American dark fantasy television series created by Eric Kripke, premiered on September 13, 2005, and concluded on May 4, 2006, after 22 episodes. It focuses on brothers Sam and Dean Winchester as they track down their father, John, who is on the trail of the demon who killed their mother and Sam's girlfriend. During their travels, they use their father's journal to help them carry on the family business—saving people and hunting supernatural creatures. Jared Padalecki and Jensen Ackles star as Sam and Dean, with Jeffrey Dean Morgan recurring as their father, John, and Nicki Aycox as the demonic Meg Masters. This is the only season to air on The WB, with all subsequent seasons airing on The CW, a joint venture of The WB and UPN.

The first sixteen episodes of the season aired on Tuesdays at 9:00 pm ET in the United States, after which the series was rescheduled to Thursdays. Overall, the season averaged about 3.81 million American viewers. The season gained many award nominations, among them two Primetime Emmy Awards for work done on the pilot episode. While some critics did not like the mostly anthology-like format, others praised the show for the emotional moments and noted the brotherly chemistry between the lead actors.

The season was internationally syndicated, airing in the United Kingdom on ITV, in Canada on Citytv, and in Australia on Network Ten. The first season was released on DVD as a six-disc box set on September 5, 2006, by Warner Home Video in Region 1. Although the season was split into two separate releases in Region 2, the complete set was released on October 2, 2006, and in Region 4 on October 2, 2007. The episodes are also available through digital retailers such as Apple's iTunes Store, Microsoft's Xbox Live Marketplace (now Microsoft Store), and Amazon.com's on-demand TV service.

== Cast and characters ==
=== Main ===
- Jared Padalecki as Sam Winchester
- Jensen Ackles as Dean Winchester

=== Recurring ===
- Jeffrey Dean Morgan as John Winchester and Azazel (Note: Before possessing John (Morgan) in the season finale "Devil's Trap", the demon Azazel had been only depicted in silhouette during his previous appearances.)
- Nicki Aycox as Meg Masters

=== Guest ===
- Adrianne Palicki as Jessica Moore
- Samantha Smith as Mary Winchester
- Sarah Shahi as Constance Welch
- Graham Wardle as Tommy Collins
- Loretta Devine as Missouri Moseley
- A. J. Buckley as Ed Zeddmore
- Travis Wester as Harry Spangler
- Taylor Cole as Sarah Blake
- Christine Chatelain as Jenny
- Sebastian Spence as Tom
- Jim Beaver as Bobby Singer

== Episodes ==
In this table, the number in the first column refers to the episode's number within the entire series, whereas the number in the second column indicates the episode's number within this particular season. "U.S. viewers in millions" refers to how many Americans watched the episode live or on the day of broadcast.

No. overall	No. in season	Title	Directed by	Written by	Original release date	Prod. code	U.S. viewers (millions)
1	1	"Pilot"	David Nutter	Eric Kripke	September 13, 2005	475285	5.69
When they were children, Sam (Padalecki) and Dean Winchester's (Ackles) mother Mary (Samantha Smith) died a violent and unexplainable death, which in turn led their father, John Winchester (Jeffrey Dean Morgan), to teach them hunting skills in search of the creature that took her life. 22 years later, while attending Stanford University, Sam is forced back into the paranormal world by Dean, who has come to tell him that their father is missing. The two travel to Jericho, California, to find him, but their search is put on hold when they discover that a ghostly Woman in White (Sarah Shahi)—the spirit of a woman who drowned her children and then killed herself—has been taking male victims. They investigate, but Dean is arrested for impersonating a federal agent. However, he manages to escape custody, and saves his brother from the vengeful spirit. The Woman in White is finally put to rest after the brothers force her to confront the spirits of her children. Sam later returns home but discovers his girlfriend Jessica (Adrianne Palicki) pinned to the ceiling. He is then forced to watch as she is killed in the same supernatural manner as his mother was. Jessica's death prompts him to return to the life of hunting with Dean.
2	2	"Wendigo"	David Nutter	Story by : Ron Milbauer & Terri Hughes Burton; Teleplay by : Eric Kripke	September 20, 2005	2T6901	5.01
After having no luck in the investigation of Jessica's death, the brothers follow instructions found in their father's journal and head to Blackwater Ridge, Lost Creek, Colorado. Posing as park rangers, they help a young woman named Haley (Gina Holden) and her younger brother Ben (Alden Ehrenreich) search for their lost older brother Tommy (Graham Wardle), who disappeared while on a camping trip. As they are hiking through the woods, they stumble across a shredded campsite. After investigating a cry for help, they return to the campsite to discover all of their gear is stolen. Sam and Dean soon realize that Tommy was taken by a wendigo that has terrorized the woods since 1936. While searching, Haley and Dean are kidnapped by the creature, but Sam and Ben are able to track them to a mine. After Dean, Haley, and Tommy are freed, they kill the wendigo with a flare gun.
3	3	"Dead in the Water"	Kim Manners	Sera Gamble & Raelle Tucker	September 27, 2005	2T6903	5.01
Taking a break from the search for their father, Sam and Dean head to Lake Manitoc in Wisconsin for a possible case. Three drownings have occurred there within a year, with the dead bodies mysteriously disappearing in the lake. The brothers soon come to believe that an avenging spirit of a young boy haunts the lake, and learn that the local sheriff (Daniel Hugh Kelly) and the father of the latest victim accidentally caused his death when they were children. Out for revenge, the spirit targets the sheriff's daughter Andrea (Amy Acker) and mute grandson Lucas (Nico McEown). It eventually pulls Lucas into the lake, so the sheriff gives himself over to the spirit, saving his grandson.
4	4	"Phantom Traveler"	Robert Singer	Richard Hatem	October 4, 2005	2T6904	5.40
The brothers are asked by a man whom Dean and his father had previously rescued to investigate the mysterious crash of a commercial airplane that left only seven survivors, with signs pointing to a demonically-possessed passenger causing the accident. When they realize that the demon is now eliminating the survivors one by one, Dean is forced to face his fear of flying by following its next target (Jaime Ray Newman) aboard an airliner. He and Sam manage to get the demon into the galley on-board, but it flees its host during the exorcism. Despite this, they continue the ritual, sending the demon back to Hell. Afterwards they get a surprise when the man who called them revealed he got their phone number from their father's voicemail. Though John doesn't answer when they call, they get their first indication that he's alive as his phone has been down since his disappearance.
5	5	"Bloody Mary"	Peter Ellis	Story by : Eric Kripke; Teleplay by : Ron Milbauer & Terri Hughes Burton	October 11, 2005	2T6905	5.50
When a man is killed—his eyeballs having exploded—after his daughter chants "Bloody Mary" three times in front of a mirror, Sam and Dean head to Toledo, Ohio, to investigate. They learn that Bloody Mary (Jovanna Huguet) is the ghost of a young woman who was murdered after her eyes were cut out, and her spirit trapped within the mirror that she died in front of. With the mirror now for sale in an antique store in the town, Bloody Mary has begun to target those nearby who secretly feel guilt over another's death. The brothers must find a way to stop her after a young girl (Marnette Patterson) inadvertently becomes her next target. They track down the original mirror and then smash it, but this only releases Bloody Mary. However, Dean forces her to see her own reflection, and her guilt over her own secrets causes her to destroy herself.
6	6	"Skin"	Robert Duncan McNeill	John Shiban	October 18, 2005	2T6906	5.00
After Zach (Aleks Holtz), a college friend of Sam's, is arrested for murdering his girlfriend, the brothers head to St. Louis, Missouri, to investigate. Zach's sister Becky (Amy Grabow) claims that he was with her at the time of the murder, although security footage places him at the scene of the crime. After a similar murder occurs, they realize that the real culprit is a being with shape-shifting abilities. The shapeshifter then captures the two, and plans to use Dean's form to kill Becky. The brothers escape and alert the police. Becky is saved, but the police believe Dean to be her attacker. As Dean later searches through the shape-shifter's lair, Sam visits Becky to make sure that she knows what they are dealing with. However, she reveals herself to be the shape-shifter and knocks Sam unconscious before morphing back into Dean. After the real Dean finds the real Becky tied up in the lair, he confronts the shape-shifter and shoots it dead while still in his form causing the police to declare Dean dead and end the manhunt for him.
7	7	"Hook Man"	David Jackson	John Shiban	October 25, 2005	2T6902	5.08
Sam and Dean head to Ankeny, Iowa to investigate the brutal death of a college student, and the victim's girlfriend Lori (Jane McGregor) says that the attacker was invisible. More attacks occur, with the victims seemingly connected to the girl. The brothers believe that the killer is the Hook Man, and research indicates that it is the vengeful spirit of Jacob Karns, a preacher who murdered 13 prostitutes in 1862 with the hook that replaced his lost hand and was later put to death for his crimes. Despite the man being buried in an unmarked grave, Dean manages to locate it and burn his bones, but it has no effect. To stop the spirit, they must destroy the hook, which was reforged into an unknown object by the church after Karns' death. In order to be sure, they burn everything silver in the church, but it doesn't stop the Hook Man. Lori and the brothers are confronted by the Hook Man. As they fight him, Sam realizes that Lori's cross necklace—given to her by her reverend father—is made of silver, and the spirit vanishes once it is burned.
8	8	"Bugs"	Kim Manners	Rachel Nave & Bill Coakley	November 8, 2005	2T6907	4.47
After a construction worker for a new housing development dies in a sinkhole, his brain dissolving within minutes, the brothers head to Oasis Plains, Oklahoma, to investigate. There they learn of mysterious, bug-related deaths in the town. After doing research, they discover that the land under development was the site of a Native-American settlement erased by US Cavalry massacres in the early 19th century, and that the chief had laid a curse on the land as he died. Sam and Dean determine that the curse will reach its climax that night, and race to warn the family living there as swarms of insects attack. They are able to fight off the bugs and survive through the night, and the insects leave at sunrise. The site is shut down temporarily as the boys discovered an unmarked Native American grave and the developer, whose family they saved from the bugs, decides to make sure it remains shut down.
9	9	"Home"	Ken Girotti	Eric Kripke	November 15, 2005	2T6908	4.21
Sam has nightmares of a family being attacked by a supernatural entity in his and Dean's childhood home, prompting the brothers to return to Lawrence, Kansas, to investigate. They enlist the help of their father's psychic friend, Missouri Mosley (Loretta Devine), to rid the house of a poltergeist. Though Missouri claims to have purified the house, Sam does not believe it was successful, so the brothers watch over the house. When the poltergeist returns, Sam's premonition starts to come true. The brothers rush in to rescue the family, but they themselves are saved by the spirit of their mother, who sacrifices herself to stop the poltergeist. Unknown to them, their father is at Missouri's house and though he dearly wants to see his children, he informs her that he can't until he knows the truth about something.
10	10	"Asylum"	Guy Bee	Richard Hatem	November 22, 2005	2T6909	5.38
Sam and Dean receive a tip from their father, and travel to Rockford, Illinois, to investigate the haunted Roosevelt Asylum, where criminally insane patients rioted in 1964. One of the riot's victims was the chief psychiatrist (Norman Armour). The spirits there try to communicate rather than attack, leading the brothers to discover that the psychiatrist had been conducting cruel experiments on his patients like trepanation (it was implied that he was also practicing it due to diagrams in the background and the belief at the time it could relieve cranial pressure) and others in order to test his theory that provoking extreme anger would be therapeutic for them. The ghost of the doctor then confronts Sam, causing him to lose his sanity and try to kill his brother. Dean manages to subdue Sam and burn the doctor's corpse, stopping the spirit and returning Sam to normal. In the end, Sam answers Dean's cellphone to find their father calling them.
11	11	"Scarecrow"	Kim Manners	Story by : Patrick Sean Smith; Teleplay by : John Shiban	January 10, 2006	2T6911	4.23
John calls Sam and Dean, telling them he is hunting the thing that killed their mother and it is a demon. However, instead of letting them help, he tells them to investigate the disappearances of young couples in rural Burkitsville, Indiana, Sam reveals to Dean that he would rather track down their father, prompting the two to angrily separate. As Sam meets a fellow hitchhiker named Meg Masters (Nicki Aycox), Dean starts the investigation and saves a traveling couple from a living scarecrow. Dean calls Sam about the creature, and discovers that a Vanir is being summoned in the form of a scarecrow to protect the town in exchange for annual sacrifices, with a sacred tree in the town giving it power. Because the couple intended for the ritual escaped, the townspeople choose Dean and Emily (Tania Saulnier)—a girl who lives in town with her aunt and uncle—to be the new sacrifices. However, Sam returns and rescues them, and the scarecrow instead takes Emily's aunt and uncle as its victims. The next morning, Emily and the brothers burn the sacred tree, and then leave town. Meanwhile, Meg hitches a ride on the highway, but slits the driver's throat, collecting his blood into a goblet and using it to communicate with an unknown being whom she calls father.
12	12	"Faith"	Allan Kroeker	Sera Gamble & Raelle Tucker	January 17, 2006	2T6910	3.86
While battling a Rawhead, Dean gets electrocuted and his heart is damaged. Doctors give him only a few weeks to live. Sam searches for a way to save him and believes he may have found an answer in a preacher who claims to heal the incurable (Kevin McNulty). At the congregation, Dean is chosen, and is cured of his condition. However, he and Sam soon learn that an openly gay teacher died of a heart attack at the same moment that Dean was healed. Further research reveals that deaths occurred in unison with other healings, prompting the brothers to believe that the preacher is using black magic to control a Reaper; healing people in exchange for the lives of those he deems immoral. However, they eventually discover that his wife (Rebecca Jenkins) is behind everything, and rush to destroy the altar used to control the Reaper. The preacher begins to "heal" Layla (Julie Benz), a young woman with a brain tumor, and the Reaper then goes after Dean. Sam destroys the altar, and the freed Reaper takes the wife's life, though the young woman is not healed. She later tells Dean that she has made peace with her coming death, and Dean promises to pray for her.
13	13	"Route 666"	Paul Shapiro	Eugenie Ross-Leming & Brad Buckner	January 31, 2006	2T6912	5.82
Dean is contacted by his first love, Cassie (Megalyn Echikunwoke), who asks him to come to Cape Girardeau, Missouri to investigate a string of racially motivated murders, one of which was her father. Each murder is linked to a mysterious truck that seems to have no driver and leave no tracks. Throughout the episode, Dean struggles to come to grips with his residual feelings for Cassie, eventually leading to them having sex. The brothers later discover that Cassie's mother (Kathleen Noone), a white woman, left her boyfriend, Cyrus, for Cassie's African-American father. Cyrus tried to kill him out of anger, but he gained the upper hand and ended up beating Cyrus to death, dumping Cyrus' body and truck in a nearby swamp. The boys assume that Cyrus' spirit has returned and is out for revenge against everyone connected to his death. They attempt to put Cyrus to rest by burning his remains in rusted out truck in the swamp. However, the ghostly truck appears and attempts to run Dean down, and they realize that Cyrus' evil personality had infected the truck, and led it to take on a life of its own. The brothers end up defeating it by having Dean lead it in a chase and tricking it into driving onto the hallowed ground of an old, burned down church causing the hallowed ground to destroy it. In the end, Dean and Cassie realize they cannot be together due to the former's responsibilities as a hunter and part with a kiss.
14	14	"Nightmare"	Phil Sgriccia	Sera Gamble & Raelle Tucker	February 7, 2006	2T6913	4.27
Sam has a premonition of a man being killed in Saginaw, Michigan, but the murder is made to look like a suicide. They talk to the victim's son Max (Brendan Fletcher) and fail to find anything supernatural, but warn Max's uncle to be careful. When he, too, dies a mysterious death, Sam and Dean believe the family to be cursed. However, their investigation reveals that Max was regularly beaten by his father and uncle as a child. Sam then has another vision of Max using telekinetic abilities to kill his stepmother, angry at her for not having stopped the abuse. The brothers stop Max, and Sam learns from him that, when he was a baby, his mother also died in the same manner as theirs. When Max's anger suddenly resurfaces, he locks Sam in the closet. Sam receives another premonition, showing Max killing Dean. Trying to escape, Sam manages to telekinetically free himself and talks Max out of killing them. A distraught Max then takes his own life.
15	15	"The Benders"	Peter Ellis	John Shiban	February 14, 2006	2T6914	3.96
Sam and Dean head to Hibbing, Minnesota, where a young boy witnesses a man disappear. While investigating, Sam is also abducted. Dean pretends to be a police officer in search of his brother, and teams up with Deputy Kathleen Hudak (Jessica Steen). Although she soon learns Dean's true identity, she allows him to continue investigating with her, as her own brother went missing in the same manner three years before. Despite this, she does not trust him, and handcuffs him to her car when they find the kidnappers' property. Kathleen is soon captured, and learns that the culprits are a human family who hunt and kill people for sport. Dean frees himself and goes after her, but is also captured. However, this distracts the family long enough for Sam and Kathleen to break out from their cages, and the three of them subdue their captors. When Kathleen is later alone with the father, he taunts her about her brother's death, and she shoots him, planning to tell the police that he tried to escape. She then allows the brothers to leave before more police and the FBI arrive to take the surviving Benders into custody.
16	16	"Shadow"	Kim Manners	Eric Kripke	February 28, 2006	2T6915	4.22
While investigating an animalistic death in Chicago, Illinois, the brothers find a symbol of blood, which Dean later learns is connected to a Zoroastrian creature known as a daeva. They later run into Meg Masters, and Sam's suspicions of her lead him to discover that she was behind the murder. They confront her, but she reveals that it is all part of a trap set to capture their father. Sam and Dean manage to turn the daevas against her, and she is thrown out of a window several stories to the ground below. When they return to their motel room, they find their father waiting for them, but Meg returns and once again sends the daevas after them. Sam dispels the daevas with lighting flares long enough for them to escape. John then once again leaves his sons, feeling that they are vulnerable when all together.
17	17	"Hell House"	Chris Long	Trey Callaway	March 30, 2006	2T6916	3.76
As a prank, teens spread the word that a local house is haunted by the ghost of Mordechai Murdoch, a man who reportedly killed his six daughters during the 1930s, and it ends up listed on the urban legend website Hell Hound's Lair. When it soon appears that the house actually is haunted, the brothers head to Richardson, Texas, to investigate, and run into paranormal investigators Ed Zeddmore and Harry Spengler (A. J. Buckley and Travis Wester), owners of the website. Although their research shows no truth in the legend, the brothers nevertheless encounter the spirit, but it is different from what the legend describes. When Sam and Dean realize that the Mordechai's origins on Hell Hound's Lair has also changed, they theorize that the spirit is actually a Tulpa brought on by a Tibetan spirit sigil painted by the teens as a joke, with the beliefs of the website's visitors causing the story to become reality. The brothers trick Ed and Harry into posting a vulnerability for Mordechai onto their website, and later return to the house to kill him. However, Ed and Harry are also there, and reveal that the website's server crashed. With the Tulpa unaffected, Dean decides to burn the house down to stop the entity.
18	18	"Something Wicked"	Whitney Ransick	Daniel Knauf	April 6, 2006	2T6917	3.67
On a tip from their father, Sam and Dean head to Fitchburg, Wisconsin, to investigate a case in which children have fallen into comas. They soon discover that the creature responsible is a vampiric witch known as a shtriga, which is stealing life force from the kids. Dean reveals to Sam that their father had previously attempted to kill the creature when they were young, and that Dean's recklessness almost cost Sam his life and allowed the shtriga to escape. As the shtriga can only be killed while feeding, Sam and Dean convince the son of the motel owner, whose brother was a victim, to help them lay a trap. Though the trap fails and Sam is nearly killed, Dean is able to kill the shtriga in the end. The children's life force returns to them with the shtriga's death and they recover though Sam bemoans the loss of innocence of the boy who helped them.
19	19	"Provenance"	Phil Sgriccia	David Ehrman	April 13, 2006	2T6918	3.62
After a young couple is found brutally murdered in upstate New York within a locked house, the brothers investigate, and learn from their father's journal that similar deaths have occurred in the area over the past few decades. All of the couple's belongings were taken to an auction house, so they check to see if a ghost may have attached itself to an object. After asking Sarah Blake (Taylor Cole), the daughter of the auction house's owner out on a date, Sam is able to get copies of the provenances of the items. Dean discovers that a painted portrait from 1910 of the Isaiah Merchant family had belonged to all of the other murder victims, and that Merchant had killed his entire family and then himself. Realizing that the painting is haunted, the brothers burn it, but it later repairs itself. Dean tracks down Merchant's body and cremates it, but when Sam and Sarah attempt to destroy the painting again, the ghost of Merchant's daughter emerges from it, having been the true killer all along. Dean finds an antique doll with the girl's hair in the mausoleum, and the ghost disappears after he burns it. Afterward, the painting is finally destroyed and the brothers leave town, but not before Sam kisses Sarah goodbye.
20	20	"Dead Man's Blood"	Tony Wharmby	Cathryn Humphris & John Shiban	April 20, 2006	2T6919	3.99
When an old vampire hunter is targeted by a group of vampires, he tries to attack them with an old Colt pistol, but is killed before he can fire a shot. Returning to the nest, the vampire Kate (Anne Openshaw) gives the Colt to her mate, the leader Luther (Warren Christie). When Dean recognizes the murdered hunter's name in the newspaper, he and Sam head to Manning, Colorado, and discover a letter addressed to their father, who suddenly returns. The letter reveals to him that the gun is mystical and capable of killing anything. Realizing that they can use it to finally kill Azazel, the demon responsible for their mother's death, the Winchesters capture Kate and attempt to trade her to Luther in exchange for the gun. John makes the trade while Sam and Dean rescue the vampires victims, under orders to leave afterwards. During the negotiation, Luther attacks John, and the brothers intervene, killing most of the remaining vampires. John retrieves the gun, and the legend of the Colt is proven to be true as he shoots Luther dead. Kate and another female vampire flee and John finally accepts that the Winchesters are stronger as a family and invites Sam and Dean to join him in hunting Azazel.
21	21	"Salvation"	Robert Singer	Sera Gamble & Raelle Tucker	April 27, 2006	2T6920	3.26
As Meg begins to target the Winchesters' friends in order to force them to hand over the Colt, John reveals to his sons the research on Azazel that he has accumulated over the years. Signs point to Salvation, Iowa, as the location of the demon's next target, so the trio heads there to investigate. After Sam has a premonition, he is able to identify the next victim. Before they can formulate a plan, Meg calls and threatens to kill more of their friends unless they hand over the gun. John concedes to her demand, but tries to deliver a fake one, and is captured. Meanwhile, Sam and Dean are able to save the family from Azazel, but he escapes as Sam tries to kill him. At the end of the episode, Sam and Dean learn of their father's capture when they call him and Meg answers the phone instead.
22	22	"Devil's Trap"	Kim Manners	Eric Kripke	May 4, 2006	2T6921	3.99
After learning that their father has been captured, the brothers go to family friend and fellow hunter Bobby Singer (Jim Beaver) for help. However, Meg tracks them down, but is caught underneath a mystical symbol known as a "devil's trap", which renders her immobilized and powerless. The brothers proceed to exorcise the demon though they know it will kill the real Meg due to her injuries sustained in Chicago. Before the real Meg dies, she offers a clue to John's whereabouts. Sam and Dean head to Jefferson City, Missouri, and rescue their father. However, Azazel soon reveals himself to be possessing John, and attacks them. As Azazel tortures Dean, John is able to temporarily gain control, and begs Sam to use the Colt to kill Azazel. Not able to bring himself to kill his father, Sam instead shoots him in the leg, and Azazel flees. On the way to the hospital, the three are then crashed into by a large semi-truck with a demonically possessed driver.

== Production ==
=== Writing ===
The first season's mythology mainly follows Sam and Dean's search for their missing father. Series creator Eric Kripke summarized this storyline as merely "find Dad", which he deemed "simple", "emotional", and "clean". However, he found the self-enclosed episodes—independent stories which attain closure at the end of each episode and add little to the overarching storylines—to be "hit and miss". Because the first ten episodes consist of self-enclosed stories, the series mythology does not begin until the eleventh episode, "Scarecrow". This episode introduces the demon Meg Masters, which executive producer Kim Manners felt was "desperately needed". Though uncertain at exactly what direction to take the character, the writers intended Meg to be an antagonist for the Winchesters throughout her story arc. The series mythology further expands with the addition of the demon-killing Colt handgun near the season's end, lending to the "modern American Western" theme the producers were going for.

You can't just hold up a cross and expect a vampire to cower away—that's not real. Everything that people know classically about vampires is wrong, so that just gave us an opportunity to plant our own flag and create our own creature.

— Kripke on Supernatural's divergence from classical folklore.

Although the weekly adversaries for the Winchesters were often based on urban legends, the writers tried to put their own spin on the stories for each of the episodes. For example, Kripke combined the well-known urban legend of the vanishing hitchhiker with the Mexican legend of La Llorona to give the spirit more motivation and characterization in the pilot. The episode "Hook Man", however, borrowed three or four elements from the numerous variations of the Hook Man legend. The figure is an escaped mental patient in the traditional myth, but the writers decided for the purposes of the show to make him the ghost of a hook-handed killer. They also added a poltergeist element by having him attached to the conflicting emotions of the guest star—she wears a cross made from his melted hook. Rather than focus on modern interpretations, Kripke and co-executive producer John Shiban decided that Supernatural's vampires would stem more from the original legends. The vampires were given retractable fangs—these were inspired by the rowed teeth of sharks—as well as no aversion to sunlight or the crucifix. Kripke personally added the fact that vampires would become weak if given the blood of a dead man.

Other aspects grew out of basic concepts or ideas. For the episode "Skin", writer Shiban felt that the shapeshifting villain had to change into one of the lead characters. The character chosen was Dean, and the writers decided not to clear his name of attempted murder at the end of the episode. Though they at first feared that having one of the main characters be a wanted man would later ruin the show, the writers eventually felt it was "a great layer to add", opening up new potential storylines and characters. Dean's reputation is addressed again in "The Benders", and catches up to him in the second and third seasons. Another element that would influence future episodes came about in "Hook Man" when writers Milbauer and Burton realized that shotguns shoot salt, a weakness for spirits. Kripke deemed it the "perfect combination of occult element", as it brought together a "folkloric repellent of evil" with the "blue-collar aspect of shotguns". The episode "Asylum" later established iron as another weapon against ghosts. "Faith", on the other hand, stemmed from the question of whether it truly was wrong to heal good people of their illnesses at the cost of the lives of strangers. Kripke noted, "[Layla's] really a great girl and she deserves to live, and some stranger you don't even know will die... and maybe that's worth it." Reapers were not in the original script of the episode, but were added later to give the writers a chance to create "scary" sequences and to explain the faith healer's ability. Because the writers found the traditional look of the Reaper—hooded and carrying a sickle—to be cheesy, they ultimately made him appear as "the most shriveled old man you could ever imagine".

When you think about it, so many monsters are akin to natural phenomena—it's about survival and existence... but it's not as diabolical and twisted as a human being can get.

— Shiban on the human villains of "The Benders".

Although the villain of the episode "Hell House" has supernatural origins, the basis of the story came from a situation writer Trey Callaway had as a child; he and his friends created a fake murder scene in an abandoned barn and then convinced their friends that killings occurred there. The children would often go there to scare each other, with one girl running away and breaking her leg after believing that she saw an attacking ghost. The human antagonists of "The Benders", however, were completely devoid of supernatural elements. Shiban made this decision not only to surprise the audience, but also to have the Winchesters face something they had never encountered before. For "Nightmare", Tucker tried to write the character Max as sympathetic, and thus had difficulties in deciding how to end the episode. The writers eventually decided to have him kill himself to prevent him from doing more harm.

Starting off on the series, Kripke excluded vampires due to their affiliation to Buffy the Vampire Slayer. He wanted Supernatural to have its own identity, but became more comfortable with it over time. The writers intended for the vampire-episode "Dead Man's Blood" to be a self-enclosed episode, but Kripke's introduction of the Colt tied it to the final two episodes of the season. This addition pleased the writers of the penultimate episode "Salvation" because the Colt gave the brothers a way to fight Meg and also provided a reason for her to kill the Winchesters' friends. Gamble and Tucker crafted the latter storyline because they felt Kripke would only allow their inclusion if they died. When the writers could not come up with something for the Winchesters to be doing while Meg is on the loose, they split the episode into two stories; John would go after Meg while the brothers protect another family from Azazel. Tucker felt that this opened "all this emotional stuff with the guys", as well as "brought back all the themes of the show and tied the season up into a nice big bow". Similarly, Kripke believed that the revelation of John being possessed by Azazel in "Devil's Trap" had to be, as it completed the two main storylines of the season—finding their father and tracking down the demon—at the same time, but had them find both characters in one body.

=== Influences by popular culture ===
While supernatural and urban legends inspired many episodes, some storyline aspects were influenced by popular culture. The inspiration for the wendigo's appearance in "Wendigo" came from the creature featured in the music video for the Aphex Twin song "Come to Daddy". Human features were added to the design due to the wendigo's human origins, and the creature was given the ability to mimic human voices to create a "creepy effect". However, Kripke was not pleased with the final appearance of the wendigo, deeming him as "Gollum's tall, gangly cousin". Because of this, the creature is not seen throughout most of the episode. For shapeshifting scenes in the episode "Skin", Kripke chose to base the transformation on that of An American Werewolf in London, using prosthetics and makeup rather than computer-generated imagery. The Ring's Samara influenced the titular villain in "Bloody Mary", though Kripke felt that she ended up looking too similar to the character due to her grisly appearance and the use of speed ramping to create a time-manipulation effect. Visual effects supervisor Ivan Hayden, on the other hand, believes it was more of an homage.

=== Filming ===
Though the pilot was shot in Los Angeles, principal filming for the rest of the season took place in Vancouver, British Columbia. Local sites often served as shooting locations, with much of "Dead in the Water" taking place at Buntzen Lake and the climax of "Wendigo" occurring in a Britannia Beach mine. Likewise, Riverview Hospital functioned as a mental institution in "Asylum". Though production has sometimes recycled sets from other television series—"The Benders" made use of a previously built Western town, while the warehouse-loft set of "Shadow" originated from the series Tru Calling—most episodes usually require the construction of new sets due to the constant change of setting. The production team, however, created reusable standing sets in the form of the motel rooms frequented by the Winchesters. Each episode presents a different theme to disguise the motel-room set's repeated use, with different colors, bedspreads, and curtains being used. The episode "Provenance", for instance, displayed a disco-themed motel room.

=== Music ===
The mostly synthesized orchestral score of the season was composed by Christopher Lennertz and Jay Gruska. The pair try to base the music on the visuals of each episode, with about a third of each episode's score being newly written for the supernatural legend. For example, off-angle shots in "Dead in the Water" are accompanied by repetitive and discordant notes. As well, spoken words such as "water" and "die" are followed by a lower pitch because Lennertz felt it created a "gurgly" water sound. An electric cello and woodwinds helped to create a big emotional tone in the episode "Home", with Lennertz feeling that the final cue "became a very cinematic musical moment". To fit in with the episode's ambiance in "Asylum", Gruska made the music very subtle; Lennertz felt that it was "creepy-crawly" like "a snake sneaking along the ground". Conversely, Lennertz matched the theme of traveling evangelists in "Faith" by using a small 76-key piano that was damaged and slightly out of tune. He attached small items such as coins and paper clips to the keys to create a rattling noise, making the piano seem "old and crappy". Lennertz then played "bluesy gospel music" during the sermon scenes involving the Reapers. Because he felt that there was also a "snake-oil salesman vibe" to the episode, he included an Armenian duduk due to its association with snake charming. The score of "Hell House", on the other hand, had a much lighter tone to coincide with the episode's humor. For example, music for the scenes involving the "professional" ghost hunters used percussion instruments to slightly mimic the Mission: Impossible theme.

When it's with the boys, we're melodic. But when it's scary, we're full-on Elliot Goldenthal! It's that the mentality let's [us] really beat people up a little bit and really make it scary. It gives you a yin-yang kind of thing.

— Lennertz on the contrasting music of the series.

However, recurring characters often have certain musical themes attached to them. For the pilot episode, Lennertz used a piano solo with discordant notes and reverberations to create a "really nasty"-sounding echo effect for the scenes involving Mary and Jessica's deaths at the hands of the demon Azazel. Lennertz returns to this in "Nightmare", including it when Sam realizes the connection he shares with the demon and Max. The episode "Dead in the Water" was the first to use what Kripke feels is the "Winchester emotion", which involves sorrowful and reverberating piano notes on top of strings. It plays when the brothers make connections with other characters. As well, there are variants of a guitar line used as the "humorous brothers' theme" in many episodes, including "Pilot" and "Hell House", when the brothers are having fun. With Gruska writing Meg Masters' theme for "Scarecrow", Lennertz reused the music in "Shadow" but "took the scary up a notch" to imply to the viewers that she is both "more important and more devilish" than the other creatures in the episode. For the penultimate episode "Salvation", Lennertz incorporated musical elements used throughout the season.

In addition to the score, the series makes use of rock songs, with most being selected from Kripke's private collection. Among the many bands featured in the first season are AC/DC, Blue Öyster Cult, Creedence Clearwater Revival, Lynyrd Skynyrd, and Bad Company. Rock songs are also usually featured in "The Road So Far" montages at the beginning of select episodes that recap previous events. This was first done with the episode "Salvation", in which the entire season was recapped to Kansas' "Carry On Wayward Son", with the subsequent episode—the season finale—using Triumph's "Fight the Good Fight".

=== Effects ===
While it was intended for the vengeful spirit's attack to be done with physical special effects in "Dead in the Water", CGI was found to be more practical.

To depict the supernatural aspects of the show, the series makes use of visual, special, and make-up effects, as well as stuntwork. While various companies were contracted for the Los Angeles-based production of the pilot episode, subsequent episodes being filmed in Vancouver required a new crew to be hired. The company Entity FX performed the visual effects for the pilot episode, with Ivan Hayden taking over as visual effects supervisor for the rest of the season. The crew was required to design all of the external airplane shots in "Phantom Traveler" from scratch using computer-generated imagery (CGI). As well, they created a time-manipulation effect for the titular villain in "Bloody Mary" by altering the capture frame rate of the camera. Randy Shymkiw acted as special effects supervisor, and the department found the episode "Asylum" to be quite a challenge because one scene has the vengeful spirit collapse into dust. They made casts of the character's torso and hands, and had to find the perfect mixture in order to have the casts remain solid but disintegrate when needed.

The visual and special effects departments often overlap, such as in Mary Winchester's death scene in the pilot episode. Because the character is pinned to the ceiling and burned to death, actress Samantha Smith was required to lie on a floor with two propane pipes spouting fire approximately five feet away from her on either side. For the actual burning of the character, a papier-mâché body was ignited on a fake ceiling. When the burning of the titular creature in the episode "Wendigo" was not sufficient using special effects, a wire-frame mannequin wrapped in steel wool was then burned, with the scene being composited into the original footage to draw out the wendigo's death. To make it appear that the Hook Man is invisible as he scrapes his hook along the wall for one of the scenes in "Hook Man", a wire was placed inside plaster walls and then pulled out; the wire later was digitally removed in post-production. In the episode "Bugs", the cast had to be sealed in a small area with hundreds of bees, and were stung despite wearing special costumes with cuffs sewn into their sleeves and pants. However, the bees did not show up well on camera, so most of them that appear in the final version were added with CGI.

In addition to the digital effects, the series also features stuntwork. Lou Bollo took over as stunt coordinator after the pilot episode, and big scenes often involved the actors, though stunt doubles were used for certain moments. For the final lake scene in "Dead in the Water", in which Dean must save a boy after he is pulled underwater by a vengeful spirit, Jensen Ackles had to hold onto the young actor as they were pulled down ten feet into the water by divers. The actor portraying the vengeful spirit had to wear a wetsuit under his costume due to the extended period of time he was required to spend in the lake. Ackles and Jared Padalecki performed most of the fight scene featured in "Skin", and only took four hours to learn the fight choreography. However, stunt doubles were brought in for the scenes in which they are thrown into bookshelves and through a coffee table. For the episode "Shadow", rather than filming at the exterior location for the scene of Meg Masters being thrown out of a window to the street below, it was decided to not depict the impact, instead having the Winchesters look down at her body after the landing. Thus, filming of it was allowed to take place in the studio using a body double.

Throughout filming, various scenes make use of all three effects departments. For scenes involving the floating, fiery spirit of Mary Winchester in "Home", a small and slim stuntman wearing a fire suit was lit on fire and raised into the air on wires. For the spirit's transition into Mary's normal form, Smith stood in front of a black background with wind blowing onto her, and the two scenes were later combined in post-production. Many aspects went into filming the crash scene in the season finale "Devil's Trap". For the interior scenes used in the first moments of the Impala being hit, Jeffrey Dean Morgan, Padalecki, and Ackles were required to sit in the car, which was in front of a blue screen. A sheet of Lexan placed very close to the passenger-side window protected the actors as the window was shattered, and at the same time, cannons beneath the frame blew out pieces of rubber glass to give the appearance that the window exploded onto them. For scenes of the actual crash, the car and truck were cabled together by a winch, and driven toward one another. The intention was for a cannon to launch the Impala into the air at the collision point, causing the car to then barrel roll as the truck drives away. However, the car became stuck in the truck's bumper, forcing the cannon to fail and the truck to go out of control. The truck began to jackknife, but the stuntman driving it saved it from flipping. The mistake ended up being beneficial for the scene, as Kripke and director Manners found it to look "pretty real".

== Reception ==
After the first four episodes of Supernatural aired in 2005, the WB decided to pick up the series for a full season of 22 episodes. During those first episodes, the series was ranked third in males aged 18–34 and 12–34. It also posted an increase of 73% in males aged 18–49 from the year before, although it only gained 4% in total viewers, and retained 91% of viewers from its lead-in, Gilmore Girls. Supernatural's first season averaged about 3.81 million American viewers. According to Special Forces Soldier Master Sergeant Kevin Wise at a 2007 Supernatural convention, the DVDs most requested by armed forces personnel in Iraq and Afghanistan were the first two seasons of the series.

The review aggregator website Rotten Tomatoes reported an 87% approval rating with an average rating of 7.3/10 based on 31 reviews. The website's consensus reads, "Despite some too-hip dialogue and familiar thematic elements, Supernatural's vigilante brothers manage to stir up some legitimate scares." On Metacritic, the season scored 59 out of 100 based on 22 reviews, indicating "mixed or average" reviews.

Tanner Stransky of Entertainment Weekly gave the first season a B, saying the show "comes off as weekly installments of a horror movie series", but that "Adding to the show's cred are the '67 Chevy Impala the boys rumble around in and their kick-ass soundtrack". Tom Gliatto of People Weekly ranked the show at number five on his list of the Best TV Shows of 2005. Peter Schorn of IGN gave the season a score of 7 out of 10. While he found the self-enclosed episodes to be "passably entertaining", he enjoyed the story arcs introduced later in the season. Schorn also deemed the "stormy relationship between Sam and his father" to be "compelling", and noted that the lead stars have "good chemistry together". Rick Porter of Zap2it felt that while the season had its "share of emotional moments", it also "[scared] the pants off" of viewers "surprisingly well". He also believed that it did a good job at balancing mythology episodes with self-enclosed ones, comparing it to the early seasons of The X-Files. However, Eric Neigher of Slant Magazine highly criticized the self-enclosed episodes for being "almost totally linear, without any B- or C-stories", and felt that the episodes were mainly "watered-down rehashes of classic weird fiction or popular urban legends".

Work on the pilot episode garnered two Primetime Emmy Awards nominations in 2006, composer Christopher Lennertz being nominated in the category of "Outstanding Music Composition For A Series (Dramatic Underscore)" and the sound editors receiving a nomination for "Outstanding Sound Editing for a Series". The pilot episode also brought in a nomination for a Golden Reel Award in the category of "Best Sound Editing in Television: Short Form – Sound Effects and Foley", with work on the episode "Salvation" gaining the same nomination in 2007. Additionally, the season was nominated for a Saturn Award in the category of "Best Network Television Series". For the Teen Choice Awards, the series was nominated for "TV – Choice Breakout Show" and Jensen Ackles for "TV – Choice Breakout Star".

== Home media release ==
The first season of Supernatural was released as a six-disc Region 1 DVD box set on September 5, 2006, three weeks before the premiere of the second season. The cover art incorporated a stylized shot of the Winchester brothers in front of their car. Including all 22 episodes of the first season, the set also featured DVD extras such as episode commentaries, deleted scenes, bloopers, featurettes, and a DVD-ROM sneak-peek at the second season. The season was ranked No. 14 in DVD sales for its week of release, and slipped to No. 28 the following week, with cumulative sales during those two weeks coming to 150,376 sets for $5,264,942. The set was later packaged with the first season of Smallville as a "Season One Starter Pack", which was released on September 18, 2007. For Region 2, the season was split into two parts, being released on May 22, 2006, and August 21, 2006; the complete set was released on October 2, 2006. The season was also released in Region 4 on September 6, 2006, though the special features were removed. A "Special Collector's Edition" was later released on October 2, 2007, with the extras restored. The first season was released on Region A Blu-ray Disc on June 15, 2010, including new special features–"The Devil's Road Map", an interactive guide featuring interviews about every episode and a Paley Festival panel discussion featuring the cast and crew.
