= Shtriga =

Albanian mythical figure

A shtriga (Albanian: shtrigë) is a vampiric witch in Albanian mythology and folklore that sucks the blood of infants at night while they sleep, and then transform themselves into a flying insect (traditionally a moth, fly or bee). Only the shtriga herself could cure those she had drained. The shtriga is often pictured as a woman with a hateful stare (sometimes wearing a cape) and a horribly disfigured face. They usually live in hidden places in the forest and have supernatural powers. The term shtriga is used also with the common meaning of "witch", referring to a bad and ugly old woman who casts evil spells upon people. The male noun for shtriga is shtrigu or shtrigan.

== Etymology ==
The Albanian word shtrigë (definite form being shtriga) derives from the Latin strīga, "evil spirit, witch", related to Italian: strega, Romanian: strigă and Polish: strzyga.

== Legend ==
According to legend, only the shtriga herself could cure those she had drained (often by spitting in their mouths), and those who were not cured inevitably sickened and died.

The name can be used to express that a person is evil. According to Northern Albanian folklore, a woman is not born a witch; she becomes one, often because she is childless or made evil by envy. A strong belief in God could make people immune to a witch as He would protect them.

Usually, shtriga were described as old or middle-aged women with grey, pale green, or pale blue eyes (called white eyes or pale eyes) (Albanian: sybardha) and a crooked nose. Their stare would make people uncomfortable, and people were supposed to avoid looking them directly in the eyes because they have the evil eye (Albanian: syliga). To ward off a witch, people could take a pinch of salt in their fingers and touch their (closed) eyes, mouth, heart and the opposite part of the heart and the pit of the stomach and then throw the salt in direct flames saying "syt i dalçin syt i plaçin" or just whisper 3–6 times "syt i dalçin syt i plaçin" or "plast syri keq."

In some regions of Albania, people have used garlic (Albanian: hudhër); to send away the evil eye or they have placed a puppet in a house being built to catch the evil. Newborns, children or beautiful girls have been said to catch the evil eye more easily, so in some Albanian regions when meeting such a person, especially a newborn, for the first time, people might say "t’rujt Zoti" meaning may God keep you safe and touch the child's nose to show their benevolence and so that the evil eye would not catch the child.

Edith Durham recorded several methods traditionally considered effective for defending oneself from shtriga. A cross made of pig bone could be placed at the entrance of a church on Easter Sunday, rendering any shtriga inside unable to leave. They could then be captured and killed at the threshold as they vainly attempted to pass. She further recorded the story that after draining blood from a victim, the shtriga would generally go off into the woods and regurgitate it. If a silver coin were to be soaked in that blood and wrapped in cloth, it would become an amulet offering permanent protection from any shtriga.

In Catholic legend, it is said that shtriga can be destroyed using holy water with a cross in it, and in Islamic myth it is said that shtriga can be sent away or killed by reciting verses from the Qur'an, specifically Ayatul Kursi 255 sura Al-Baqara, and spitting water on the shtriga.

== In popular culture ==
In an Albanian tale published by Post Wheeler with the title The Girl who took a Snake for a Husband, the Shtriga appears as "the grandmother of all witches" that lives in the Underworld, a place of a red sun, a green sky and black trees.

A shtriga was featured in the Supernatural episode, "Something Wicked", wherein it attacked children, causing them to become comatose; it then disguised itself as a doctor so it could continue to feed upon them. Dean manages to kill the monster by shooting it in the head with consecrated iron bullets while it was feeding on Sam. All the children it attacked return to normal.

A shtriga was featured in the Lost Girl episode "Follow the Yellow Trick Road." Bo's friends search for the creature after figuring out that the shtriga had bitten Bo in its moth form, leaving her comatose and dying as it feeds on her fears.

The Shtriga appears in the Legends of Tomorrow episode "Wet Hot American Bummer." This version attacks the children at a summer camp and poses as a camp counselor.

Resident Evil 8 features the daughters of Lady Dimitrescu who, much like the Strigas, are vampires that can shapeshift into insects.

== See also ==
- Albanian folk beliefs
- Chonchon
- Soucouyant
- Strigoi
- Stirge

== Sources ==
=== Bibliography ===
- Elsie, Robert (2001). A dictionary of Albanian religion, mythology and folk culture. NYU Press. p. 236. ISBN 978-1-85065-570-1.
- Orel, Vladimir (1998). Albanian etymological dictionary. Brill. ISBN 90-04-11024-0.
- Tirta, Mark (2004). Petrit Bezhani (ed.). Mitologjia ndër shqiptarë (in Albanian). Tirana: Mësonjëtorja. ISBN 99927-938-9-9.
