= Lesser of two evils principle =

Guiding principle for a moral dilemma

The lesser of two evils principle, also referred to as the lesser evil principle and lesser-evilism, is the ethical principle that, when faced with selecting from two immoral options, the less immoral one should be chosen. The principle is most often invoked in reference to lesser evil voting, a binary political choice under systems that make it impossible to express a sincere preference for one's favorite.

== Origin ==
The maxim existed already in Platonic philosophy. In Nicomachean Ethics, Aristotle writes: "For the lesser evil can be seen in comparison with the greater evil as a good, since this lesser evil is preferable to the greater one, and whatever preferable is good". The modern formulation was popularized by Thomas à Kempis' devotional book The Imitation of Christ written in early 15th century.

In part IV of his Ethics, Spinoza states the following maxim:

Proposition 65: "According to the guidance of reason, of two things which are good, we shall follow the greater good, and of two evils, follow the less."

== In modern elections ==
The concept of "lesser evil" voting (LEV) can be seen as a form of the minimax strategy ("minimize maximum loss") where voters, when faced with two or more candidates, choose the one they perceive as the most likely to do harm and vote for the one most likely to defeat him, or the "lesser evil." To do so, "voting should not be viewed as a form of personal self-expression or moral judgement directed in retaliation towards major party candidates who fail to reflect our values, or of a corrupt system designed to limit choices to those acceptable to corporate elites" rather as an opportunity to reduce harm or loss.

Hannah Arendt argued that "Those who choose the lesser evil forget very quickly that they chose evil". In contrast Seyla Benhabib argues that politics would not exist without the necessity to choose between a greater and a lesser evil. When limited to the two most likely candidates, "lesser evil" is the most likely "greater good", for the "common good", as Pope Francis has said.

In 2012, Huffington Post columnist Sanford Jay Rosen stated that refusal to vote for the lesser of two evils became common practice for left-leaning voters in the United States due to their overwhelming disapproval of the United States government's support for the Vietnam War. Rosen stated: "Beginning with the 1968 presidential election, I often have heard from liberals that they could not vote for the lesser of two evils. Some said they would not vote; some said they would vote for a third-party candidate. That mantra delivered us to Richard Nixon in 1972 until Watergate did him in. And it delivered us to George W. Bush and Dick Cheney in 2000 until they were termed out in 2009".

In the 2016 United States presidential election, both major candidates of the major parties — Hillary Clinton (D) and Donald Trump (R) — had disapproval ratings close to 60% by August 2016. Green Party candidate Jill Stein invoked this idea in her campaign stating, "Don't vote for the lesser evil, fight for the greater good". Green Party votes hurt Democratic chances in 2000 and 2016. This sentiment was repeated for the next two election cycles, both of which were between Trump and Democratic candidates Joe Biden in 2020 and Kamala Harris in 2024. Accordingly, the lesser evil principle should be applied to two front-runners among many choices, after eliminating from consideration "minor party candidates (who) can be spoilers in elections by taking away enough votes from a major party candidate to influence the outcome without winning."

In his DarkHorse podcast, Bret Weinstein describes his Unity 2020 proposal for the 2020 presidential election as an option that, in case of failure, would not asymmetrically weaken voters' second-best choice on a single political side, thereby avoiding the lesser evil paradox.

In elections between only two candidates where one is mildly unpopular and the other immensely unpopular, opponents of both candidates frequently advocate a vote for the mildly unpopular candidate. For example, in the second round of the 2002 French presidential election graffiti in Paris told people to "vote for the crook, not the fascist". The "crook" in those scribbled public messages was Jacques Chirac of Rally for the Republic and the "fascist" was Jean-Marie Le Pen of the National Front. Chirac eventually won the second round having garnered 82% of the vote.

== Mythology ==
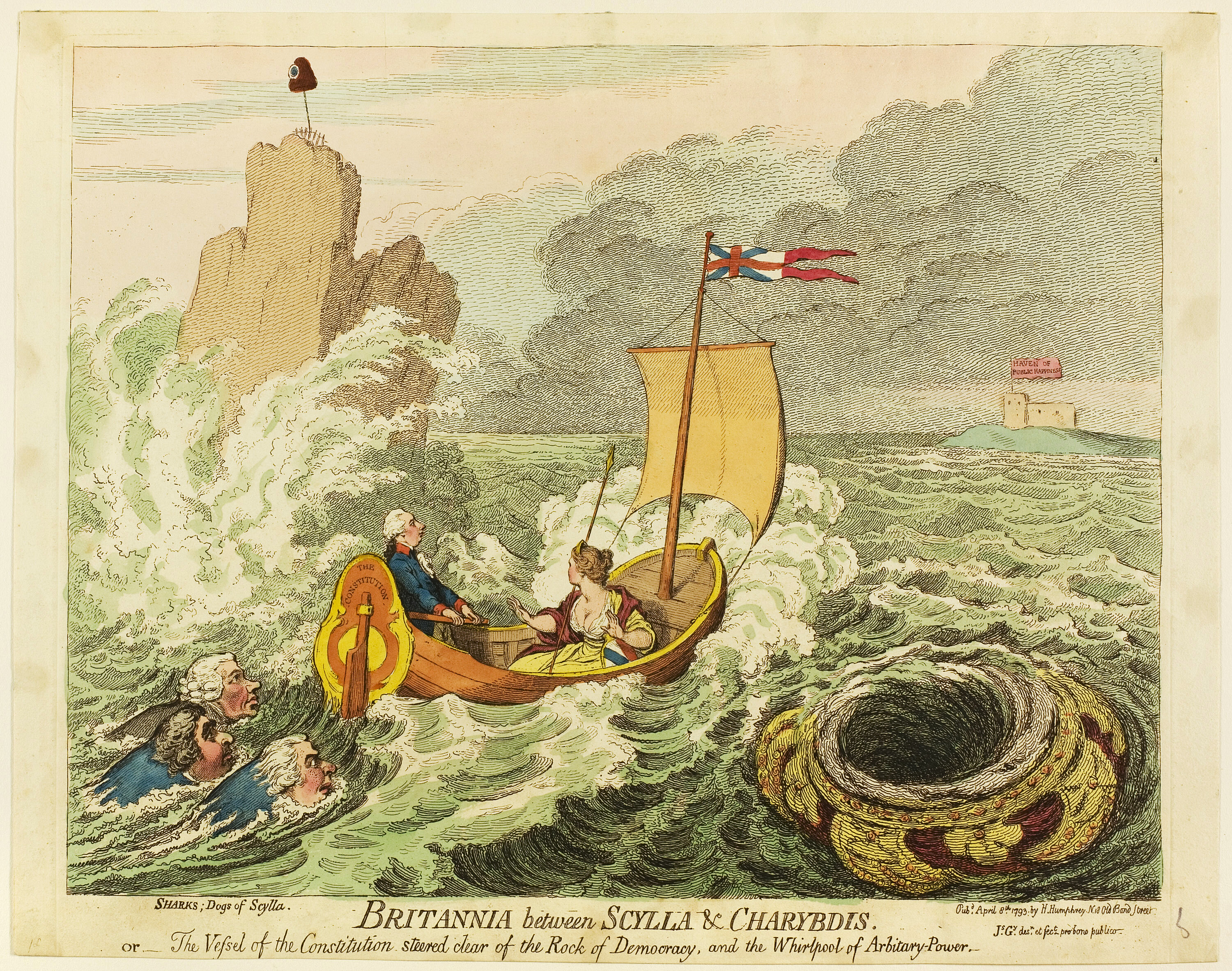
James Gillray, Britannia between Scylla and Charybdis (1793)

"Between Scylla and Charybdis" is an idiom derived from Homer's Odyssey. In the story, Odysseus chose to go near Scylla as the lesser of two evils. He lost six of his companions, but if he had gone near Charybdis all would be doomed. Because of such stories, having to navigate between the two hazards eventually entered idiomatic use.

An equivalent English seafaring phrase is "Between a rock and a hard place". The Latin line incidit in scyllam cupiens vitare charybdim ("he runs into Scylla, wishing to avoid Charybdis") had earlier become proverbial, with a meaning much the same as jumping from the frying pan into the fire. Erasmus recorded it as an ancient proverb in his Adagia, although the earliest known instance is in the Alexandreis, a 12th-century Latin epic poem by Walter of Châtillon.

== See also ==
- Median voter theorem
- Myerson–Weber strategy
- Trolley problem
- Two-party system
