= Scilla, Calabria =

Town in Italy

Scilla U Scigghiu (Sicilian), Greek: Skýlla
- Comune
- Comune di Scilla
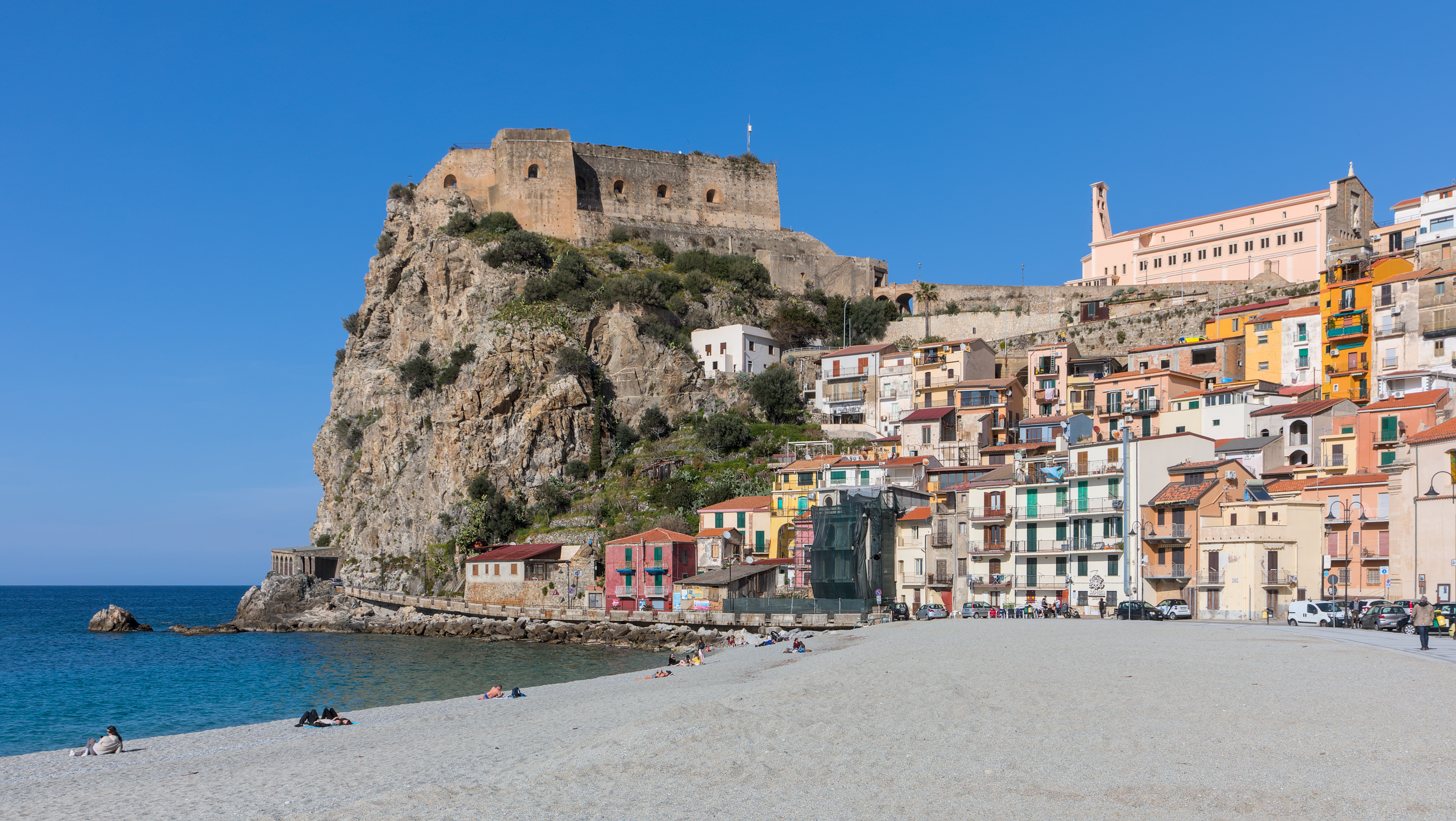
- The castle (left) and the church of Maria Santissima Immacolata, seen from the beach

- Coat of arms

- Location within Italy Location within Calabria
- Coordinates: 38.25067°N 15.71899°E
- Country: Italy
- Region: Calabria
- Metropolitan city: Reggio Calabria (RC)
- Frazioni: Favazzina, Melia, Solano Superiore

Government
  - Mayor: Gaetano Ciccone

Area
  - Total: 44.13 km^{2} (17.04 sq mi)
- Elevation: 91 m (299 ft)

Population (1 January 2017)
  - Total: 4,901
  - Density: 111.1/km^{2} (287.6/sq mi)
- Demonym: Scillesi
- Time zone: UTC+1 (CET)
  - Summer (DST): UTC+2 (CEST)
- Postal code: 89058
- Dialing code: 0965
- Patron saint: St. Roch
- Saint day: 16 August
- Website: Official website

Scilla (Calabrian: U Scigghiu; Greek: Σκύλλα, romanized: Skýlla) is a town and comune in Calabria, Italy, administratively part of the Metropolitan City of Reggio Calabria. It is the traditional site of the sea monster Scylla of Greek mythology.

== Description ==
The town, 22 kilometres (14 mi) from the city of Reggio, lies at the northern end of the strait of Messina, and is composed of two parts: the downtown, where the town offices and the residence of the patron saint are situated, and Marina di Scilla, the beach-front, populated by tourists and thus heavily characterized by hotels and restaurants. Its beach is the first place north of Reggio Calabria where the waters are not cooled by the strait currents.

Scilla's coastal district of Chianalea is included in the I Borghi più belli d'Italia association of small Italian towns of historical interest list.

The Ruffo Castle, a fortress built by the Dukes of Calabria, overlooks the beach. On a seaward-facing terrace is Scilla Lighthouse, an important aid to ships entering the Strait of Messina from the north.

== History ==
It is said that Tyrrhenian pirates were the first to settle this coastal area in 493 BC, but others claim it was already settled during the time of the Trojan War in the 12th century BC.

The town of Scilla has ancient origins that relate mainly to the period of the destruction of Troy and invokes the myths and legends of Odysseus with Scylla and Charybdis, of Homer and Dante Alighieri. Its name derives from the mythological figure of Scylla, a young nymph who refused Glaucus' love. He thus went to the sorceress Circe, who was in love with him, and asked her to help him win Scylla's heart. The offended sorceress poisoned the sea-pool where the nymph used to bathe, turning her into a horrific six dog-headed monster who destroyed every ship crossing the Strait of Messina. Scylla is said to live in the rock of Scilla, which the Castello di Ruffo sits on.

In 1806, during the British expedition to Sicily to oppose the French invasion of Naples, the Castle of Scilla was twice besieged.

== Geography ==
The municipality of Scilla includes the subdivisions Favazzina, Melia, and Solano Superiore.

Scilla borders the municipalities of Bagnara Calabra and Villa San Giovanni.

Scilla lies across the Strait of Messina from Sicily, which is observable from the town. When visibility is clear, the island of Stromboli can also be seen.

== Twin towns ==
Scilla has been twinned with the following:

- Hamrun, Malta

== In popular culture ==
Scilla is one of two primary settings in Elizabeth Street, a 2009 historical novel by Laurie Fabiano that tells of the experiences of a family who emigrates from Scilla to New York City's Little Italy neighborhood in the early 20th century. Based on the author's family history, it includes a detailed description of the 1908 earthquake and tsunami.

== Transport ==
The town is served by a station on the Salerno-Reggio Calabria railway.

Main roads include the A2 Salerno-Reggio motorway and the Strada statale 18 Tirrena Inferiore.

== Gallery ==
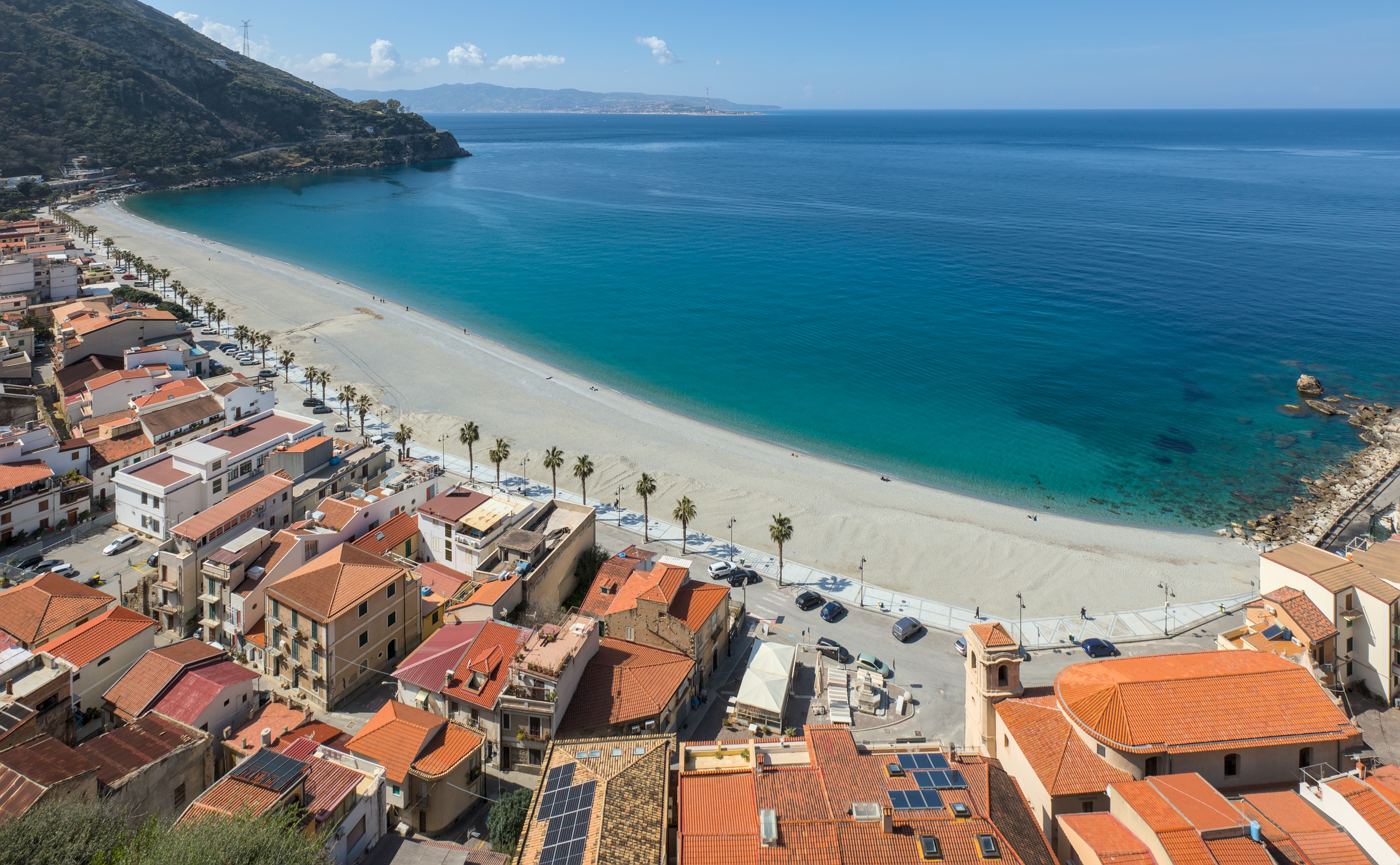
The Marina Grande

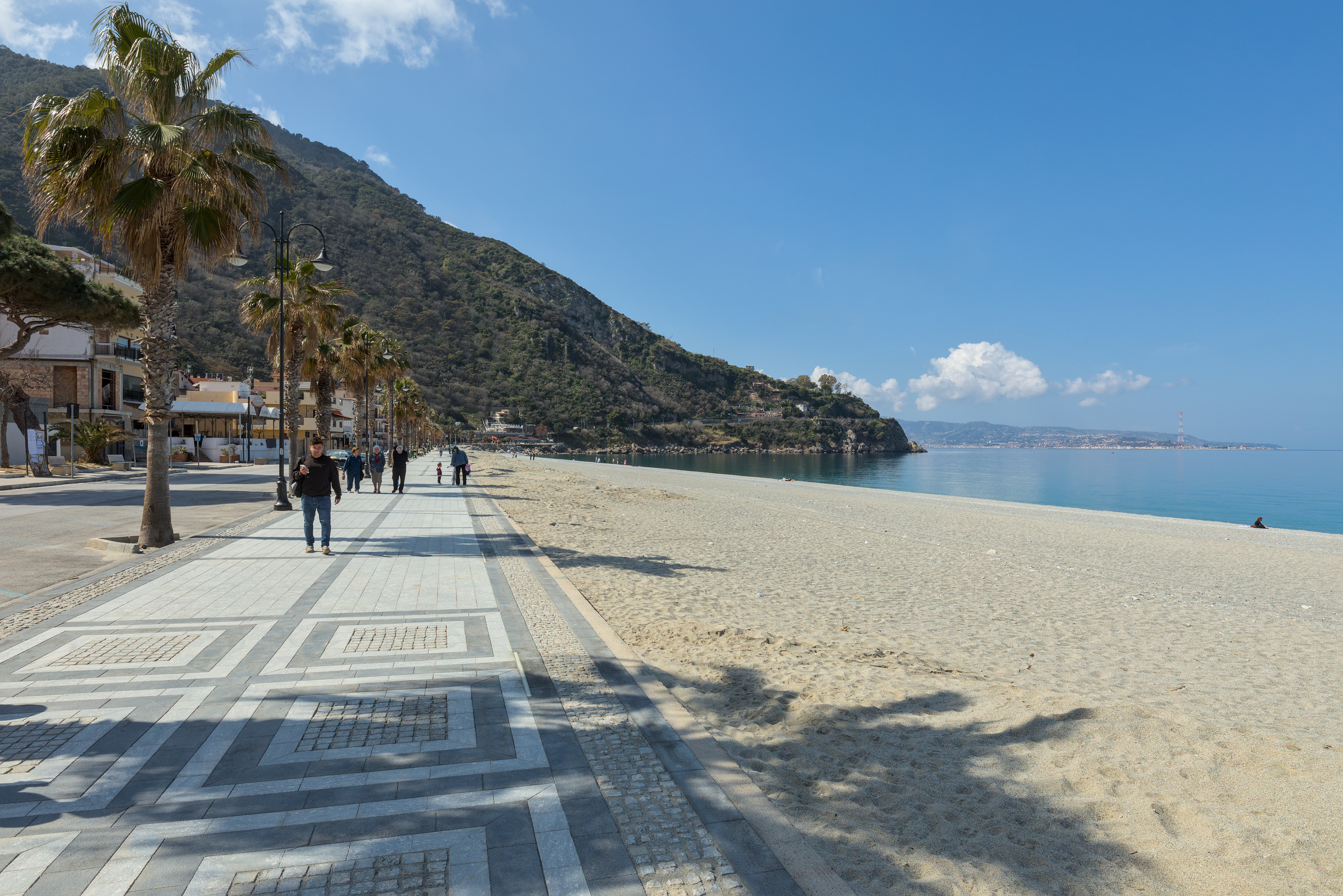
Marina Grande beach

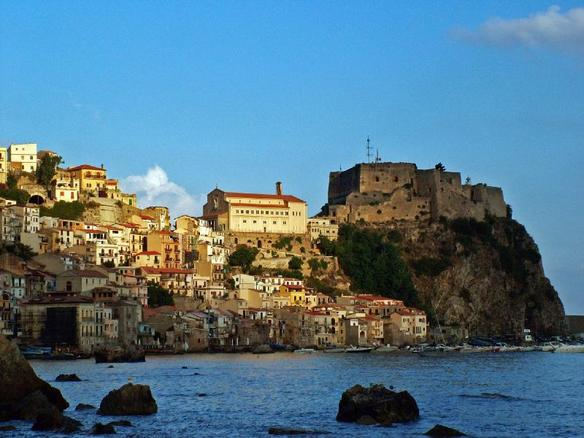
Chianalea and the Castle

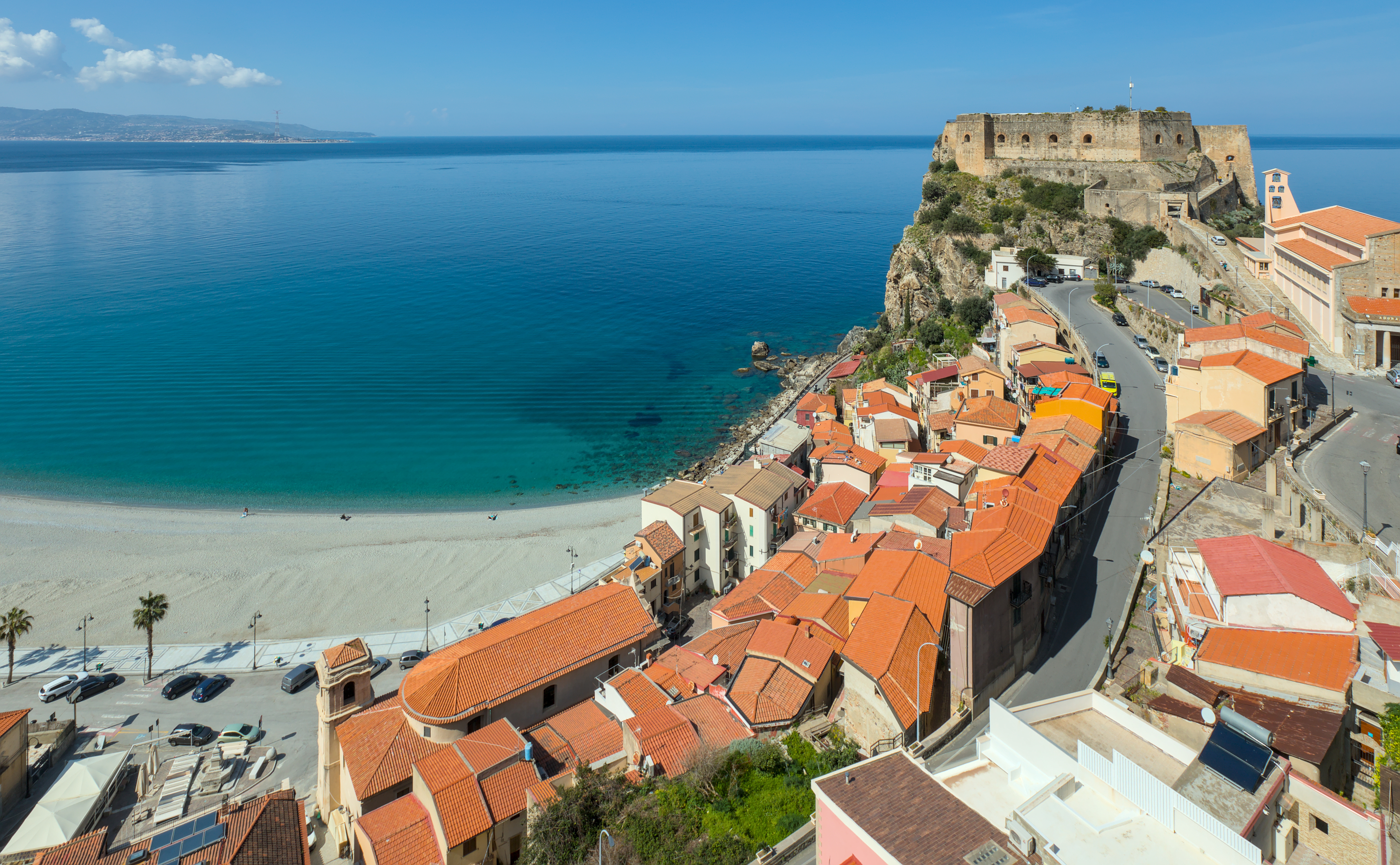
Scilla and the Ruffo Castle

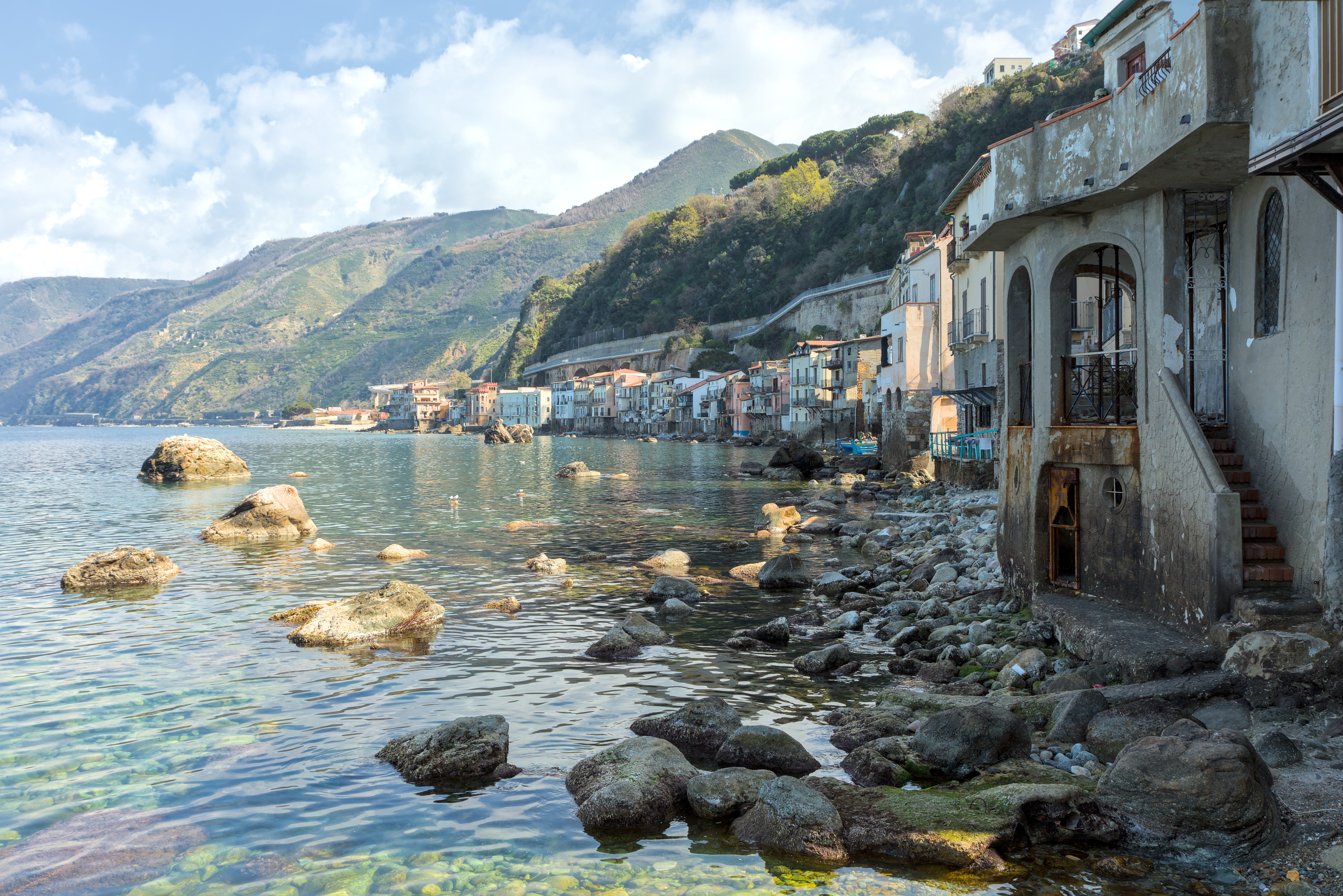
Houses on the water in Chianalea

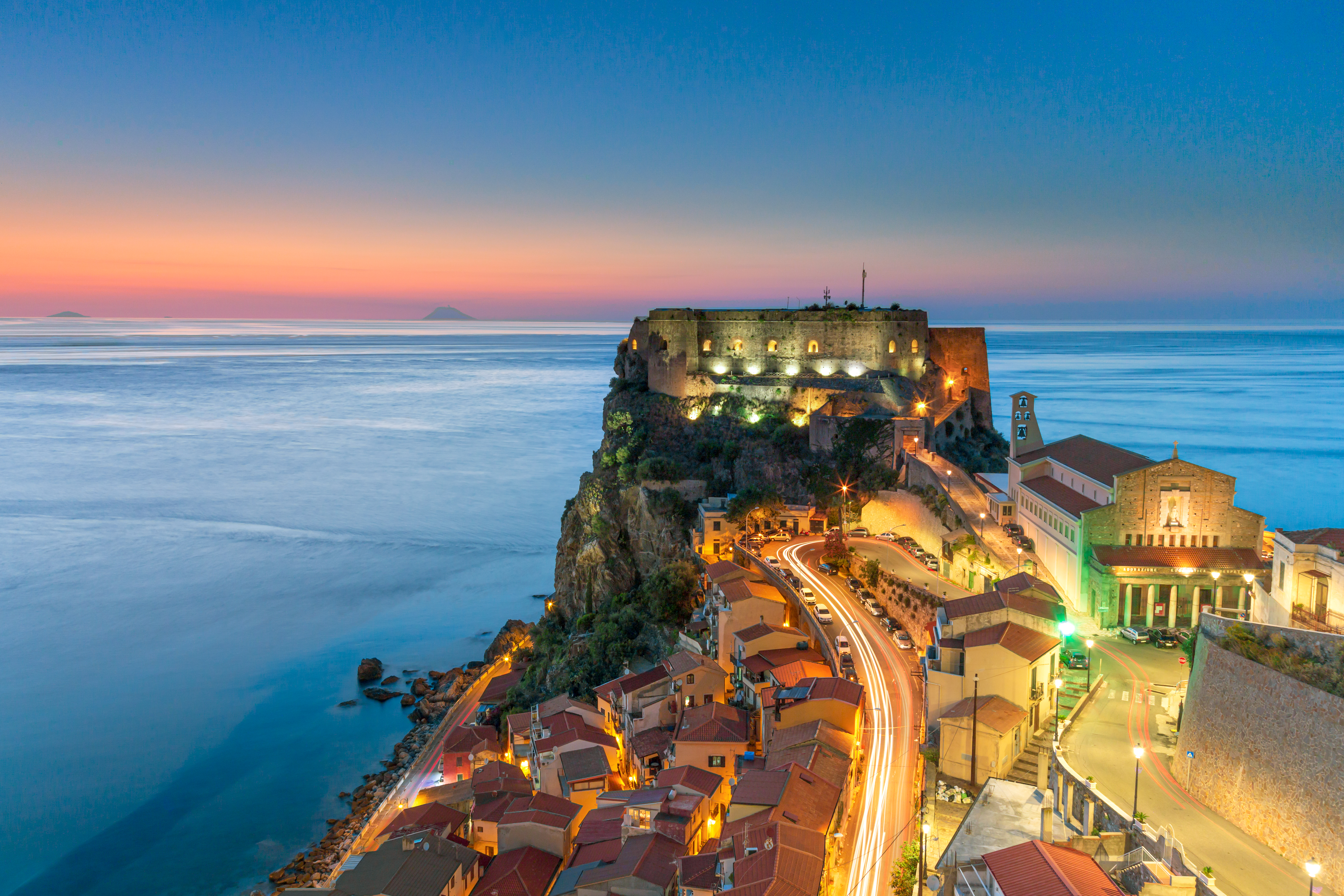
The castle at dusk, with Stromboli visible

== See also ==
- Scilla Lighthouse
- Scyllaeum
- Calabrian wine
