= Scyllaeum =

Scyllaeum or Scylaeum (Greek: τὸ Σκύλλαιον or Σκύλαιον) was a promontory, and ancient town or fortress, on the west coast of Bruttium (modern Calabria), about 25 km north of Rhegium (Reggio di Calabria), and almost exactly at the entrance of the Sicilian strait.

The promontory is well described by Strabo as a projecting rocky headland, jutting out boldly into the sea, and united to the mainland by a narrow neck or isthmus, so as to form two small but well sheltered bays, one on each side. There can be no doubt that this rocky promontory was the one which became the subject of so many fables, and which was represented by Homer and other poets as the abode of the monster Scylla. But the dangers of the rock of Scylla were far more fabulous than those of its neighbor Charybdis, and it is difficult to understand how, even in the infancy of navigation, it could have offered any obstacle more formidable than a hundred other headlands whose names are unknown to fame.

Procopius writes that Scylaeum was said by poets to be where Scylla once lived, not because there really existed there a woman in the form of a beast, but rather because a certain fish, formerly called "scylax" and later renamed "cyniscus", has been found in great abundance in this part of the strait from ancient times even down to his time. He then explains that names in the beginning are always appropriate to the things they describe, but rumour, carrying these names to other peoples, produces false opinions through ignorance of the facts. As time goes on, this process becomes a builder of stories and joins with poets as witnesses of things that never happened, because of the licence of their art. He then gives examples of other similar stories from other places, such as those about dog-headed and wolf-headed people.

At a later period Anaxilas, the despot of Rhegium, being struck with the natural strength of the position, fortified the rock, and established a naval station there, for the purpose of checking the incursions of the Tyrrhenian pirates. In consequence of this a small town grew up on the spot; and hence Pliny speaks of an oppidum Scyllaeum; but it was probably always a small place, and other writers speak only of the promontory. At the present day the rock is still occupied by a fort, which is a post of considerable strength, while a small town (modern Scilla) stretches down the slopes towards the two bays. The distance from the castle to the opposite point of the Sicilian coast, marked by the Torre del Faro, is stated by William Henry Smyth at 6047 yards (c. 5.5 km), or rather less than 3.5 English miles, but the strait afterwards contracts considerably, so that its width between the Punta Pezzo and the nearest point of Sicily does not exceed 3971 yards (c. 3.6 km).
