= Marina Grande =

Marina Grande may refer to:

- Marina Grande, Capri
- Marina Grande, Scilla

== See also ==
- Marinha Grande, municipality in Leiria, Portugal
