= Crataeis =

Greek mythological figure

In Greek mythology, Crataeis (Κραταιίς, -ίδος, alt. Crataiis) is, by some accounts, the mother of Scylla. In Homer's Odyssey, Circe tells Odysseus:

"Nay, row past with all thy might, and call upon Crataiis, the mother of Scylla, who bore her for a bane to mortals. Then will she keep her from darting forth again." (Translation by A. T. Murray)

Several authors, Ovid, Apollodorus, Servius and scholia on Plato, follow Homer in assigning Crataeis as the mother of Scylla. Neither Homer nor Ovid mention a father for Scylla, but Apollodorus says that the father was either Trienus (Triton?) or Phorcus (a variant of Phorkys), similarly the Plato scholiast, perhaps following Apollodorus, gives the father as Tyrrhenus or Phorcus, while Eustathius gives the father as Triton.

Other authors have Hecate as Scylla's mother. The Hesiodic Megalai Ehoiai gives Hecate and Phorbas as the parents of Scylla, while Acusilaus says that Scylla's parents were Hecate and Phorkys (so also schol. Odyssey 12.85). Perhaps trying to reconcile these conflicting accounts, Apollonius of Rhodes says that Crataeis was another name for Hecate, and that she and Phorcys were the parents of Scylla. Likewise, Semos of Delos (FGrHist 396 F 22) says that Crataeis was the daughter of Hecate and Triton, and mother of Scylla by Deimos. Stesichorus (alone) names Lamia as the mother of Scylla, possibly the Lamia who was the daughter of Poseidon, while according to Hyginus, Scylla was the offspring of Typhon and Echidna.
