= Scilla Lighthouse =

Scilla sul Castello
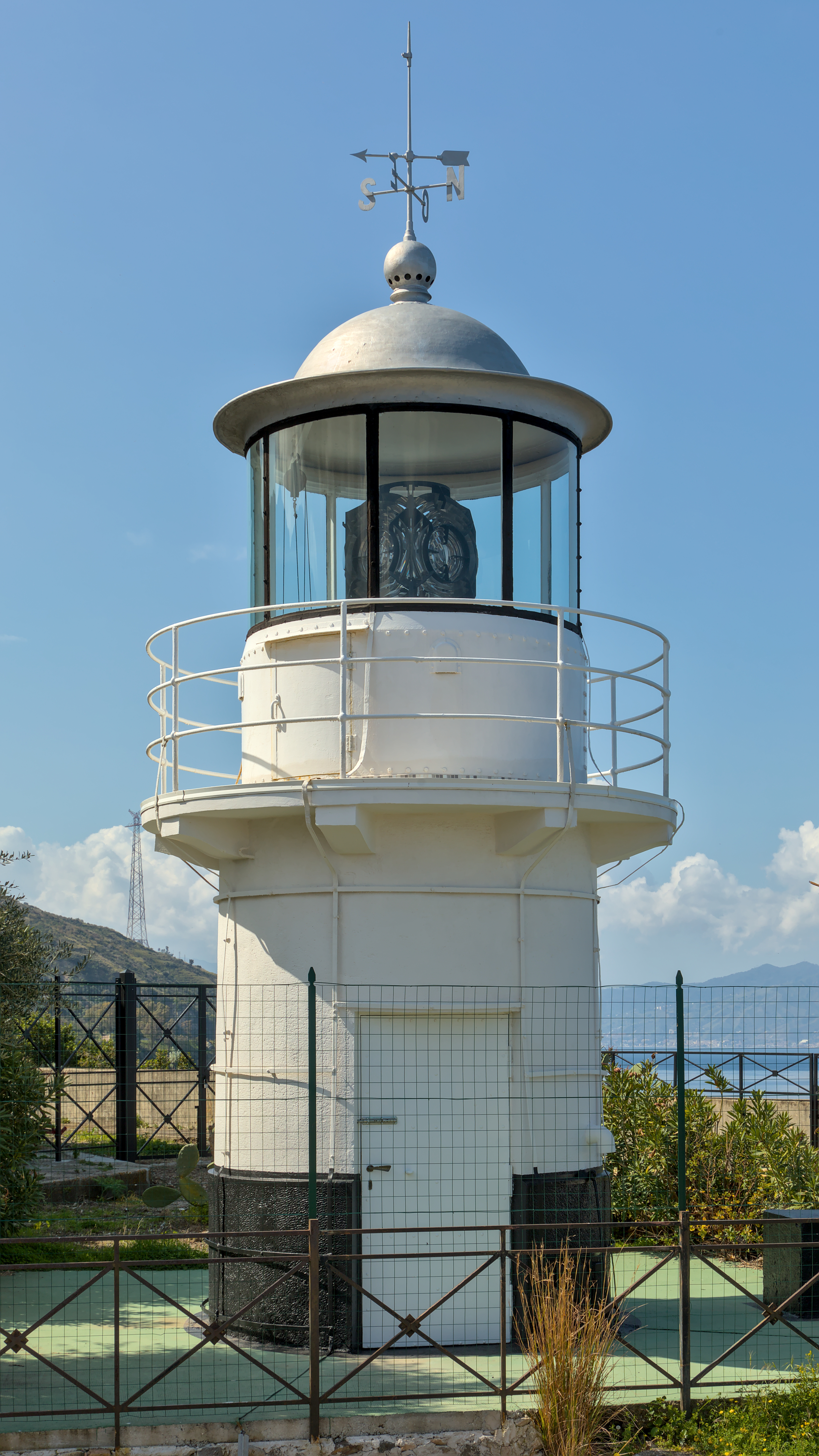
- Scilla lighthouse
- Location: Reggio Calabria; Calabria; Italy
- Coordinates: 38°15′23″N 15°42′52″E

Tower
- Constructed: 1913
- Construction: masonry tower
- Height: 6 metres (20 ft)
- Shape: cylindrical tower with gallery and lantern
- Markings: white tower with a black band at the base, grey metallic lantern dome
- Power source: mains electricity
- Operator: Marina Militare

Light
- First lit: 1913
- Focal height: 72 metres (236 ft)
- Lens: type OR 250
- Intensity: AL 1000W
- Range: main: 22 nautical miles (41 km; 25 mi) reserve: 18 nautical miles (33 km; 21 mi)
- Characteristic: Fl W 5s.
- Italy no.: 2712 E.F

Scilla Lighthouse (Italian: Faro di Scilla) is an active lighthouse in Calabria just opposite of Capo Peloro Lighthouse which is on the Sicilian coast; both lighthouses direct the ships from the north into the Strait of Messina. The lighthouse is settled on the seaward side terrace of the Castello Ruffo di Scilla, in the town of Scilla on the Tyrrhenian Sea.

== Description ==
The lighthouse, built in 1913, consists of a cylindrical masonry tower, 6 metres (20 ft) high, with balcony and lantern. The tower is painted white with a black band at the base, the lantern dome is grey metallic.

The light is positioned at 72 metres (236 ft) above sea level and emits one white flash in a 5 seconds period, visible up to a distance of 22 nautical miles (41 km; 25 mi). The lighthouse is completely automated and managed by the Marina Militare with the identification code number 2712 E.F.

== See also ==
- List of lighthouses in Italy
