= Out of the frying pan into the fire =

Phrase originating from a 15th-century fable

The phrase out of the frying pan into the fire is used to describe the situation of moving or getting from a bad or difficult situation to a worse one, often as the result of trying to escape from the bad or difficult one. It was the subject of a 15th-century fable that eventually entered the Aesopic canon.

== History ==
The proverb and several similar European proverbs ultimately derive from a Greek saying about running from the smoke or the fire into the flame, the first recorded use of which was in a poem by Germanicus Caesar (15 BCE – 19 CE) in the Greek Anthology. There it is applied to a hare in flight from a dog that attempts to escape by jumping into the sea, only to be seized by a 'sea-dog'. The Latin equivalent was the seafaring idiom of Scylla and Charybdis, 'He runs on Scylla, wishing to avoid Charybdis' (incidit in scyllam cupiens vitare charybdim), a parallel pointed out by Edmund Arwaker in the moral that follows his verse treatment of the fable. The earliest recorded use of the English idiom was by Thomas More in the course of a pamphlet war with William Tyndale. In The Confutacyon of Tyndales Answere (1532) More asserted that his adversary 'featly conuayed himself out of the frying panne fayre into the fyre'.

The Italian author Laurentius Abstemius wrote a collection of 100 fables, the Hecatomythium, during the 1490s. This included some based on popular idioms and proverbs of the day, of which still waters run deep is another example. A previous instance of such adaptation was Phaedrus, who had done much the same to the proverb about The Mountain in Labour. Abstemius' fable 20, De piscibus e sartigine in prunas desilentibus, concerns some fish thrown live into a frying pan of boiling fat. One of them urges its fellows to save their lives by jumping out, but when they do so they fall into the burning coals and curse its bad advice. The fabulist concludes: 'This fable warns us that when we are avoiding present dangers, we should not fall into even worse peril.'

The tale was included in Latin collections of Aesop's fables from the following century onwards, but the first person to adapt it into English was Roger L'Estrange in 1692.

== Uses ==
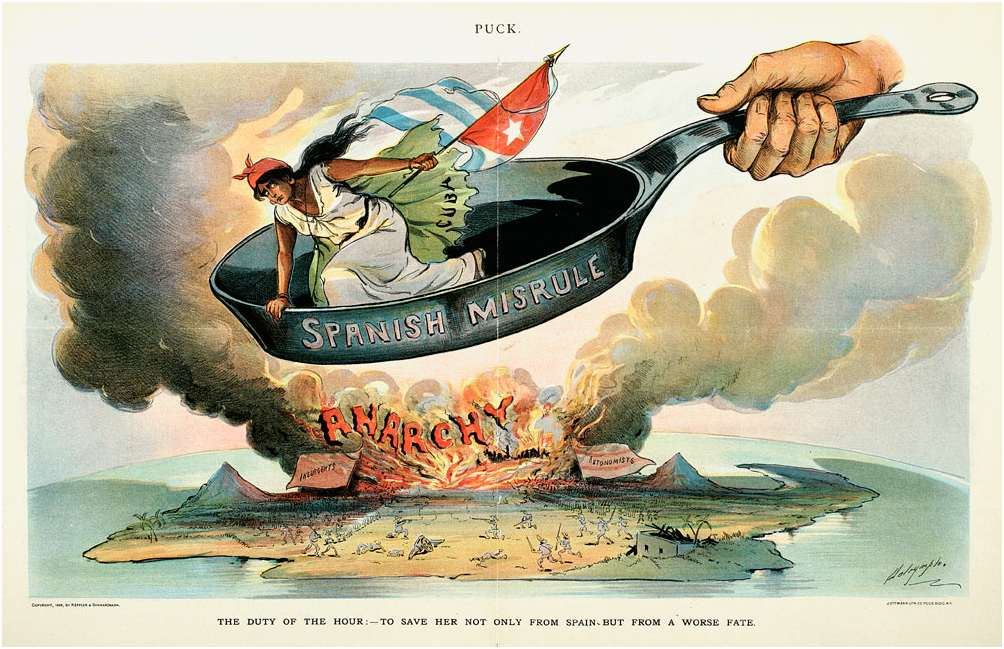
A cartoon from Puck by Louis Dalrymple urging American intervention in Cuba in 1898

The anonymous author of the 1708 work Aesop at Oxford wrote a political fable "Worse and Worse" in which the fish jump 'Out of the Frying-Pan, into the Fire' by a collective decision. The moral it illustrates is drawn from a contemporary episode in Polish politics. Another political interpretation was given in 1898 by a cartoon in the American magazine Puck, urging American intervention in Cuba on the eve of the Spanish–American War (illustrated). More recently, a report in The Guardian about the climate crisis stated that a panel session twice had to be moved because of climate-induced bushfires. The ultimate location was Canberra, also at that time under serious threat from bushfires. The author repeated the frying pan/fire proverb without further comment.

J. R. R. Tolkien titled a chapter of his novel The Hobbit "Out of the Frying-Pan into the Fire", in which the protagonists escape goblins into a forest, only to create a non-metaphorical fire around and under themselves as wolflike wargs attack. Tolkien then has the character Bilbo create a proverb "Escaping goblins to be caught by wolves!", noting the modern frying pan/fire equivalent "in the same sort of uncomfortable situation".

The proverb has equivalents in other languages and is used similarly as a title; for instance, in Swedish, the proverb is Ur askan i elden ('Out of the ashes into the fire'), and this is used as a film title.

== See also ==
- Lesser of two evils principle
- Between Scylla and Charybdis
