= Aesop and the Ferryman =

Aesop's fable

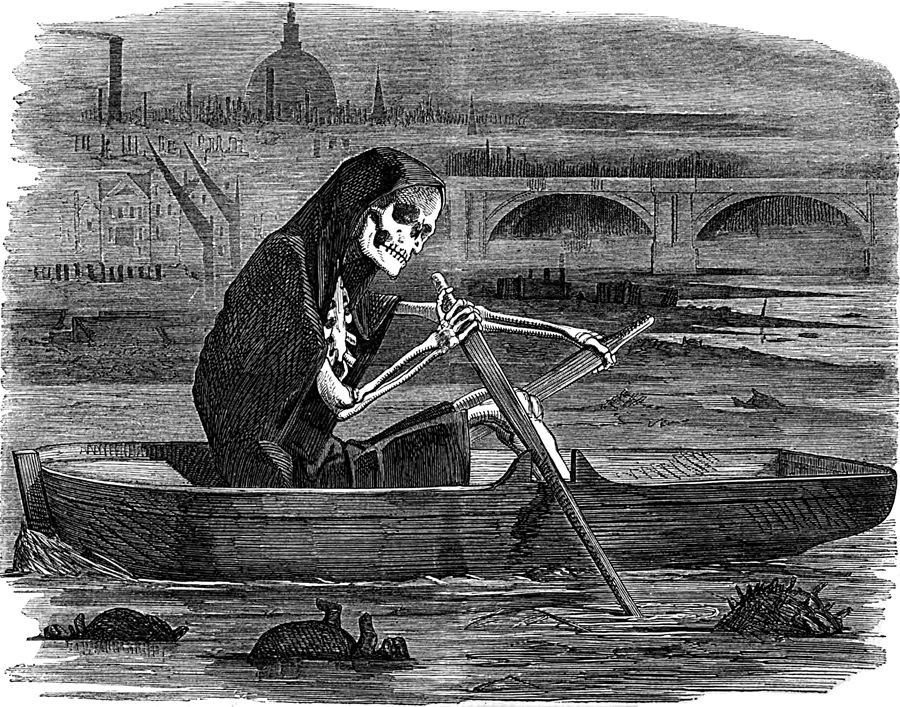
"Death as a ferryman", a satirical drawing from Punch, 1858

Aesop sometimes plays a part in his own fables where the circumstances in which he tells the story are mentioned. In this he is mocked by a Ferryman, or boat-builders in another account, and tells them how they will soon be out of a job.

== Aetiological myth ==
Aristotle mentions in his Meteorologica how Aesop once teased a ferryman by relating to him a myth concerning Charybdis. With one gulp of the sea she brought the mountains to view; islands appeared after the next. The third is yet to come and will dry the sea altogether, thus depriving the ferryman of his livelihood. Aristotle's reason for reporting this was in connection with the belief of the pre-Socratic philosopher Democritus that the sea's level was gradually lowering and that it would eventually disappear.

Some centuries later, a similar retort was recorded by Babrius when Aesop was mocked by shipbuilders. In this case he told them the creation myth in which the king of the gods wished to make dry land emerge when there was only chaos and water. Earth was therefore commanded to take three gulps, the third of which will dry up the sea altogether. The fable is numbered 8 in the Perry Index. Babrius commented on the situation that people who cheek those smarter than themselves are asking for trouble.
