= Libyan Sibyl =

Priestess in Greek mythology

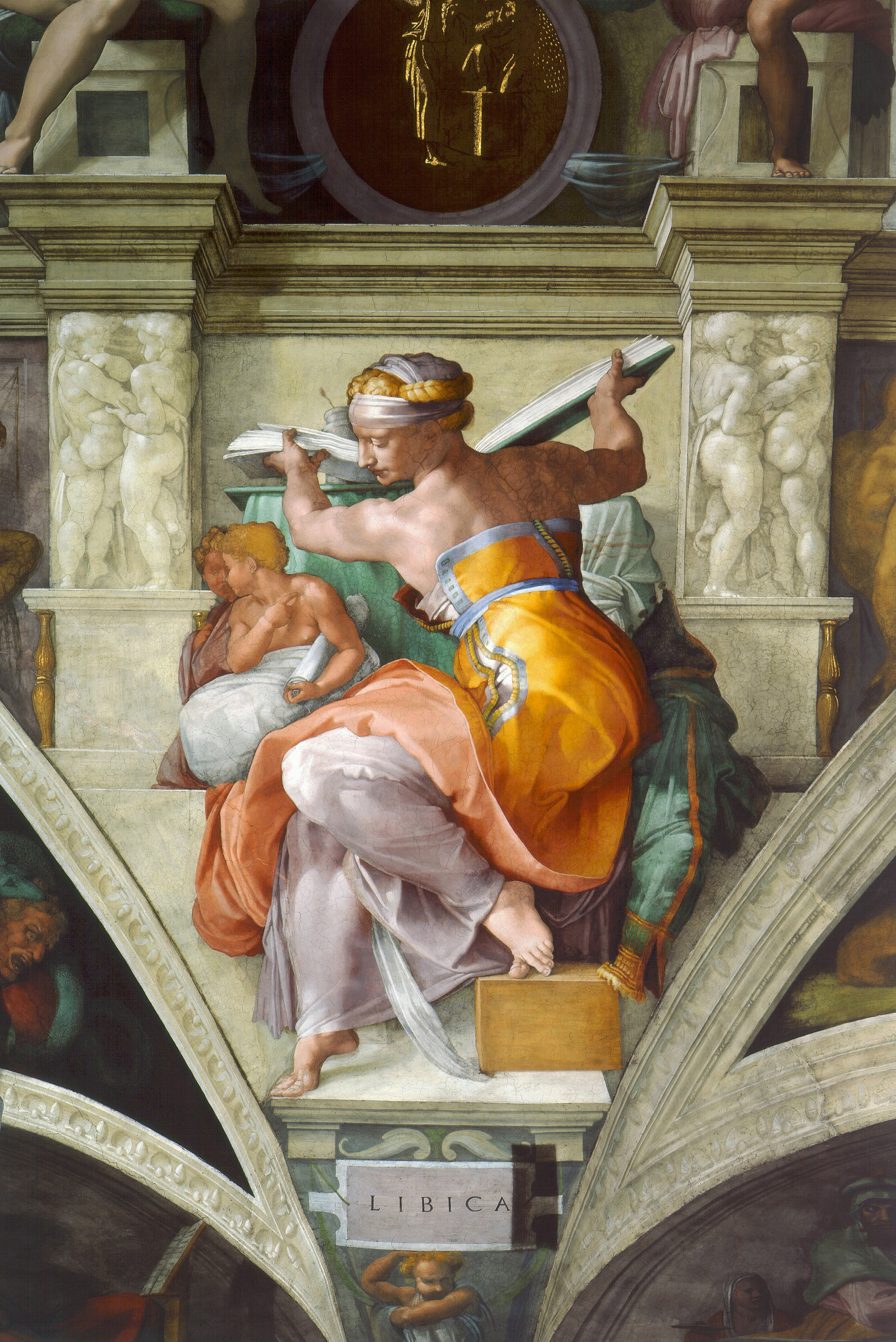
Michelangelo's rendering of the Libyan Sibyl on the Sistine Chapel ceiling

The Libyan Sibyl was the prophetic priestess presiding over the Oracle of Zeus-Ammon (Zeus represented with the Horns of Ammon) at Siwa Oasis in the Libyan Desert.

The term sibyl comes (via Latin) from the ancient Greek word sibylla, meaning prophetess. There were many Sibyls in the ancient world, but the Libyan Sibyl, in Classical mythology, foretold the "coming of the day when that which is hidden shall be revealed."

In Pausanias' Description of Greece, the Sibyl names her parents in her oracles:

I am by birth half mortal, half divine;
An immortal nymph was my mother, my father an eater of grain;
On my mother's side of Idaean birth, but my fatherland was red
Marpessus, sacred to the Mother, and the river Aidoneus. (Pausanias 10.12.3)

The Greeks say she was the daughter of Lamia – a daughter of Poseidon – and Zeus. Euripides mentions the Libyan Sibyl in the prologue of the Lamia. The Greeks further state that she was the first woman to chant oracles; that she lived most of her life in Samos; and that the name Sibyl was given her by the Libyans.

Serapion, in his epic verses, says that the Sibyl, even when dead, ceased not from divination. He writes that what proceeded from her into the air after her death was what gave oracular utterances in voices and omens; and on her body being changed into earth, and the grass as natural growing out of it, whatever beasts happening to be in that place fed on it exhibited to men an accurate knowledge of futurity by their entrails. He also thinks that the face seen in the moon is her soul.

Plutarch tells the story that Alexander the Great, after founding Alexandria, marched to Siwa Oasis where the Sibyl is said to have confirmed him as both a divine personage and the legitimate Pharaoh of Egypt.

A sketch in red chalk was found in the United States and sent to Christie's for valuation. It was identified as a study by Michelangelo for the right foot of his fresco of this sibyl on the ceiling of the Sistine Chapel. In 2026 was sold for $23 million.
