= Between Scylla and Charybdis =

Idiom deriving from Greek mythology, "to choose the lesser of two evils"

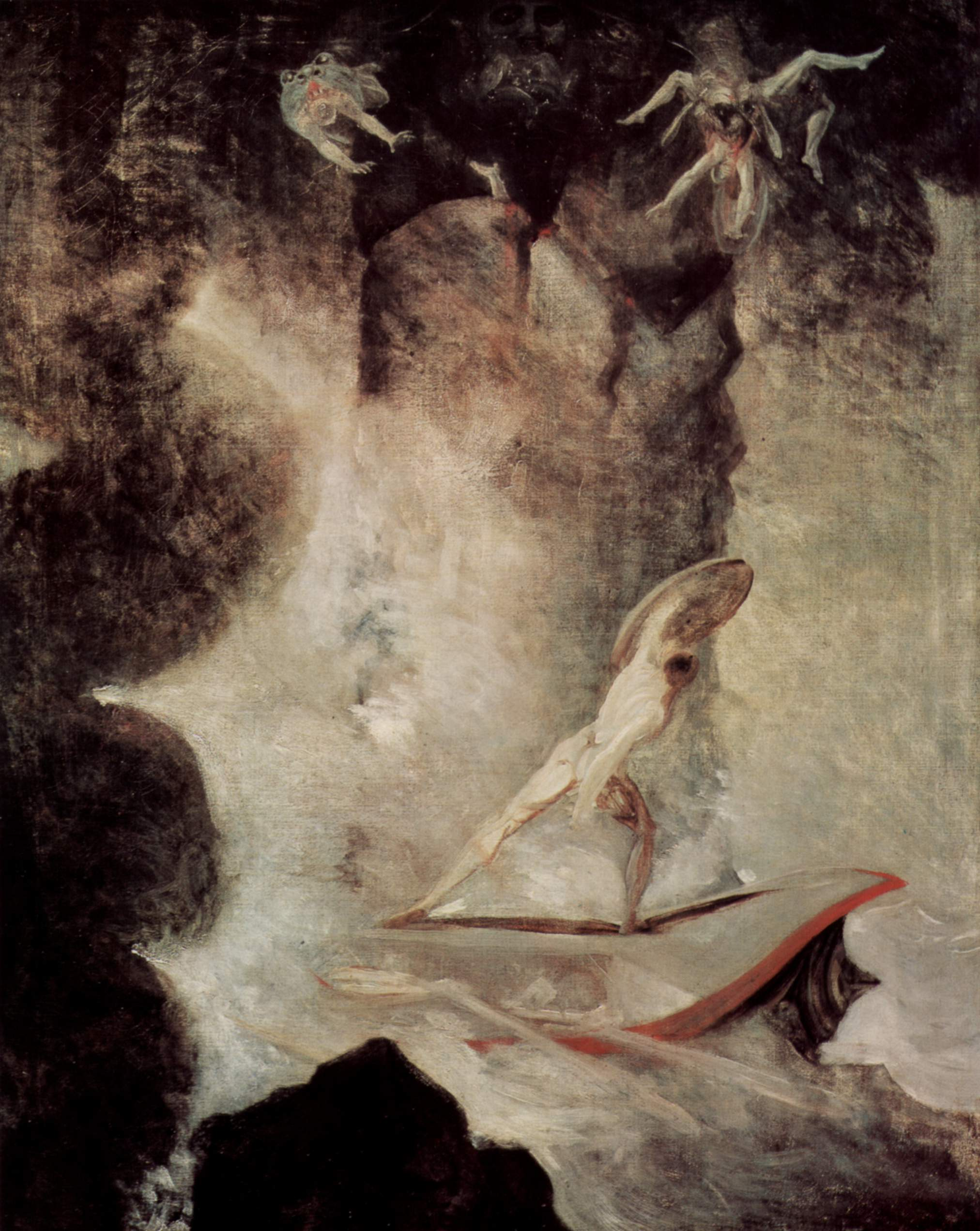
Henry Fuseli's painting of Odysseus facing the choice between Scylla and Charybdis, 1794–1796

Being "between Scylla and Charybdis" (/bi.ˈtwiːn ˈsɪ.lə ænd kə.ˈrɪb.dɪs/ also /bə-, bɪ-/) is an idiom deriving from Greek mythology, which has been associated with the proverbial advice "to choose the lesser of two evils". Several other idioms such as "on the horns of a dilemma", "between the devil and the deep blue sea", and "between a rock and a hard place" express similar meanings. The mythical situation also developed a proverbial use in which seeking to choose between equally dangerous extremes is seen as leading inevitably to disaster.

== The myth and its proverbial use ==
Scylla and Charybdis were mythical sea monsters noted by Homer; Greek mythology sited them on opposite sides of the Strait of Messina between Sicily and Calabria, on the Italian mainland. Scylla was rationalized as a rock shoal (described as a six-headed sea monster) on the Calabrian side of the strait and Charybdis was a whirlpool off the coast of Sicily. They were regarded as maritime hazards located close enough to each other that they posed an inescapable threat to passing sailors; avoiding Charybdis meant passing too close to Scylla and vice versa. According to Homer's account, Odysseus was advised to pass by Scylla and lose only a few sailors, rather than risk the loss of his entire ship in the whirlpool.

Because of such stories, the bad result of having to navigate between the two hazards eventually entered proverbial use. Erasmus recorded it in his Adagia (1515) under the Latin form of evitata Charybdi in Scyllam incidi (having escaped Charybdis I fell into Scylla) and also provided a Greek equivalent. After relating the Homeric account and reviewing other connected uses, he went on to explain that the proverb could be applied in three different ways. In circumstances where there is no escape without some cost, the correct course is to "choose the lesser of two evils". Alternatively it may signify that the risks are equally great, whatever one does. A third use is in circumstances where a person has gone too far in avoiding one extreme and has tumbled into its opposite. In this context Erasmus quoted another line that had become proverbial, incidit in Scyllam cupiēns vītāre Charybdem (into Scylla he fell, wishing to avoid Charybdis). This final example was a line from the Alexandreis, a 12th-century Latin epic poem by Walter of Châtillon.

The myth was later given an allegorical interpretation by the French poet Barthélemy Aneau in his emblem book Picta Poesis (1552). There one is advised, much in the spirit of the commentary of Erasmus, that the risk of being envied for wealth or reputation is preferable to being swallowed by the Charybdis of poverty: "Choose the lesser of these evils. A wise man would rather be envied than miserable." Erasmus too had associated the proverb about choosing the lesser of two evils, as well as Walter of Châtillon’s line, with the Classical adage. A later English translation glossed the adage's meaning with a third proverb, that of "falling, as we say, out of the frying pan into the fire, in which form the proverb has been adopted by the French, the Italians and the Spanish." Brewer's Dictionary of Phrase and Fable also treated the English proverb as an established equivalent of the allusion to falling from Scylla into Charybdis.

== Cultural references ==
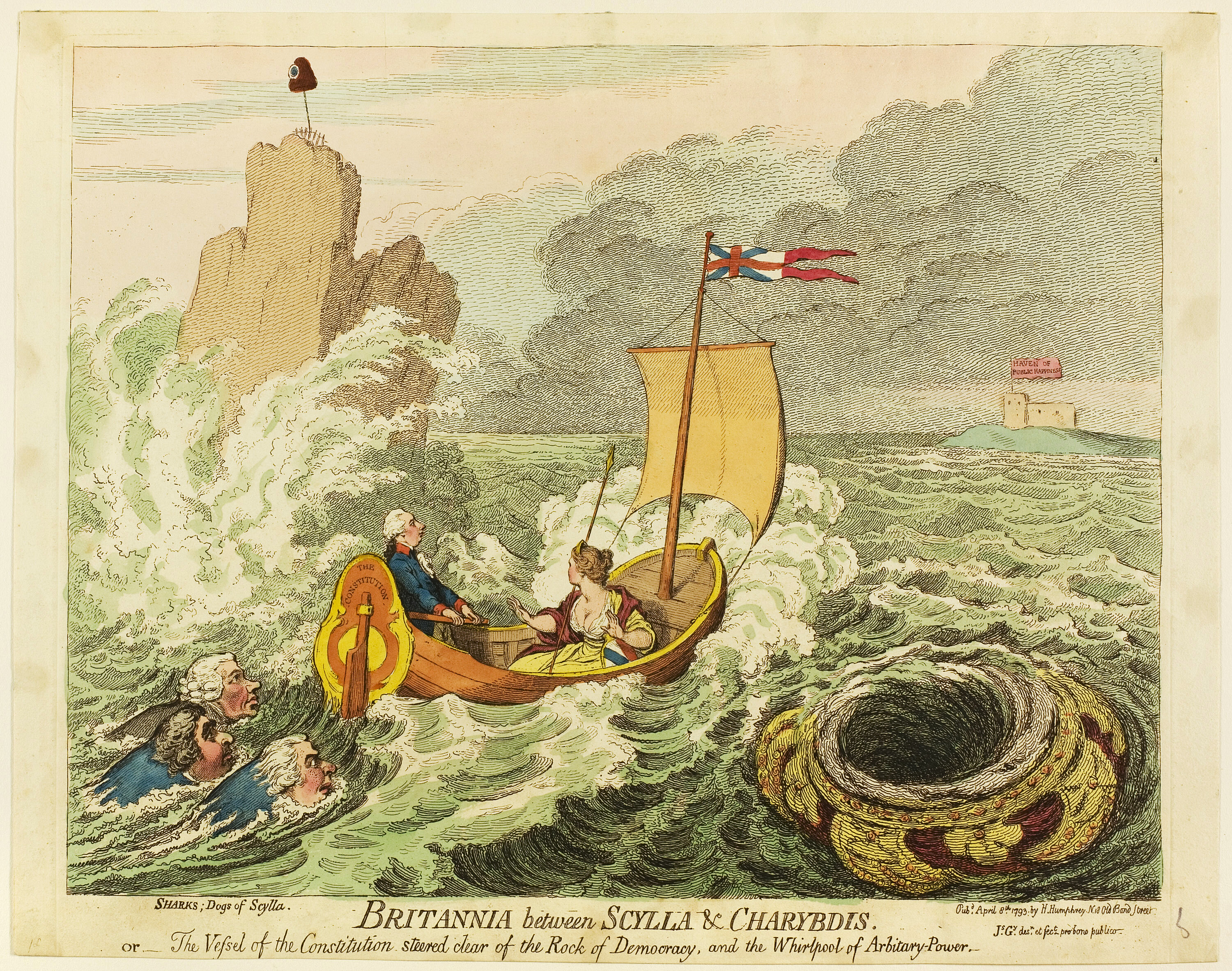
Britannia between Scylla and Charybdis (James Gillray, 1793)

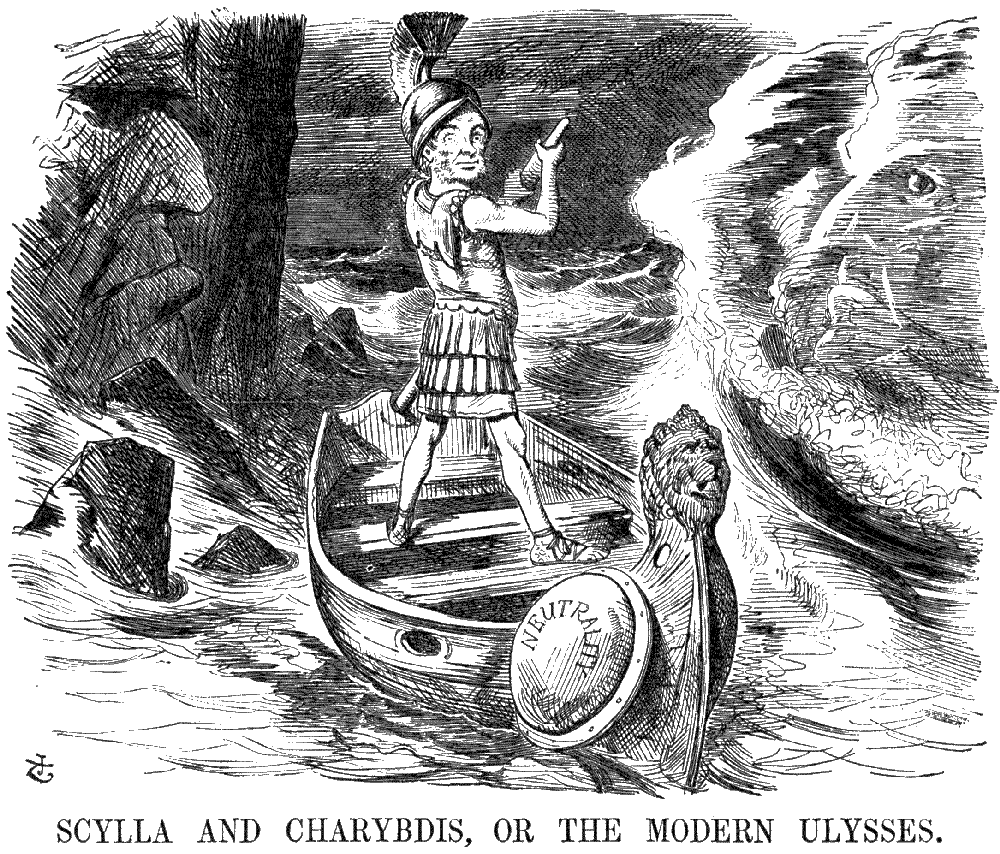
Scylla and Charybdis, or the Modern Ulysses (John Tenniel, 1863)

The story was often applied to political situations at a later date. In James Gillray's 1793 cartoon, Britannia between Scylla and Charybdis, "William Pitt helms the ship Constitution, containing an alarmed Britannia, between the rock of democracy (with the liberty cap on its summit) and the whirlpool of arbitrary power (in the shape of an inverted crown), to the distant haven of liberty". This was in the context of the effect of the French Revolution on politics in Britain. That the dilemma had still to be resolved in the aftermath of the revolution is suggested by Percy Bysshe Shelley's returning to the idiom in his 1820 essay A Defence of Poetry: "The rich have become richer, and the poor have become poorer; and the vessel of the state is driven between the Scylla and Charybdis of anarchy and despotism."

A later Punch caricature by John Tenniel, dated 10 October 1863, pictures the prime minister Lord Palmerston carefully steering the British ship of state between the perils of Scylla, a craggy rock in the form of a grim-visaged Abraham Lincoln, and Charybdis, a whirlpool which foams and froths into a likeness of Jefferson Davis. A shield emblazoned "Neutrality" hangs on the ship's thwarts, referring to how Palmerston tried to maintain a strict impartiality towards both combatants in the American Civil War. American satirical magazine Puck also used the myth in a caricature by F. Graetz, dated November 26, 1884, in which the unmarried president-elect Grover Cleveland rows desperately between snarling monsters captioned "Mother-in-law" and "Office Seekers".

In the world of literature, Victor Hugo uses the equivalent French idiom (tomber de Charybde en Scylla) in his novel Les Misérables (1862), again in a political context, as a metaphor for the staging of two rebel barricades during the climactic uprising in Paris. The first chapter of the final volume is titled "The Charybdis of the Faubourg Saint-Antoine and the Scylla of the Faubourg du Temple". James Joyce uses the idiom to frame the events in Episode 9 of Ulysses (1922).

In the world of music, the second line of The Police's single "Wrapped Around Your Finger" (1983) uses the idiom as a metaphor for being in a dangerous relationship; this is reinforced by a later mention of the similar idiom of "devil and the deep blue sea." American heavy metal band Trivium also referenced it in "Torn Between Scylla and Charybdis," a track from their 2008 album Shogun, in which the lyrics are about having to choose "between death and doom." In 2014, Graham Waterhouse composed a piano quartet titled Skylla and Charybdis. According to his programme note, its four movements "do not refer specifically to the protagonists or to events connected with the famous legend"; they reflect images "conj[u]red up in the composer's mind during the writing".

== See also ==
- Catch-22 (logic)
- Dilemma
- Hobson's choice
- Lesser of two evils principle
- Morton's fork
- Out of the frying pan into the fire
