= Lamia (daughter of Poseidon) =

Greek mythology figure

In Greek mythology, Lamia (/ˈleɪmiə/; Ancient Greek: Λάμια) was a daughter of Poseidon, and mother, by Zeus, of the Libyan Sibyl. It was perhaps this Lamia who, according to Stesichorus, was the mother of Scylla.
