= Marina Grande, Scilla =

Area in Calabria

Coordinates: 38.253°N 15.712°E

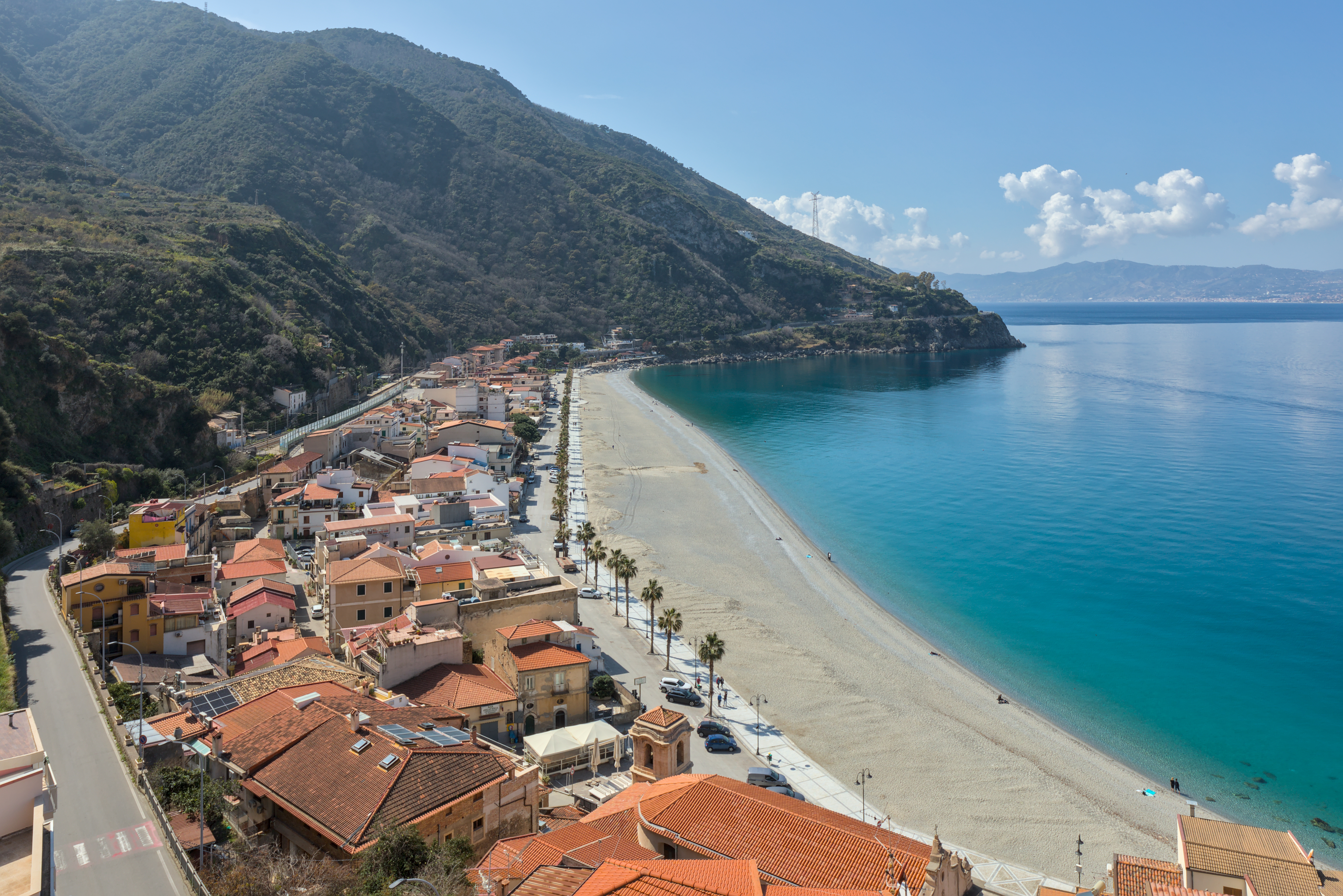
A view of Marina Grande from Piazza San Rocco.

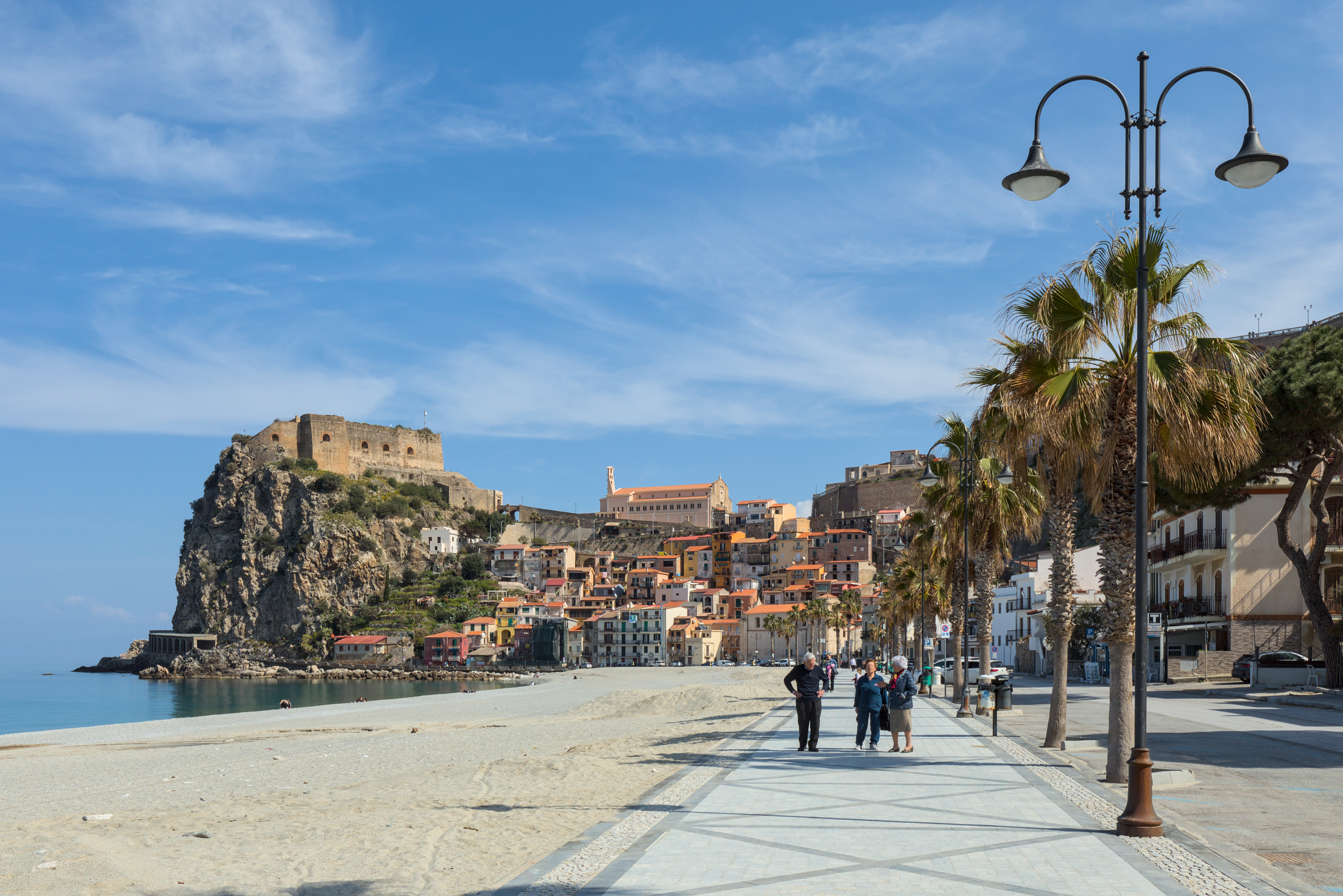
Marina Grande beach, with the castle in the background.

Marina Grande is an area of the town of Scilla, province of Reggio Calabria, Italy.

It's the site of the station of Scilla of the Ferrovie dello Stato.

The area is also famous as Scilla Marina, Marina di Scilla, Lido di Scilla, Spiaggia delle Sirene or, more simply, Spiaggia di Scilla.

== Religious traditions ==
- The bay of Marina Grande is the location of the Fuochi di Mezzanotte (Midnight Fireworks'), last celebration of the festival of Saint Roch, patrono of the town of Scilla, which calling a lot of people from different part of Calabria and Eastern Sicily.
- The new parochial authorities reduced, in 2004, the celebrations in honour of Saint Francis of Paola in Marina Grande and, from 2005, they abolished the festival, breaking a multisecular tradition, revived since 2009 after a new turnover in the Catholic community leadership.
