= Scylla =

Monster in Greek mythology

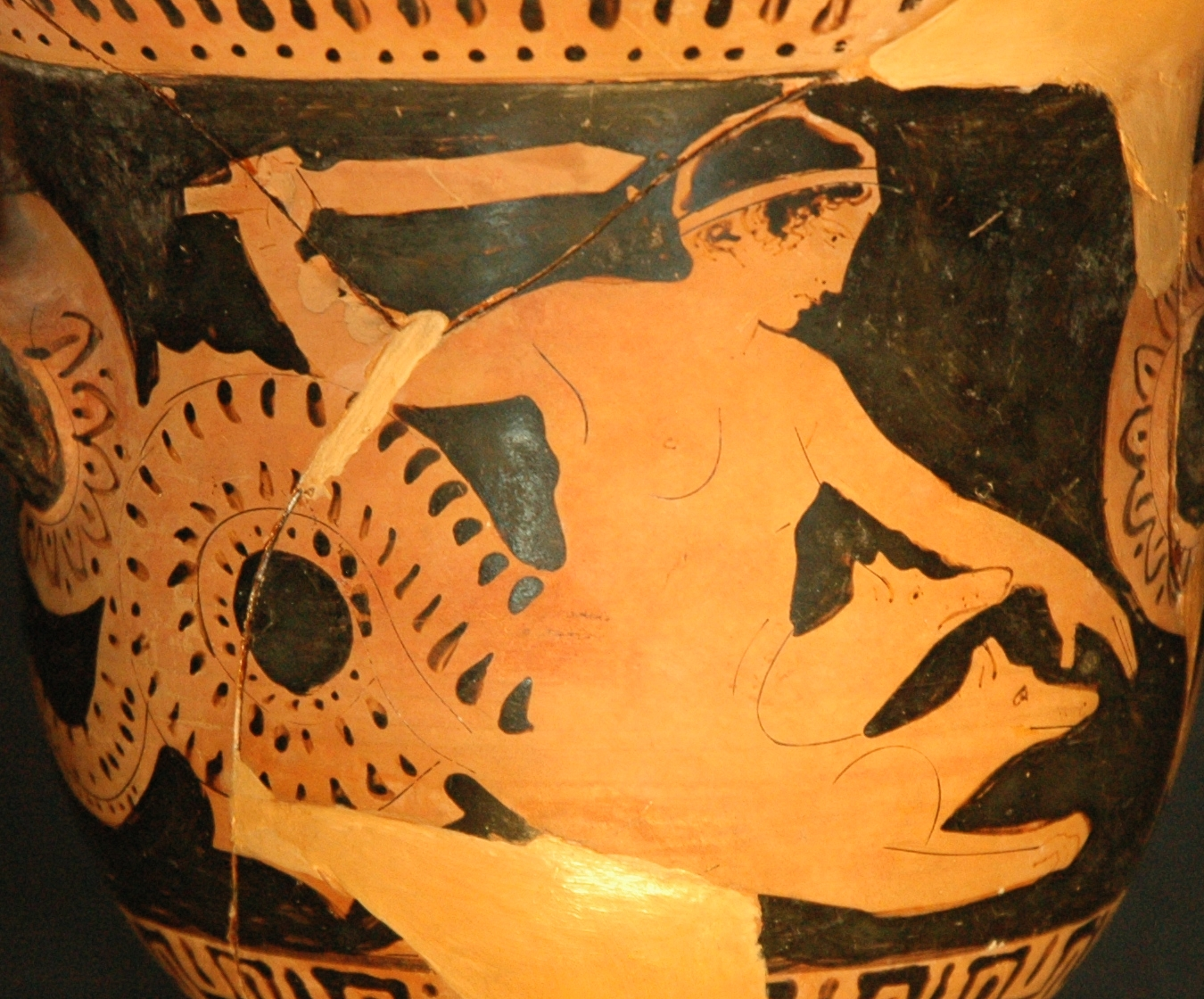
Scylla was a maiden with a kētos tail and dog heads sprouting from her body. Detail from a red-figure bell-crater in the Louvre, 450–425 BC. This form of Scylla was prevalent in ancient depictions, though very different from the description in Homer, where she is land-based and more dragon-like.

In Greek mythology, Scylla (Note: The Middle English Scylle (/ˈsɪliː/, reflecting Ancient Greek: Σκύλλη) is obsolete.) (/ˈsɪlə/ SIL-ə; Ancient Greek: Σκύλλα, romanized: Skýlla, pronounced [skýlːa]) is a legendary, man-eating monster that lives on one side of a narrow channel of water, opposite her counterpart, the sea-swallowing monster Charybdis. The two sides of the strait are within an arrow's range of each other—so close that sailors attempting to avoid the whirlpools of Charybdis would pass dangerously close to Scylla and vice versa.

Scylla is first attested in Homer's Odyssey, where Odysseus and his crew encounter her and Charybdis on their travels. Later myth provides an origin story as a beautiful nymph who is transformed into a monster.

Book Three of Virgil's Aeneid associates the strait where Scylla dwells with the Strait of Messina between Calabria, a region of Southern Italy, and Sicily. The coastal town of Scilla in Calabria takes its name from the mythological figure of Scylla and it is said to be the home of the nymph.

The Byzantine encyclopedia Suda describes Scylla as having the appearance of a beautiful woman "as far as its eyes," with six dog heads on each side, and a serpent body below.

The idiom "between Scylla and Charybdis" has come to mean being forced to choose between two similarly undesirable or risky outcomes, similar to "between a rock and a hard place".

== Parentage ==
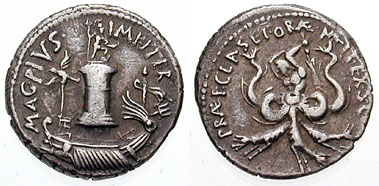
Scylla on the reverse of a first-century BC denarius minted by Sextus Pompeius

The parentage of Scylla varies according to author. Homer, Ovid, Apollodorus, Servius, and a scholiast on Plato, all name Crataeis as the mother of Scylla. Neither Homer nor Ovid mentions a father, but Apollodorus says that the father was either Trienus (probably a textual corruption of Triton) or Phorcus (a variant of Phorkys). Similarly, the Plato scholiast, perhaps following Apollodorus, gives the father as Tyrrhenus or Phorcus, while Eustathius on Homer, Odyssey 12.85, gave the father as Triton, while different account stated Crataeis as the mother.

Other authors have Hecate as Scylla's mother. The Hesiodic Megalai Ehoiai gives Hecate and Phorbas as the parents of Scylla, while Acusilaus says that Scylla's parents were Hecate and Phorkys (so also scholia on Odyssey 12.85).

Perhaps trying to reconcile these conflicting accounts, Apollonius of Rhodes says that Crataeis was another name for Hecate, and that she and Phorcys were the parents of Scylla. Likewise, Semos of Delos says that Crataeis was the daughter of Hecate and Triton, and mother of Scylla by Deimos. Stesichorus (alone) names Lamia as the mother of Scylla, possibly the Lamia who was the daughter of Poseidon, while according to Hyginus, Scylla was the offspring of Typhon and Echidna.

== Narratives ==
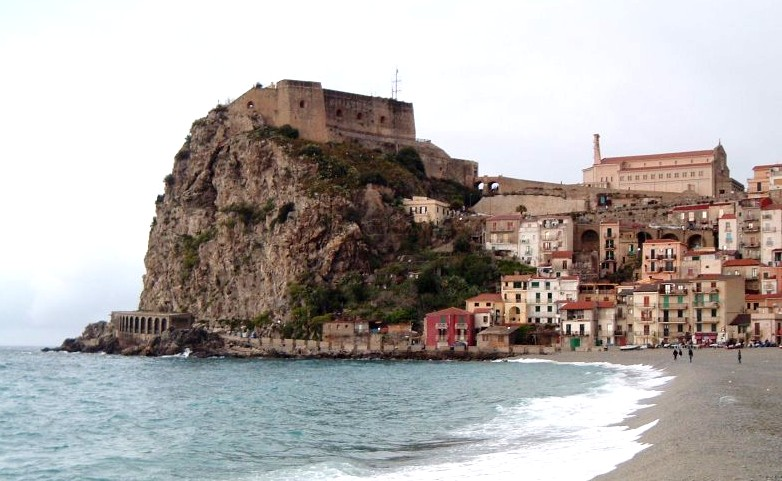
The Rock of Scilla, Calabria, which is said to be the home of Scylla

According to John Tzetzes and Servius' commentary on the Aeneid, Scylla was a beautiful naiad who was claimed by Poseidon, but the jealous Nereid Amphitrite turned her into a terrible monster by poisoning the water of the spring where Scylla would bathe.

A similar story is found in Hyginus, according to whom Scylla was loved by Glaucus, but Glaucus himself was also loved by the goddess sorceress Circe. While Scylla was bathing in the sea, the jealous Circe poured a baleful potion into the sea water which caused Scylla to transform into a frightful monster with six dog forms springing from her thighs. In this form, she attacked Odysseus' ship, robbing him of his companions.

In a late Greek myth, recorded in Eustathius' commentary on Homer and John Tzetzes, Heracles encountered Scylla during a journey to Sicily and slew her. Her father, the sea-god Phorcys, then applied flaming torches to her body and restored her to life.

=== Homer's Odyssey ===
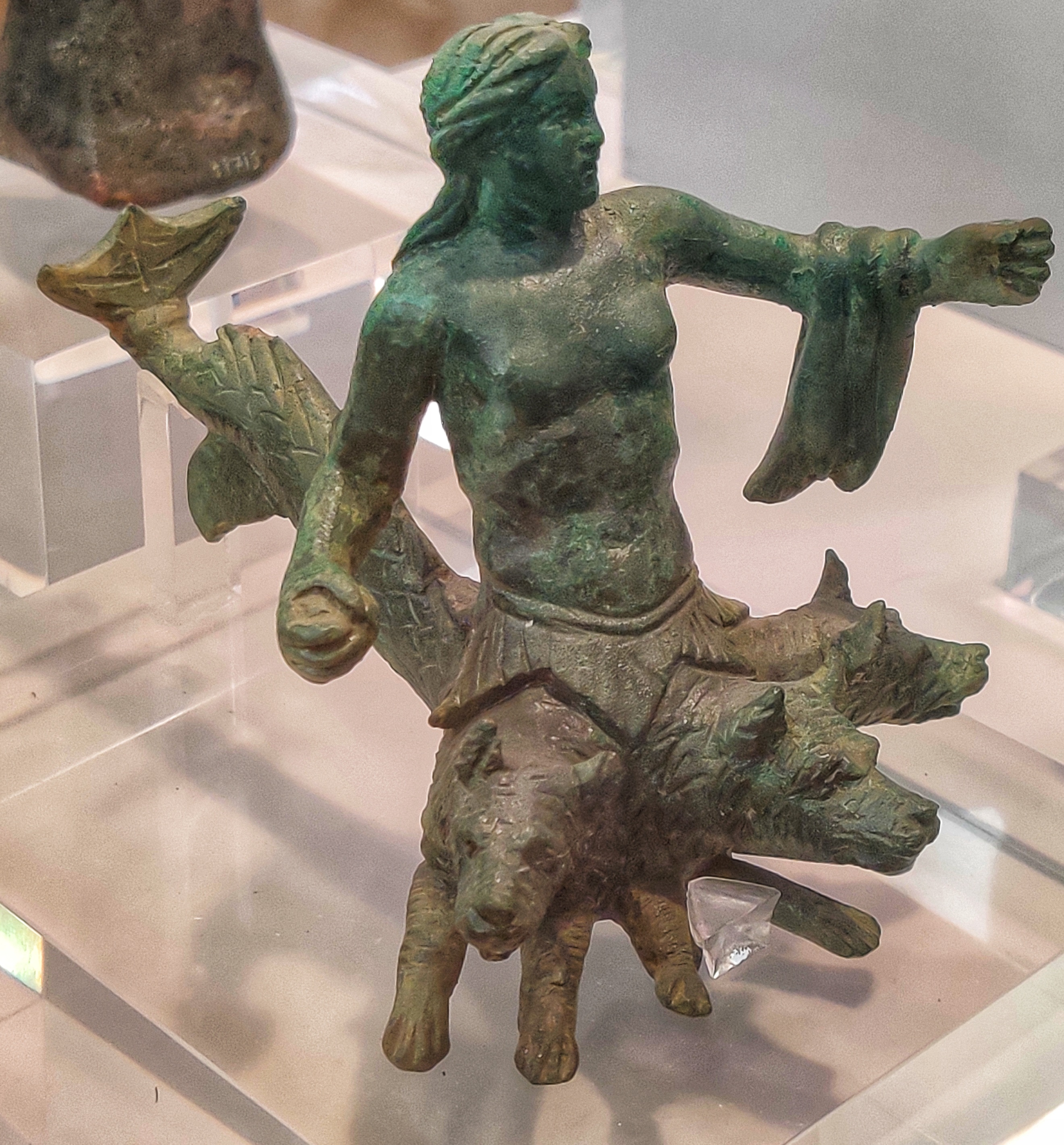
Scylla figurine, late 4th BCE. National Archaeological Museum, Athens

In Homer's Odyssey XII, Odysseus is advised by Circe to sail closer to Scylla, something he never told the rest of his crew, for Charybdis could drown his whole ship: "Hug Scylla's crag—sail on past her—top speed! Better by far to lose six men and keep your ship than lose your entire crew." She also tells Odysseus to ask Scylla's mother, the river nymph Crataeis, to prevent Scylla from pouncing more than once. Odysseus successfully navigates the strait, but when he and his crew are momentarily distracted by Charybdis, Scylla snatches six sailors off the deck and devours them alive.

...they writhed
gasping as Scylla swung them up her cliff and there
at her cavern's mouth she bolted them down raw—
screaming out, flinging their arms toward me,
lost in that mortal struggle.

=== Ovid's Metamorphoses ===
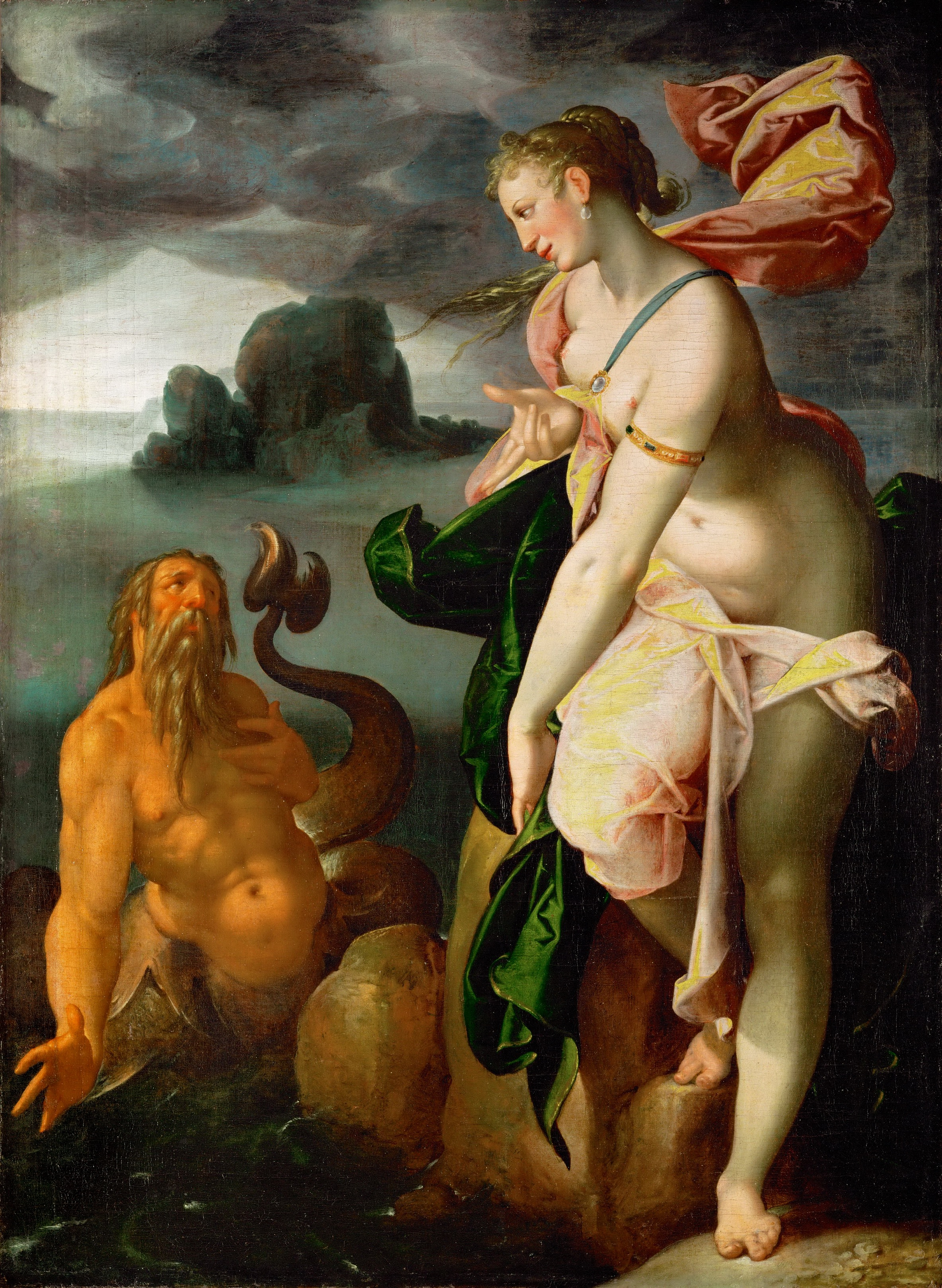
Glaucus and Scylla by Bartholomeus Spranger (c. 1581)

According to Ovid, the fisherman-turned-sea god Glaucus falls in love with the beautiful Scylla, but she is repulsed by his piscine form and flees to a promontory where he cannot follow. When Glaucus goes to Circe to request a love potion that will win Scylla's affections, the enchantress herself becomes enamored with him. Meeting with no success, Circe becomes hatefully jealous of her rival and therefore prepares a vial of poison and pours it into the sea pool where Scylla regularly bathed, transforming her into a thing of terror even to herself.

In vain she offers from herself to run
And drags about her what she strives to shun.

Gaius Julius Hyginus recounts the same version of the story in his Fabulae.

The story was later adapted into a five-act tragic opera, Scylla et Glaucus (1746), by the French composer Jean-Marie Leclair.

=== Keats' Endymion ===
In John Keats' loose retelling of Ovid's version of the myth of Scylla and Glaucus in Book 3 of Endymion (1818), the evil Circe does not transform Scylla into a monster but merely murders the beautiful nymph. Glaucus then takes her corpse to a crystal palace at the bottom of the ocean where lie the bodies of all lovers who have died at sea. After a thousand years, she is resurrected by Endymion and reunited with Glaucus.

=== Palaephatus and Heraclitus Paradoxographus ===
Palaephatus, who sought to rationalize Greek mythology, argues that the myth of Scylla originates from a misinterpretation of historical events. According to his account, Scylla was not originally a monstrous being, described in myth as a woman to the navel with the lower body of a serpent, but a swift Tyrrhenian trireme. The vessel bore the name "Scylla", as inscribed on its prow. At the time, Tyrrhenian ships were engaged in plundering the coasts of Sicily and the Ionian Gulf. Owing to its speed and effectiveness, this ship frequently coordinated or assembled other vessels and consequently became widely known.

In one incident, Odysseus is said to have escaped pursuit by this ship by exploiting a favorable wind. He later recounted the episode in Corcyra to Alcinous, describing both the vessel and the pursuit. Through repeated retellings, these maritime events were gradually transformed, ultimately giving rise to the mythological figure of Scylla as a monstrous creature.

Heraclitus Paradoxographus, who also attempted to rationalize the myths, writes that Scylla was said to devour sailors who passed by her, but in reality she was a beautiful courtesan living on an island. She surrounded herself with greedy followers who behaved like dogs and helped her exploit and destroy her visitors, including some of the companions of Odysseus. However, she was unable to deceive Odysseus himself, because he was always cautious and clever.

=== Procopius ===
The Byzantine author Procopius writes that Scylaeum was said by poets to be where Scylla once lived, not because there really existed there a woman in the form of a beast, but rather because a certain fish, formerly called "scylax" and later renamed "cyniscus", has been found in great abundance in this part of the strait from ancient times even down to his time. He then explains that names in the beginning are always appropriate to the things they describe, but rumour, carrying these names to other peoples, produces false opinions through ignorance of the facts. As time goes on, this process becomes a builder of stories and joins with poets as witnesses of things that never happened, because of the licence of their art. He then gives examples of other similar stories from other places, such as those about dog-headed and wolf-headed people.

=== John Tzetzes ===
Tzetzes offers a thorough rationalization of the myths of Scylla.

In his commentary on Lycophron's Alexandra is interpreting its supernatural elements as descriptions of a real geographical danger. Rather than a monstrous creature, Scylla is identified with a rocky promontory near Rhegium in the Strait of Messina. Beneath this cape lay caves and jagged rocks inhabited by sea creatures. Ships caught in the powerful currents associated with Charybdis were driven against these rocks, and the sailors who perished were said, in mythic language, to have been "devoured" by Scylla.

He similarly reinterprets Heracles encounter with Scylla. While transporting the cattle of Geryon through the strait, Heracles allegedly lost some of his herd in this dangerous area. Being exceptionally wise and resourceful, he is said to have employed certain devices to clear, manage or mitigate the hazard. This practical achievement was later transformed into the mythological claim that Heracles killed Scylla.

The subsequent revival of Scylla by her father Phorcys is also explained naturalistically. Phorcys, as a sea deity, represents the sea itself, which originally created the danger and continually sustains it. The burning and revival of Scylla signify the cyclical action of natural forces. Over time, through the movements of the sea and the influence of the sun, symbolized by the torch, the effects of Heracles intervention were undone. The sea re-established the hazard in its former state, causing Scylla to "come back to life".

He also describes Scylla, in his Chiliades, as a terrible and frightening place located in Sicily, formed of promontories, reefs, and rocks, with sea creatures growing around these rocky formations in great numbers.

== Paintings ==
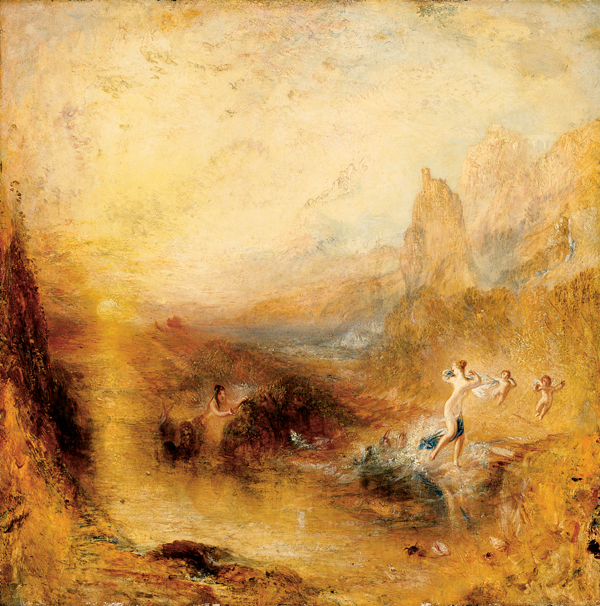
J. M. W. Turner's painting of Scylla fleeing inland from the advances of Glaucus (1841)

At the Carolingian abbey of Corvey in Westphalia, a unique ninth-century wall painting depicts, among other things, Odysseus' fight with Scylla. (Note: via Wikimedia) This illustration is not noted elsewhere in medieval arts.

In the Renaissance and after, it was the story of Glaucus and Scylla that caught the imagination of painters across Europe. In Agostino Carracci's 1597 fresco cycle of The Loves of the Gods in the Farnese Gallery, the two are shown embracing, a conjunction that is not sanctioned by the myth. (Note: at Wikimedia) More orthodox versions show the maiden scrambling away from the amorous arms of the god, as in the oil on copper painting by Filippo Lauri (Note: Magnoliabox Archived 22 March 2014 at the Wayback Machine) and the oil on canvas by Salvator Rosa in the Musée des Beaux-Arts de Caen. (Note: View on the Reproarte site; a preliminary drawing in MFA Boston is dated 1661)

Other painters picture them divided by their respective elements of land and water, as in the paintings of the Flemish Bartholomäus Spranger (1587), now in the Kunsthistorisches Museum, Vienna. (Note: Available in at Wikimedia) Some add the detail of Cupid aiming at the sea-god with his bow, as in the painting of Laurent de la Hyre (1640/4) in the J. Paul Getty Museum (Note: View on the museum website) and that of Jacques Dumont le Romain (1726) at the Musée des beaux-arts de Troyes. Two cupids can also be seen fluttering around the fleeing Scylla in the late painting of the scene by J. M. W. Turner (1841), now in the Kimbell Art Museum. (Note: There is a more conventional print from around 1810/15 in the Tate Gallery)

Peter Paul Rubens shows the moment when the horrified Scylla first begins to change, under the gaze of Glaucus (c. 1636), while Eglon van der Neer's 1695 painting in the Rijksmuseum shows Circe poisoning the water as Scylla prepares to bathe. (Note: View on Flickr) There are also two Pre-Raphaelite treatments of the latter scene by John Melhuish Strudwick (1886) and John William Waterhouse (Circe Invidiosa, 1892).

== General and cited references ==
- Apollodorus, Apollodorus, The Library, with an English Translation by Sir James George Frazer, F.B.A., F.R.S. in 2 Volumes. Cambridge, MA, Harvard University Press; London, William Heinemann Ltd. 1921. Online version at the Perseus Digital Library.
- Apollonius Rhodius (1912), The Argonautica, translated by Robert Cooper Seaton (trans 1912 ed.), W. Heinemann – via Internet Archive
- Campbell, David A., Greek Lyric III: Stesichorus, Ibycus, Simonides, and Others, Harvard University Press, 1991. ISBN 978-0674995253.
- Fowler, R. L., Early Greek Mythography: Volume 2: Commentary, Oxford University Press, 2013. ISBN 978-0198147411.
- Gantz, Timothy, Early Greek Myth: A Guide to Literary and Artistic Sources, Johns Hopkins University Press, 1996, Two volumes: ISBN 978-0-8018-5360-9 (Vol. 1), ISBN 978-0-8018-5362-3 (Vol. 2).
- Hanfmann, George M. A., "The Scylla of Corvey and Her Ancestors" Dumbarton Oaks Papers 41 "Studies on Art and Archeology in Honor of Ernst Kitzinger on His Seventy-Fifth Birthday" (1987), pp. 249–260.
- Hyginus, Gaius Julius, Fabulae, in The Myths of Hyginus, edited and translated by Mary A. Grant, Lawrence: University of Kansas Press, 1960. Online version at ToposText.
- Most, G.W., Hesiod: The Shield, Catalogue of Women, Other Fragments, Loeb Classical Library, No. 503, Cambridge, Massachusetts, Harvard University Press, 2007, 2018. ISBN 978-0-674-99721-9. Online version at Harvard University Press.
- Ogden, Daniel (2013). Drakon: Dragon Myth and Serpent Cult in the Greek and Roman Worlds. Oxford University Press. ISBN 9780199557325.
- Stesichorus, in Greek Lyric, Volume III: Stesichorus, Ibycus, Simonides, and Others. Edited and translated by David A. Campbell. Loeb Classical Library 476. Cambridge, MA: Harvard University Press, 1991.
- Tzetzes, John, Lycophronis Alexandra. Vol. II: Scholia Continens, edited by Eduard Scheer, Berlin, Weidmann, 1881. Internet Archive.
- Virgil, Aeneid. Translated by Frederick Ahl: Oxford University Press, 2007.
