= Charybdis =

Sea monster in Greek mythology

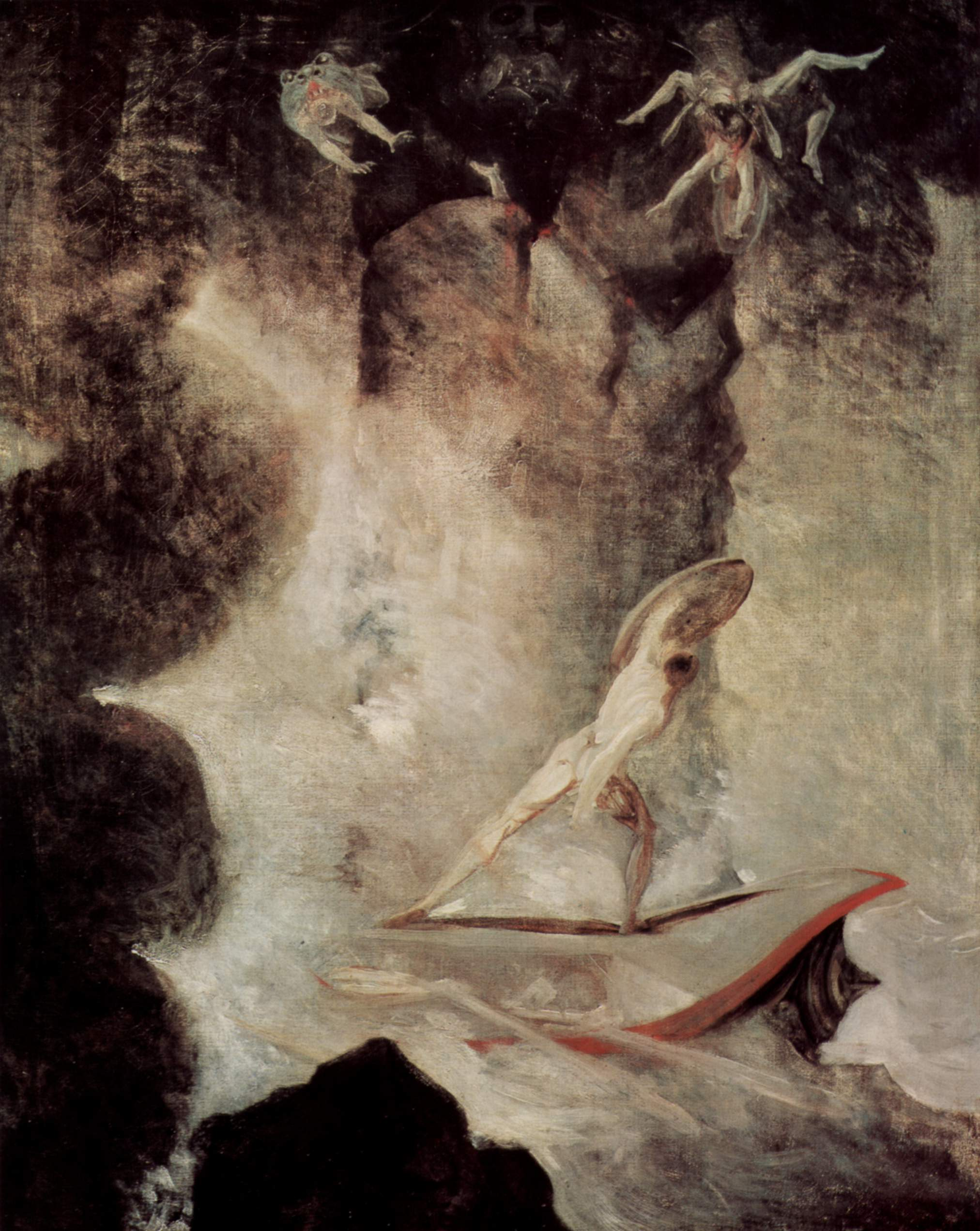
Henry Fuseli's painting of Odysseus facing the choice between Scylla and Charybdis, 1794–1796

Charybdis (/kəˈrɪbdɪs/; Ancient Greek: Χάρυβδις, romanized: Khárybdis, Attic Greek: [kʰárybdis]; Latin: Charybdis, Classical Latin: [kʰäˈrʏbd̪ɪs̠]) is a sea monster in Greek mythology. Along with the sea monster Scylla, she appears as a challenge to epic characters such as Odysseus, Jason, and Aeneas. The descriptions of Greek mythical chroniclers and Greek historians locate her in the Strait of Messina.

The idiom "between Scylla and Charybdis" has come to mean being forced to choose between two similarly dangerous situations.

== Description ==
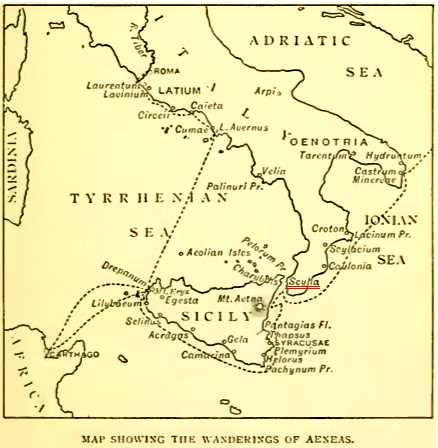
The Strait of Messina, with Scylla (underlined in red) and Charybdis on the opposite shores

The sea monster Charybdis was believed to live under a small rock on one side of a narrow channel. Opposite her was Scylla, another sea monster, who lived inside a much larger rock. The sides of the strait were within an arrow-shot of each other, and sailors attempting to avoid one of them would come in reach of the other. To be "between Scylla and Charybdis" therefore means to be presented with two opposite dangers, the task being to find a route that avoids both. Three times a day, Charybdis swallowed a huge amount of water, before belching it back out again, creating large whirlpools capable of dragging a ship underwater. In some variations of the story, Charybdis was simply a large whirlpool instead of a sea monster.

Through the descriptions of Greek mythical chroniclers and Greek historians such as Thucydides, modern scholars generally agree that Charybdis was said to have been located in the Strait of Messina, off the coast of Sicily and opposite a rock on the mainland identified with Scylla. A whirlpool does exist there, caused by currents meeting, but it is dangerous only to small craft in extreme conditions.

John Tzetzes, in his Chiliades, describes Charybdis as a terrible and violent stream located in Sicily. He portrays it as a place where the waters flow and bubble like a boiling cauldron, creating a powerful and frightening movement of the sea. Tzetzes explains that this turbulent flow is caused by the convergence of different waters: the narrow Tyrrhenian Sea from the west, the Sicilian and Cretan seas from the south and east, and the Adriatic Sea from the north, which flow into the Ionian Sea. The combined force of these waters causes Charybdis to whirl constantly and produce a terrifying sound like a fire-heated cauldron. He further states that Plato sailed through the area three times during his journeys to Sicily.

== Family ==
Another myth makes Charybdis the daughter of Poseidon and Gaia and living as a loyal servant to her father.

== Mythology ==
=== Origin ===
Charybdis aided her father Poseidon in his feud with her paternal uncle Zeus and, as such, helped him engulf lands and islands in water. Zeus, angry over the land she stole from him, hurled a thunderbolt which sent her down to the seabed; from there, she drank the surrounding seawater thrice a day, creating whirlpools. She lingered on a rock with Scylla facing her directly on another rock, making a strait.

In some myths, Charybdis was a voracious woman who stole oxen from Heracles, and was hurled by the thunderbolt of Zeus into the sea, where she retained her voracious nature.

=== The Odyssey ===
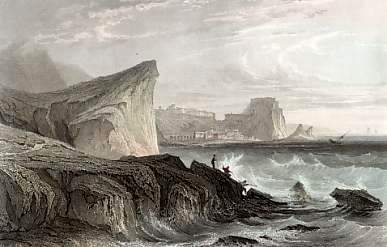
A 19th-century engraving of the Strait of Messina, the site associated with Scylla and Charybdis

Odysseus faced both Charybdis and Scylla while rowing through a narrow channel. He ordered his men to avoid Charybdis, thus forcing them to pass near Scylla, which resulted in the deaths of six of his men. Later, stranded on a raft, Odysseus was swept back through the strait and passed near Charybdis. His raft was sucked into her maw, but he survived by clinging to a fig tree growing on a rock over her lair. On the next outflow of water, when his raft was expelled, Odysseus recovered it and paddled away safely.

=== Jason and the Argonauts ===
The Argonauts were able to avoid both dangers because Hera ordered the Nereid Thetis to guide them through the perilous passage.

=== The Aeneid ===
In the Aeneid, the Trojans are warned by Helenus of Scylla and Charybdis, and are advised to avoid them by sailing around Pachynus Point (Cape Passero) rather than risk the strait. Later, however, they find themselves passing Etna, and have to row for their lives to escape Charybdis.

=== Aesop ===
Aristotle mentions in his Meteorologica that Aesop once teased a ferryman by telling him a myth concerning Charybdis. With one gulp of the sea, she brought the mountains to view; islands appeared after the next. The third is yet to come and will dry the sea altogether, thus depriving the ferryman of his livelihood.
