= Balaur =

Serpent or dragon of Romanian folklore

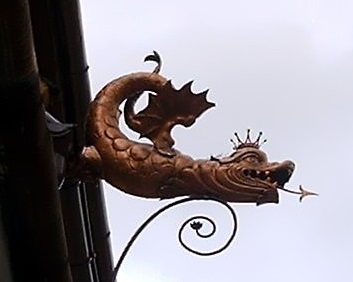
A dragon sculpture in Romania.

A balaur (pl. balauri) in Romanian folklore is a type of many-headed dragon or monstrous serpent, sometimes said to be equipped with wings. The number of heads is usually around three, but they can also have seven heads or even twelve heads according to some legends.

The balaur in folktale is typically evil, demanding or abducting young maidens or the princess, and defeated by the hero such as Saint George or the fair youth Făt-Frumos.

There is some lore in which the balaur is considered weather-making, and living in an airborne state, but these types of balaur are sometimes interchangeably called hala or ala, being confounded with the pan-Slavic air and water demon. The balaur (instead of the zmeu) is the vehicle of the weather-controlling Solomonari according to some sources.

There are also legends about the balaur in which they can produce precious stones from their saliva. Also, it is said that whoever manages to slay it will be forgiven a sin.

== General description ==
In the Romanian language, balauri are "monstrous serpents" or dragons. Alternatively, the word balaur can be used to describe any monster like creature. They are many-headed like the Greek hell-hound Cerberus or the hydra and are winged and golden, according to Lazăr Șăineanu.

As reported by journalist Eustace Clare Grenville Murray, in Romanian folklore the balaur or balaurul is a serpentine being who guards treasures and princesses, coming to blows against heroic Fêt-Frumos.

The balaur recurs in Romanian folktales as a ravenous dragon that preys upon maidens only to be defeated by the hero Făt-Frumos ("Handsome Lad"). The balaur may also be the abductor of the princess Ileana Cosânzeana, although according to Șăineanu the kidnapper of this princess is a zmeu in the form of giant with pebbly tails (or scaly tails). It is noted that the balaur and the zmeu are often confounded with each other.

According to folklorist Tudor Pamfile, there are three types of balauri in folk tradition: water-, land-, and air-dwelling. A type of balaur of the first type is a seven-headed monster that dwells in the well of a village, demanding maidens as sacrifice until defeated by either the hero named Busuioc or by Saint George.

The second type of balaur, according to Pamfile, is said to dwell in the "Armenian land" (Romanian: ţara armenească) where they produce precious stones. In Wallachia, it is also believed that the saliva of a balaur can form precious stones, according to American writer Cora Linn Daniels. Romanian scholar Mircea Eliade noted that the notion a precious stones are formed from a snake's spittle is widespread, from England to China. (Note: Eliade refers to his paper on the snake stone (adder stone) "Piatra Sarpelui", Mesterului Manole, Bucharest, 1939, pp. 1–12.)

The balaur is often associated with the weather and is alternatively called hala or ala, which is usually a Slavic term for a weather demon. This is the type Pamfile calls the "third type" that is air-dwelling. When two balauri meet and fight in the air, there ensues various meteorological damages such as uprooting of trees, or objects being tossed about. Another tradition is that the balaur uses the rainbow as its path and sucks moisture from any spot in order to cause rain. There is also lore about the balaur which is said to be quite similar to the Bulgarian Banat lore about the lamia (locally called lam'a), which states that the lam'a draw water from the sea to fill the cloud. (Note: The scholar, Anna Plotnikova, concludes that this lamia lore has been "contaminated" with aspects of the lore about the water and air demon (i.e., the hala).)

Although the dragons ridden by the Solomonari are often said to be zmei (sing. zmeu), they were balauri according to some sources. A balaur was controlled by these weather-controlling sorcerers using "a golden rein" (or golden bridle; Romanian: un frâu de aur). (Note: German: ein goldene Zaum.) The dragons were usually kept hidden in the depths of a lake, until summoned by their riders.

== Name ==
=== In Eastern Romance ===
The word is attested in Daco-Romanian and Aromanian. In Romanian language the word appears with variations: balaoană, bălăuraş, bălăurel, balaurel, bălăuroaică, bălăuaua, and possibly in the shorter form bală. Similar words are attested in Megleno-Romanian, e.g., bular 'a type of large snake' and bălăura 'large (about plums)', and in Aromanian bularu 'red snake'.

=== Slavic comparanda ===
According to Ranko Matasovic, the word appears along the eastern coast of the Adriatic Sea. In this regard, Croatian linguist Peter Skok located the following variations of the lexeme:

- blavor (Montenegro and Dalmatia); blavorak (diminutive, attested in a 16th century writer from Ragusa); blavūr (Ragusa); blavòruša (aumentative; Montenegro)
- bläor (Imotski, Podlug in Cattaro, Benkovac, Jagodnja, Sibenik - all in Dalmatia); blőr; blőruša (Montenegro)
- blaur (Dalmatia), blavorina (aumentative, Koprivno in Sinj, Dalm.), blaorina (Ervenik, Dalm.)
- blahor (Nevesinje in Herzegovina)
- blabor (Tribanj, Dalm.), blaborina (aumentative)

Skok also mentioned the existence of localized dialectal words, to which Orsat Ligorio and Danilo Savić add some forms:

- mulavar (nominative), mulavra (genitive) (Dalm.)
- mulavrina in Sali (Dugi otok)
- mulavâr (Serbo-Croatian dialectal; "confined" to the dialects of Kvarner and Kornati)
- molâvar (Slovene)

The Serbo-Croatian blavor/blaor/blavur ("European legless lizard") is cognate with balaur, and is regarded as one of the few pre-Slavic Balkan relict words in Serbo-Croatian. The word is, however, unattested in Bulgarian, per Skok and Matasovic. (Note: However, Romanian Elena Mihaila-Scarlatoiu indicated that the Romanian word passed into the languages of the nearby regions, like Bulgarian, Albanian and Serbian.)

=== Etymology ===
The term Balaur (Aromanian bul'ar) is of unknown etymology. It has been linked with Albanian boljë/bollë ("snake") and buljar ("water snake"). The Transylvanian Saxon balaur "dragon", and balaura, an insult term in Serbia, are borrowed from Romanian.

The Albanian and Romanian terms possibly stem from the same Thracian root, *bell- or *ber- "beast, monster", the traces of which can also be found in the name of the Greek mythological hero Bellerophon ("the beast killer"). Skok traces its appearance in Slavic to a possible "Illyrio-Thracian" word *bolauras > blavor. However, Matasovic discards a Thracian source and considers the word to be ultimately of Illyrian origin, with the form *bulauras, leading to an ancient Slavic borrowing with the form *bъla(v)ur.

Due to its inexistence in Bulgarian, Ligorio and Savić reject a Thracian source for the lexeme, and propose another line of borrowing: into Slavic and Romanian via Dalmatian Romance and Balkan Latin. Due to the variation in the attested words, they reconstruct a Latin word *ballaurus for the Romanian balaur and Serbo-Croatian blavor, and a Latin *mallaurus for the other words. This m/b alternation, Ligorio argues, is apparent in some Thracian relicts, like with deity Bendis/Mendis. In the Етимолошки речник српског језика ("Etymological Dictionary of the Serbian Language"), Ligorio geographically separates the reconstructions into areas: *ballaurus and *mallaurus are present in the Western Balkans, the former in the previous territories of the Dalmatae and Illyrians, while the latter in the lands of the Liburnians and the Histri; while only the form *ballaurus is present in the Eastern Balkans.

== Legacy ==
=== Sciences ===
The maniraptor theropod Balaur bondoc is named after this creature.

=== Popular culture ===
==== Video games ====
- In the MMORPG Aion, the Dragons that once ruled the world and are the enemy are called the Balaur.
- In the MMORPG Star Trek Online the largest class of Gorn warship is the Balaur Dreadnought.
- In Ace Combat: Joint Assault, there is a gigantic railgun weapon named the Balaur.
- In the MMORPG Wizard101, the final boss of the Darkmoor expansion is Balaur.

==== Television series ====
In the 2020 TV series Dracula, the Count uses the alias "Mr. Balaur".

== See also ==
- Hydra
- Slavic dragon
- Scholomance
- Solomonari
- Zmeu
