= Slavic dragon =

Legendary creature known as the Zmey in Eastern European folklore

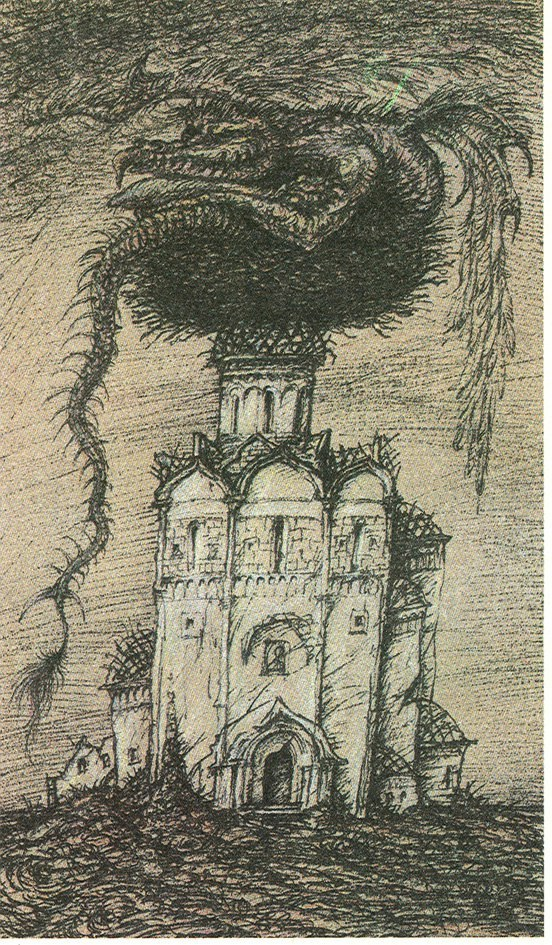
Mikhail Zlatkovsky. Caricature of the revival of paganism in Russia. 1977

A Slavic dragon is any dragon in Slavic mythology, including the Polish żmij, Russian zmei (or zmey; змей), Ukrainian zmiy (змій), and its counterparts in other Slavic cultures (See § Forms below). The physiognomy resembles a combination of the classical dragon and a snake (as a winged serpent), less often depicted with two legs and/or more than one head. Similar representations include the Aztec Quetzalcoatl (Feathered Serpent) or Caduceus (Sumerian symbol of the god Enki borrowed into Greek mythology).

The Romanian zmeu could also be deemed a "Slavic" dragon, but a non-cognate etymology has been proposed.

A zmei may be beast-like or human-like (assuming dragon form in air, human form on ground), sometimes wooing women, but often plays the role of chief antagonist in Russian literature. In the Balkans, the zmei type is overall regarded as benevolent, as opposed to malevolent dragons known variously as lamia, ala or hala, or aždaja.

The Polish smok (e.g. Wawel Dragon of Kraków) or the Ukrainian or Belarusian smok (смок), tsmok (цмок), can also be included. In some Slavic traditions smok is an ordinary snake which may turn into a dragon with age.

Some of the common motifs concerning Slavic dragons include their identification as masters of weather or water sources; that they start life as snakes; and that both the male and female can be romantically involved with humans.

== Nomenclature ==
=== Etymology ===
The Slavic terms descend from Proto-Slavic *zmьjь. The further derivation that Serbo-Croatian zmaj "dragon" and zemlja "earth" ultimately descend from the same Proto-Slavic root zьm-, from the zero grade of Proto-Indo-European *ǵhdem, was proposed by Croatian linguist Petar Skok. (Note: Skok, Petar (1973), Etimologijski rjeinik Hrvatskoga ili Srpskoga jezika, 3, pp. 657–8, Zagreb, Jugoslavenska Akademija Znanosti i Umjetnosti.) Lithuanian scholarship also points out that the connection of the snake (zmey) with the earthly realm is even more pronounced in folk incantations, since its name would etymologically mean 'earthly (being); that which creeps underground'.

The Russian zmei, Ukrainian zmiy may be rendered "serpent", but a "flying serpent" is always implicit, (Note: Belova, O. V. (2012a) "Letaiet’ zmey k lyudyam Литаить змей к людям [A Serpent Flies to People]". Zhivaya Starina Живая старина (1): 24–26 and other sources, apud Kõiva & Boganeva (2020), pp. 389–390) and similarly for the Belarusian zmiej, (Note: Belova, O. V. (2012a) "Letaiet’ zmey k lyudyam Литаить змей к людям [A Serpent Flies to People]". Zhivaya Starina Живая старина (1): 24–26 and other sources, apud Kõiva & Boganeva (2020), pp. 389–390) hence "dragon".

There is dissenting opinion that the Romanian zmeu may not be a loan word from the Slavic zmei group of words, but rather an early borrowing from the Thracian language.

=== Forms ===
The forms and spellings are Russian: zmei or zmey змей (pl. zmei зме́и); Ukrainian: zmiy змій (pl. zmiyi змії); Belarusian: zmiej (змей); Bulgarian: zmei змей (pl. zmeiove змейове; female zmeikinya змейкиня); Polish zmiy żmij (pl. żmije); Serbo-Croatian zmaj змај (pl. зма̀јеви); Slovene: zmaj zmáj or zmàj (pl. zmáji or zmáji), or Macedonian: zmev (змев; pl. zmevovi змевови). the Slovene zmaj, the Slovak drak and šarkan, Czech drak,

== East Slavic zmei ==
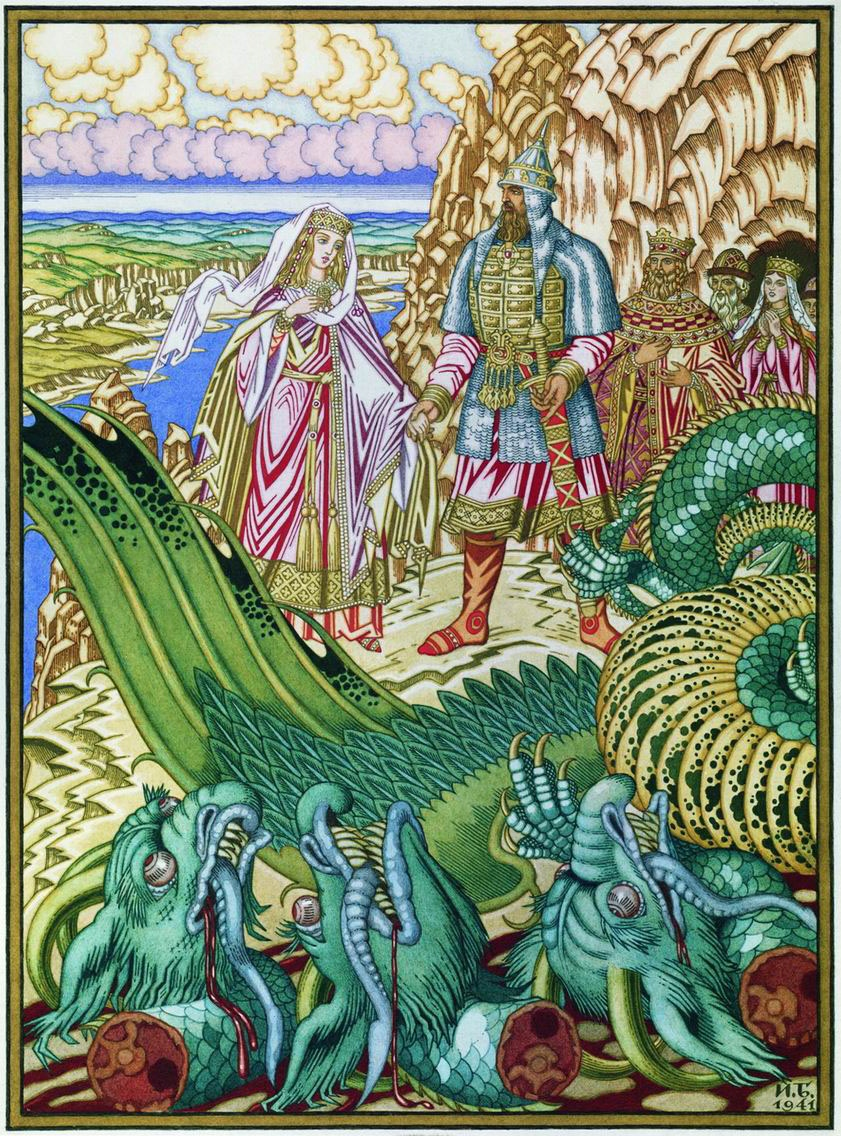
Dobrynya Nikitich rescues Princess Zabava from Zmey Gorynych, by Ivan Bilibin

In the legends of Russia and Ukraine, a particular dragon-like creature, Zmey Gorynych (Russian: Змей Горыныч or Ukrainian: Змій Горинич), has three to twelve heads, and Tugarin Zmeyevich (literally: "Tugarin Dragon-son"), known as zmei-bogatyr or "serpent hero", is a man-like dragon who appears in Russian (or Kievan Rus) heroic literature. The name "Tugarin" may symbolize Turkic or Mongol steppe-peoples.

Both the Russian flying serpent or dragon (змей летающий; zmei letayushchiy) and fiery serpent (Russian: змей Огненный; zmei ognennyi) are considered types of demons, which take on the shape of serpent/dragon in air, and a humanoid on land.

=== Chudo-Yudo ===
The Chudo-Yudo (or Chudo-iudo, чудо-юдо; pl. Chuda-Yuda) is a multi-headed dragon that appears in some wondertale variants, usually considered to be water-dwelling. Some legends portray him as the brother of Koshchey the Deathless, and thus the offspring of the witch Baba Yaga; others present him as a personification of the witch in her foulest form. A Chudo Yudo is one of the guardians of the Water of Life and Death, and his name traditionally was invoked in times of drought. He can apparently assume human-like forms and is able to speak and to ride a horse. He has the ability to regenerate any severed heads.

The term Chudo-Yudo may not be a name for a specific type of dragon at all, but rather a fanciful term for a generic "monster". According to this explanation, the term is to be understood as a poetic form of chudovishche (чудовище) meaning "monster", with a -iudo ending appended simply for the rhyme. Chudo in modern Russian means "a wonder", and once also had the meaning of "a giant"; "yudo" may relate to Iuda, the Russian form of the personal name "Judas", with connotations of uncleanness and the demonic.

Three- and six-headed zmei, slain by the titular hero in "Ivan Popyalov" (Иван Попялов, "Ivan Cinders", Afanasyev's tale #135) appear as six-, nine-, and twelve-headed Chuda-Iuda in the cognate tale #137 "Ivan Bykovich" (Иван Быкович). The inference is that Chudo-Yudo must also be a dragon, even though the word "serpent" (zmei) does not appear explicitly in the latter tale. The six-, nine-, and twelve-headed Chuda-Yuda that appear out of the Black Sea are explicitly described as zmei in yet another cognate tale, #136 "Storm-Bogatyr, Ivan the Cow's Son" (Буря-богатырь Иван коровий сын). The Storm-Bogatyr possesses a magic sword (sword Kladenets), but uses his battle club (or mace) to attack them.

A Chudo-Yudo's head has a healing property: even if severed, he can pick them up and re-attach them with a stroke of his fiery finger, according to one of these tales, comparable to the regenerative power of the Lernaean hydra that grows its head back.

Folktales often depict Chuda-yuda as living beyond the River Smorodina (the name may suggest "Stench River")—that is, in the realm of the dead, reached by crossing over the Kalinov Bridge ("White-hot Bridge").

== Smok ==
The terms smok ("dragon") and tsmok ("sucker") can signify a dragon, but also just an ordinary snake. There are Slavic folk tales in which a smok, when it reaches a certain age, grows into a dragon (zmaj, etc.).

== Some common themes ==
=== Snake into dragons ===
The folklore that an ancient snake grows into a dragon is fairly widespread in Slavic regions. This is also paralleled by similar lore in China. (Note: As Popova (1987), p. 56 points out, the tradition that an ancient snake becomes a dragon is also found in China, recorded for example in the Shuyiji or "Accounts of Strange Things", but in the Chinese version, the snake requires 500 years times 3 for it to evolve into a full dragon. Citation is given to Clébert, Jean Paul (1971) Bestiaire fabuleux, p. 157)

In Russian lore, when the grass snake (уж) or some other serpent, lizard, rooster, or carp achieves certain longevity, such as 9 years or 40 years, it transmutes into a flying zmei.

In Bulgaria is a similar folk belief that the smok ("Aesculapian snake") begins its life-cycle as a non-venomous snake but later grows into a zmei dragon after living 40 years. Or, if the body of a decapitated snake (zmiya) is joined to an ox or buffalo horn, it grows into a lamia after just 40 days, according to Bulgarian folk tradition published by Racho Slaveykov in the 19th century.

There are also among the East Slavic folk the tradition that a viper transforms into a dragon. In Ukrainian folklore the viper needs 7 years to metamorphosize into a dragon, while in Belarusian folklore the requisite time is 100 years, according to one comparison.

The weather-making dragon, ismeju (or zmeu), of Romanian Scholomance folklore is also locally believed to grow out of a snake which has lived for 9 years (belief found at "Hatzeger Thal" or Hațeg).

=== Crossbreeds ===
There are other accounts of how the zmei is engendered. A hen-hatched egg unbeknownst to a human may turn into a zmei (Bulgaria). Or a dragon may be born when a grass snake is swept up by whirlwind (Bulgaria). It is also explained as a cross hybrid between a serpent and grass snake (Macedonia), serpent and ram (Serbia), serpent and a samovila (Macedonia). A woman may conceive a zmei with a serpent (Macedonia), but may suffer a prolonged period of pregnancy.

=== Weather ===
Locally in Ukraine, around Lutsk, the rainbow is called tsmok ("sucker") which is said to be a tube that guzzles water from the sea and rivers and carries the moisture up into the clouds. (Note: Chubinski, P. P. (1872), Trudy Etnografichesko-statisticheskoy ekspeditsii v Zapadno-Russkiy kray, snaryazhennoy Imperatorskim russkim geograficheskim obshchestvom (Yugo-Zapadnyy otdyyel): materialy i izsliyedovaniya Труды Этнографическо-статистической экспедиции в Западно-Русский край, снаряженной Императорским русским географическим обществом (Юго-Западный отдыел): материалы и изслиедования (in Russian), vol. 1, cited by Dragomanov)

There is the notion (thought to be inspired by the tornado) of a Slavic dragon that dips its tail into a river or lake and siphons up the water, ready to cause floods.

In Romanian folklore, dragons are ridden by weather-controlling wizards called the Solomonari. The type of dragon they ride may be the zmeu (Note: Also improperly spelt "ismeju" in this context.) or the balaur, depending on the source.

The lamia and the hala (explained further below) are also generally perceived as weather dragons or demons.

== Balkan Slavic dragons ==
In Bulgarian lore, the zmei is sometimes described as a scale-covered serpent-like creature with four legs and bat's wings, at other times as half-man, half-snake, with wings and a fish-like tail.

In Bulgaria, this zmei tends to be regarded as a benevolent guardian creature, while the lamya and hala were seen as detrimental towards humans. (Note: Kremenliev groups the zmei with the nymphs samodivi and samovili, which he says are winged serpents.)

=== Zmei lovers ===
A flying zmei may appear as a "mythological lover", i.e., a mythical creature behaving as a suitor and lover of human females. A favorite topic of folk songs was the male zmey-lover who may marry a woman and carry her to the underworld, or a female zmeitsa (zmeitza) who falls in love with a shepherd. When a zmei falls in love with a woman, she may "pine, languish, become pale, neglect herself ... and generally act strangely", and the victim stricken with the condition could only be cured by bathing in infusions of certain herbs, according to superstition.

In Serbia, there is the example of the epic song Carica Milica i zmaj od Jastrepca (Serbian: Царица Милица и змај од Јастрепца) and its folktale version translated as "The Tsarina Militza and the Zmay of Yastrebatz".

Zmey of Macedonian fairy tales

In most Macedonian tales and folk songs they are described as extremely intelligent, having hypnotizing eyes. However, sometimes Zmey's could be men who would astrally project into the sky when there is a storm to battle the Lamia, a female evil version that wants to destroy the wheat. They were also known as guardians of the territory, and would even protect the people in it. Hostile behaviour was shown if another zmey comes into his territory. They could change their appearance in the form of a smoke, strong spark, fire bird, snake, cloud but almost afterwards he would gain the form of a handsome man and enter the chambers of a young maiden. They fell in love with women who were conceived on the same night as them, or born in the same day as them. He usually guards the girl from a small age and his love lasts forever. Some girls get sick by loving a zmey, and symptoms include paleness, shyness, antisocial behaviour, watery eyes, quietness and hallucinations. They didn't live a long life, because it resulted in suicide. Zmeys would kidnap girls and lead them into their mountain caves where she would serve him.

=== Benevolent zmei of the Balkans ===
There is a pan-Balkan notion that the zmei (known by various cognates) is a sort of "guardian-spirit dragon" against the "evil" types of dragon, given below. One explanation is that the Balkan zmej symbolized the patriotic dragon fighting the Turkish dragon, a way to vent the local population's frustration at not being able to overthrow the long-time Turkish rule.

=== Zmaj of Serbian fairy tales ===
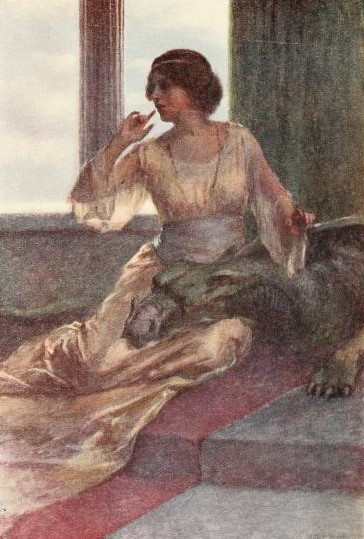
Serbian tale "A Pavilion Neither in the Sky nor on the Earth". —Painting by William Sewell

The zmaj dragon in Serbian fairy tales nevertheless have sinister roles in a number of instances. In the well-known tale "A Pavilion Neither in the Sky nor on the Earth" the youngest prince succeeds in killing the dragon (zmaj) that guards the three princesses held captive. (Note: This tale was set down in writing by Prince Michael Obrenović III based on a childhood tale he heard, and submitted to the folklore collector Vuk Karadžić)

Vuk Karadžić's collection of folktales have other examples. In "The Golden Apple-tree and the Nine Peahens", the dragon carries away the peahen maiden who is the hero's lover. In "Baš Čelik" the hero must contend with a dragon-king.

=== Lamia ===
The lamia or lamya (Bulgarian: ламя), derived from the Greek lamia, is also seen as a dragon-like creature in Bulgarian ethnic population, currently inhabiting Bulgaria, with equivalents in Macedonia (lamja, lamna; ламја), and South-East Serbian areas (lamnia ламња).

The Bulgarian lamia is described as reptile- or lizard-like and covered with scales, with 3–9 heads which are like dog's heads with sharp teeth. It may also have sharp claws, webbed wings, and the scales may be yellow color.

The Bulgarian lamia dwells in the bottoms of the seas and lakes, or sometimes mountainous caverns, or tree holes (Note: To hide from St. Ilya (Elijah)) and can stop the supply of water to the human population, demanding sacrificial offerings to undo its deed. The lamia, bringer of drought, was considered the adversary of St. Ilya (Elijah) or a benevolent zmei.

In the Bulgarian version of Saint George and the Dragon, the dragon was a lamia. Bulgarian legends tell of how a hero (actually a double of St. George, denoted as "George of the Flowers", Cveten Gǝorgi, Bulgarian: цветен Гьорги) cuts off the heads of the three- or multi-headed Lamia, and when the hero accomplishes its destruction and severs all its heads, "rivers of fertility" are said to flow. This song about St. George's fight with the lamia occurs in ritual spiritual verse supposed to be sung around St. George's day. (Note: Marinov's example collected from Veslov was being sung around Christmas but the informant stated that it is supposed be sung on St. George's Day.)

One of the versions collected by ethnologist Dimitar Marinov begins: "Тръгнал ми е цветен Гьорги/Да обиди нивен сънор/На път среща сура ламя.. (George of the Flowers fared out / Going around his congregation /On the road he met the fallow lamia..)". (Note: The adjective sura (сура) has been translated fauve in French by Auguste Dozon, which is rather vague; Oxenford following Dozon, gave the color of the lamia as "fallow".) Another version collected by Marinov substitutes "Yuda-Samodiva" in the place of the lamia. Three rivers gush out of the dragons head-stumps: typically one of corn, one of red wine, and one of milk and honey. These benefitted the crop-growers, vineyard growers (winemakers), and the beekeepers and shepherds, respectively. .

=== Other evil Balkan dragons ===
There is some overlap or conflation of the lamia and the hala (or halla), although the latter is usually conceived of as a "whirlwind". Or it might be described as regional differences. The lamia in Eastern Bulgaria is the adversary of the benevolent zmei, and the hala or ala takes its place in Western Bulgaria.

This motif of hero against the evil dragon (lamia, ala/hala, or aždaja) is found more generally throughout the Balkan Slavic region. Sometimes this hero is a saint (usually St. George). And after the hero severs all its (three) heads, "three rivers of wheat, milk, and wine" flow out of the stumps. (Note: As "rivers of fertility" flows from the slain dragon in the Bulgarian version, as already noted.)

=== Hala ===
The demon or creature known as hala (or ala), whose name derived from the Greek word for "hail" took the appearance of a dense mist or fog, or a black cloud. Hala was believed to be the cause of strong winds and whirlwind in Eastern Bulgaria, whereas the lamya was blamed as the perpetrator in Southwestern Bulgarian lore. In Western Bulgarian tradition, the halla itself was regarded as the whirlwind, which guarded clouds and contained the rain, but was also regarded as a type of dragon, alongside the folklore that the smok (roughly equated with "grass snake" but actually the Aesculapian snake (Note: Smok was crudely translated as "grass snake" by Zhelyazkova, but grass snake (Natrix spp.) in Bulgarian is actually vodnitsa водница or vodna zmiya водна змия literally 'water snake'.)) was a crag-dwelling whirlwind.

These hala were also known in East and Central Serbia. Similar lore occur in Croatia, Bosnia and Herzegovina, and Montenegro.

=== Aždaja ===
The demon hala was also called by other names regionally, in some parts of Bulgaria they were known as aždarha (Bulgarian: аждарха) or ažder (аждер), in Macedonian as aždaja or ažder (аждаја, аждер), in Bosnian and Serbian as aždaja (аждаја). (Note: Or aždraja (аждраја).)

The word aždaja or aždaha is borrowed from Persian azdahā (اژدها), and has its origins in the Indo-Iranian mythology surrounding the dragon azidahā. As an example, in some local Serbian icons, St. George is represented as slaying the aždaja and not a zmaj.

=== Pozoj ===
A pozoj is a dragon of legends in Croatia. (Note: Vatroslav Jagić for one seemed to equate pazoj with lintvern.) In Međimurje County, the Čakovec pozoj was said to dwell beneath the city, with its head under the church and tail under the town square, or vice versa, and it could only be gotten rid of by a grabancijaš (a "wandering scholar", glossed as a "black [magic] student").

The pozoj is also known in Slovenia, and according to legend there is one living underneath Zagreb, causing an earthquake whenever it shrugs. Poet Matija Valjavec (1866) has published some tales concerning the pozoj in the Slovenski glasnik magazine, which also connected the creature to the črne škole dijak ("black school student"), which other Slovene sources call črnošolec ("sorcerer's apprentice"), and which some equate with a grabancijaš dijak

Dragons in Slovenia are generally negative in nature, and usually appear in relation with St. George. The Slovene god-hero Kresnik is known as a dragonslayer.

== Representations ==
Coat of arms of Moscow

There are natural and man-made structures that have dragon lore attached to them. There are also representations in sculpture and painting. In iconography, Saint George and the Dragon is prominent in Slavic areas. The dragon is a common motif in heraldry, and the coat of arms of a number of cities or families depict dragons.

The Dragon Bridge (Slovene: Zmajski most) in Ljubljana, Slovenia depicts dragons associated with the city or said to be the city's guardians, and the city's coat of arms features a dragon (representing the one slain by Kresnik).

The coat of arms of Moscow also depicts a St George (symbolizing Christianity) killing the Dragon (symbolizing the Golden Horde).

Some prehistoric structures, notably the Serpent's Wall near Kyiv, have been associated with dragons as symbols of foreign peoples.

=== In popular culture ===
- Ilya Muromets (1956 film), Zmey Gorynych, or as 'Zuma the Fire Dragon' in the English version.
- Dobrynya Nikitich& (1965 animation, Soyuzmultfilm)
- Čardak ni na nebu ni na zemlji ("A Pavilion Neither in the Sky nor on the Earth", 1978 animation)

== See also ==
Coats of arms of Ljubljana

- Chuvash dragon – Legendary winged fire-breathing and shape-shifting creature in Chuvash legends
- Smok Wawelski – dragon of Kraków
- Krepel – dragon of Bytom
- Zahhak (or Aži Dahāka) – Iranian dragon
- žaltys – Lithuanian mythological serpent
- zduhać – Legendary creature in Balkan folklore
- Zilant – dragon of Kazan
- Zirnitra – Wendish dragon and god of sorcery
- Dobrynya Nikitich and Zmey Gorynych (2006 animated feature film)
- Mavrud wine - story of a lion or lamya defeated by hero
- Coats of arms of Ljubljana
- Serpent's Wall, according to a legend, plowed by a dragon
