= Solomonari =

Weather-controlling wizards in Romanian folklore

The Solomonar or Șolomonar (German phonetization: Scholomonar; plural Solomonari) is a wizard believed in Romanian folklore to ride a dragon (zmeu (Note: Ismeju is the German phoneticization of zmeu.) or a balaur) and control the weather, causing rain, thunder, or hailstorm.

They are recruited from common folk and taught their magic at the Solomonărie or Şolomanţă (German phonetization: Scholomance).

== General description ==
The Solomonars are said to be tall, red-haired, wearing long white robes of peasants, sometimes woolen, or clad in ragged attire made from patches, a small version of a Semantron, which serves to summon the Vântoase (alternatively the winds are contained in a little wooden jar). When not helping the Devil, they are most often seen around begging for alms, and the collected coins are then thrown into rivers, as offerings to the water spirits. The contents of their magic bag are instruments such as an iron axe used as lightning rod (also as a wand to summon them or his mount), birchbark reins or a golden bridle, and a book of wisdom which contained all their knowledge, and is the source of their power. A branch that has killed a snake is included in some lists. Once they are in the guise of beggars (often crippled or blindfolded beggars), they blend in with the populace so they cannot be distinguished as wizards. However, they apparently have the knowledge and memory of which peasant's farm deserves his retribution when he acts as a dragon-rider sending down his hailstorm.

=== Schooling ===
The Solomonari, by some accounts, are recruited from the people. They are taught their magic and the speech of beasts at the school (Scholomance), and become capable of riding the dragons. Tradition says they became the Devil's students, either being instructed by him, or becoming a servant to his commands.

An additional belief was that the students were taught at the Devil's school which was situated underground, and that the students avoided the rays of the sun for the seven-year duration of their study. They were in fact a type of Strigoi or Vampire, according to S. F. Marian, who collected the folklore from the field. (Note: Marian adds here the belief that the strigoi, like the vampire avoided eating garlic or having contact with it. And had to be buried faced down with garlic in its mouth to prevent him resurrecting and causing mischief.)

=== Dragon-riders and weather ===
The solomonari were regarded as dragon-riders who control the weather, causing thunder, or rain, or hail to fall.

One way in which this belief was articulated (Note: Folklore given by Wilhelm Schmidt and Emily Gerard's version.) was that a particular pupil out of the graduating class of ten would be selected by the Devil to become the designated Weather-maker (German: Wettermacher) who rode the "Ismeju" dragon (German phoneticization of zmeu dragon). Or he became the "Devil's aide-de-camp" who rode the zmeu to make thunderbolts. Or thirdly, the Solomonariu would fly up into the skies, and whenever his dragon glanced at the clouds, rainfall would come. (Note: In this version, it is written as if only the designated student retained by the devil earned the name Solomonariu.) But God intervened to keep the dragon from growing too weary, lest it plummeted and devour a great part of the earth.

A rather different presentation is that Solomonari who normally lived as beggars among the populace would occasionally engage himself for a fee to become the dragon-rider and hail-bringer. He selected which fields to damage, knowing which peasants behaved unkindly to them. A peasant may hire a "counter-Solomonari" (Romanian: contrasolomonar; pl. Contra-Solomonarĭ) (Note: »Gegen-Solomonarĭ« (pl.).) to cast spells to divert the dragon-riding Solomonari.

In this version, the type of dragon they rode were the balauri (sing. balaur). This dragon can be brought out of a bottomlessly deep lake by using "golden reins" or bridle (German: ein goldene Zaum"; Romanian: un frâu de aur), and the wizard and dragon would create storms or bring down hail.

== 19th century sources ==
"Scholomance" and "Scholomonariu" appeared in print in the Austrian journal Österreichische Revue in 1865, written by Wilhelm Schmidt (1817–1901) The piece is discussed as a belief present in the Central Romanian Fogarasch (Făgăraș) district and beyond, with additional lore from Hermannstadt.

Emily Gerard later wrote on the topic of "Scholomance", although she only referred to its attendees as "scholars", and did not specifically employ the term Solomanari or the equivalent.

Romanian ethnobotanist Simion Florea Marian described the Solmonari in his article on "Daco-Romanian Mythology" in the Albina Carpaților (1879). Marian collected this folklore orally from the people in Siebenbürgen (Transylvania) and the adjoining Bukovina-Moldavia region.

== Nomenclature ==
Solomonar is the singular form, and the variant Șolomonar (Note: As well as alternating the initial consonant between s /s/ and ş /ʃ/, earlier reflexes of the word in Romanian may add "-i" and the regular "-u" formerly found in the noun declension.) also listed. The German phonetization Scholomonar which is closer to the latter form was given by Gaster.

The modern-day dictionary plural form in Romanian is Solomonari, and "solomonars" in the plural has been used in English translation.

An old dictionary form in the plural Șolomonariu occurs in a lexicon published in 1825, where the term is glossed as Latin: imbriciter, (Note: Latin: imber, "rain".) Hungarian: garabantzás deák, and German: der Wettermacher, Wettertreiber, Lumpenmann. Andrei Oișteanu remarked that this form is rather dated.

Scholomonáriu is defined as Zauberer or "sorcerers" in an even earlier source, a glossary appended to a book dating from 1781.

== Etymologies ==
The default explanation is that the word is connected to King Solomon via the addition of the occupational suffix "-ar", although this may be folk etymology. A folkloric account attests to the association with the biblical king. In an account given by Friedrich von Müller the "Kaiser Salomo" has the ability to control the weather, and the inheritors of his art are called "Scholomonar". The association of Solomon with wizards may have been popularized by the adventure tale Solomon and Morcolf.

Gaster, more complicatedly, suggested a hybrid of the word for the magic school Scholomantze (Romanian orthography: Şolomanţă) from association with Salamanca, and Solomonie (from Solomon). An alternate derivation from the German Schulmänner ("scholars"), in reference to the popular belief that solomonars attended a school, is credited to J. Vulcan. (Note: Or derive from German Schule "school".)

=== Zeus hypothesis ===
King Solomon as weather-maker may derive from the Greek myth of Zeus the king of gods controlling the weather, a theory proposed by A. Oișteanu

=== Red Jews hypothesis ===
As the Solomonari have been described as red-haired giants (Romanian: uriaşi, pl.), a connection to them and the legendary Red Jews (evreilor roşii (Note: Correct form "evreii roșii"; unclear if the term "evreilor roşii" is widely circulate in Romania, but is used by Majuru to translate "Red Jews" in Koestler's book.)) has been suggested by Adrian Majuru. This hypothesis builds on Lazăr Șăineanu's theory that giant/Jews in Romanian folklore derived from the historical Khazars, and Arthur Koestler bringing the notion of the "Red Jews" into that formulation (Koestler's The Thirteenth Tribe, the ultimate source being A. N. Poliak's book on the Khazars in Hebrew).

=== Dacian ascetics hypothesis ===
Similarity with the Geto-Dacian ascetics called the ktistai described by Strabo was noted by Traian Herseni (d. 1980) who hypothesized that they were the original Solomonari. Herseni posited that the ktisai were more properly called "skistai" meaning "those who abstain from worldly pleasures", and that the cryptic byname that Strabo gave them Kapnobatai (which literally means "smoke-treaders") really meant "travelers in the clouds".

The theory has found its strong proponent in Eugen Agrigoroaiei, who pronounced that the origins of the Solomonari had been established, and the Dacian cloud travelers must have been authentic Solomonari. Andrei Oișteanu cautions that while "enticing", the "hypothesis remains as only as plausibility". (Note: Romanian: "ipoteza este spectaculoasă şi ispititoare"; "această ipoteză să rămână doar plauzibilă".) He points out that a tradition kept alive from Caesar's time to the 19th century presents a credibility issue, since there is a complete vacuum in the records about any of it for the 1900-year interim. Mihai Coman is another skeptic who referred to the idea as "speculation by Herseni".

== Parallels and synonyms ==
Parallels with the legend of the Serbo-Croatian garabancijaš dijak (Hungarian: garabonciás diák) "necromantic scholar" had been sought in Moses Gaster's paper, which is one a major source for the Solomanari folkloristics. The Croatian version was described by Vatroslav Jagić and the Hungarian version by Oszkár Asbóth.

A number of synonyms can be found in Romanian, including "zgrimințeș", and it is considered synonymous or closely connected to the widespread Balkan legend known in Serbo-Croatian (for example) as grabancijaš dijak ("the necromancy student").

== Anecdotes ==
Friedrich von Müller (1857) reported a story from Schäßburg (Sighișoara in Transylvania) in which a Romanian mistook a robed student for a solomonar.
