= Scholomance =

Folkloric Romanian school of black magic

The Scholomance (Note: In German, the pronunciation is equivalent to "Scholomantze".) (Romanian: Șolomanță [ʃoloˈmantsə], Solomonărie [solomonəˈri.e]) was a fabled school of black magic in Romania, especially in the region of Transylvania. Folkloric accounts state that the Devil himself ran it. The school enrolled about ten students to become the Solomonari. Courses taught included the speech of animals and magic spells. The Devil chose one of the graduates to be the Weathermaker and tasked with riding a dragon to control the weather.

The school was underground, and the students remained unexposed to sunlight for the seven years of their study. According to some accounts, the dragon (zmeu or balaur) was kept submerged in a mountaintop lake south of Sibiu.

== Folklore ==
An early source on the Scholomance and Dracula folklore was the article "Transylvanian Superstitions" (1885), written by Scottish expatriate Emily Gerard. It has been established for certain this article was an important source that Bram Stoker consulted for his novel Dracula. (Note: In an interview with Jane Stoddard, Stoker is quoted as saying ".. I learned a good deal from E. Gerard's 'Essays on Roumanian Superstitions' [sic.] which first appeared in The Nineteenth Century, and were afterwards published in a couple of volumes".) Gerard also published similar material in Land Beyond the Forest (1888), which Stoker might have also read, and other commentators stated this was Stoker's direct source for Scholomance in his novel.

Twenty years earlier, a description of the Scholomance and its pupils (the Scholomonariu) was given in an article written by Wilhelm Schmidt (1817–1901), a Transylvanian Saxon historian then teaching in Hermannstadt (Sibiu).

Some modern commentators have referred to the school as "L'École du Dragon" or "The School of the Dragon".

=== Curriculum ===
The school, it was believed, recruited a handful of pupils from the local population. Enrollment could be 7, 10, or 13 pupils. Here they learned the language of all living things, (Note: or just "language of animals".) the secrets of nature, and magic. Some sources add specifically the pupils were instructed on how to cast magic spells, ride flying dragons, and control the rain.

The duration of their study was seven or nine years, and the final assignment for graduation required the copying of one's entire knowledge of humanity into a "Solomonar's book".

There was also the belief that the Devil instructed at the Scholomance. (Note: Schmidt only acknowledges this was a firmly held belief in Hermannstadt. But Gaster presents it as something generally held.) Moses Gaster remarked that this association with the Devil indicates that the memory of the school's origins as having to do with King Solomon had faded entirely.

=== Location ===
The Scholomance, according to Gerard, was at some unspecified location deep in the mountains, but the dragon (spelled in Romanian as zmeu, though given as ismeju) was stabled underwater in a small mountaintop lake south of modern Sibiu, Romania. Stoker's novel locates the Scholomance near a non-existent "Lake Hermannstadt".

The Solomonărie, as the Romanians called it, was situated underground, according to Romanian folklorist Simion Florea Marian. Students there shunned sunlight for the seven-year duration of their training. (Note: Marian depicts these students as evil folk, a sort of strigoi (vampire).)

=== Weathermaker ===
By some accounts, one of the 10 graduating students would be chosen by the Devil to be the Weathermaker (German: Wettermacher) and to ride a dragon (zmeu in Romanian) in this errand; every time the dragon glanced at the clouds, rainfall would come. But according to legend, Goensuredre the dragon would not weary, because if it plummeted, it would devour a great part of the earth. The Solomonari's dragon-mount was, however, a balaur according to Marian's account.

=== Origins ===
Scholomance is a Germanization, Solomonărie was the Romanian form according to the popular beliefs collected by Marian, and an alternate Șolomanțâ is given elsewhere.

These forms suggest a tie to King Solomon, and it has been pointed out that one account in folklore describes the Solomonari as disciples of the weather-controlling ways of Solomon. Additionally, some assimilation might have occurred with Salamanca, Spain, the famed city of learning, with medieval stories of a sorcery taught by the devil located in the Cueva de Salamanca. (Note: Moses Gaster's observation was the first (Gaster (1884), p. 283), according to Oișteanu.) (Note: Charles Godfrey Leland (1891) also pointed this out.)

==== History of the Germanized form ====
Scholomance has been suspected of not being a genuine Romanian term, but rather a misnomer, created through the corrupted Germanization of "Solomonari", the term for the students and not the school. Such a view was given by Elizabeth Miller, a scholar specializing in Dracula studies.

A mistaken idea that "Scholomance" was a neologism first reported in 1885 by Emily Gerard was at one time current in English-speaking circles. (Note: For instance, Elizabeth Miller writes that Gerard must have been the first to publish the word Scholomance. Occult writer Rosemary Guiley stated it was "possible that Gerard garbled another term she heard, as she probably did with the word Nosferatu".) The terms "Scholomance" and "Scholomonariu" appear in the Austrian journal Österreichische Revue in 1865. (Note: Also, "Scholomonáriu", a Germanization of Solomonari is found glossed in a German book published 1781.)

== In fiction ==
Bram Stoker, who studied Gerard's work extensively, refers to it twice in Dracula (1897), once in chapter 18:

The Draculas were, says Arminius, a great and noble race, though now and again were scions who were held by their coevals to have had dealings with the Evil One. They learned his secrets in the Scholomance, amongst the mountains over Lake Hermanstadt, where the devil claims the tenth scholar as his due.

And in chapter 23:

He dared even to attend the Scholomance, and there was no branch of knowledge of his time that he did not essay.

Stoker's reference to "Lake Hermanstadt" appears to be a misinterpretation of Gerard's passage, as there is no body of water by that name. The part of the Carpathians near Hermannstadt holds Păltiniş Lake and Bâlea Lake, which host popular resorts for people of the surrounding area.

In the fantasy novel Lord of Middle Air by Michael Scott Rohan, the character of wizard Michael Scot reveals that he dared to train at the Scholomance on two occasions, as there was so much knowledge it could not all be learnt in one night.

The novel Anno Dracula by Kim Newman cites the same quotation from Stoker's Dracula in chapter 23.

The young adult fiction novel Lady Midnight by Cassandra Clare uses the Scholomance as a Shadowhunter training academy to train elite Shadowhunters in her spinoff to The Mortal Instruments, The Dark Artifices.

The novel A Deadly Education by Naomi Novik is the first in a series primarily set in a boarding school for young wizards inspired by and named for the legendary Scholomance.

The warlocks in Bungie's Myth II: Soulblighter are described as having been trained at a school of magic named the Scholomance.

In Blizzard Entertainment's World of Warcraft, the Scholomance is a ruined castle held by undead forces whose cellars and crypts are now used to train necromancers and create undead monsters. Like its legendary namesake, the Scholomance in World of Warcraft is in the middle of a lake. The school is also featured in the Scholomance Academy expansion pack of 2020, for the related game Hearthstone and in the Warcraft universe.

== See also ==
- Domdaniel
- Sæmundr fróði attended the Black School according to Scandinavian folklore.
