= Ligorio =

Ligorio is a surname. Notable people with the surname include:

- Ligorio López (1933–1993), Mexican footballer
- Loren Ligorio (born 1955), Croatian painter
- Orsat Ligorio (born 1985), Croatian and Serbian linguist
- Pirro Ligorio (c. 1512/1513-1583), Italian architect, painter and antiquarian
