= Verea Viteazul =

Verea Viteazul is a character of Romanian folklore, a powerful and courageous hero, and the elder brother of Ileana Cosânzeana.

== Role in folktales ==
He appears as the main character in Romanian fairy tale "Chiperi Viteazul lumii, Verea Viteazul and Mucha-far-de-moarte" (first published in 1901) by Alexandru Vasiliu, in Moldavian folk tale "Verea-Viteazul" (published in the scientific collection "Genuri si specii folkloristice", by Chisinau "Stiinta", in 1972), and in tale "Fat-Frumos and Verea Viteazul", first published in 1973 in a compilation by author and folklorist Grigore Botezatu. All of them are based on ancient folk Romanian traditions and legends.

All these tales, with some variations, describe a single plot: having shot three pigeons on a hunt, Verea Viteazul rests under a huge tree with his horse and his dogs and lights a fire to fry the pigeons. He then hears from the tree the voice of an old woman who complains that she is cold. Verea Viteazul invites her to go down to the fire to warm up. The old woman gives him three hairs and tells him to throw them on his horse and his dogs. After he throws the hairs, she goes down barefooted to the fire with frogs on a spit and strives to touch his pigeons. Verea Viteazul demands that she not spoil his food, but the old woman replies that those who fry pigeons should eat frogs, and those who fry frogs should eat pigeons. Verea Viteazul pushes her away from the fire. Then the hairs turn into chains and bind his horse and dogs, and the old woman grows over him as a monster and, threatening to strangle him, tells him not to move. In punishment, the old hag rips open his belly, takes out the intestines, heart and kidneys, and instead stuffs his belly with horse dung or wood rot. The old hag takes Verea Viteazul’s viscera to her house on the top of a tree, heals his ripped open belly with magic water, and before releasing him, she says that if he tells someone about what happened, he will die immediately. Verea Viteazul returns to his palace.

== Interpretations ==
In his work "Die rumänische Mädchen-Spinnstube und ihre Parallelen im Zaubermärchen", German explorer Hans Fink draws an analogy between the old hag on the tree and the famous German folk character Perchta or Frau Bercht. In turn, Romanian-Spanish scholar Angela Castineira Ionescu, in her work "Contribución al conocimiento de la estructura de los cuentos tradicionales románticos: el héroe en el cuento popular rumano", points to her perverted sexual fetishism.

== Selected bibliography ==
- Vasiliu, Al.: "Povesti". Editura tineretului. Bucureşti, I960.
- Botezatu Grigore: "Făt-Frumos şi Soarele". Poveşti populare din Basarabia. Bucureşti: Editura Minerva, 1995.
- Hans Fink: "Die rumänische Mädchen-Spinnstube und ihre Parallelen im Zaubermärchen". Memoria ethnologica nr.56-57* iulie-decembrie 2015.
- Ángela Castiñeira Ionescu. "Contribución al conocimiento de la estructura de los cuentos tradicionales románticos: el héroe en el cuento popular rumano". Departamento de Filologia Romanica Facultad de Filologia Universidad Complutense de Madrid 1983.
- "Genuri şi specii folcloristice"; Chişinau, «Stiinta» 1972.
