= Ctistae =

Celibate Mysian group known to Strabo

The Ctistae or Ktistai (Greek: κτίσται) were an ascetic group or class among the ancient Mysians.

The Mysians avoided consuming any living thing, and therefore lived on such foodstuffs as milk and honey. For this reason, they were referred to as "god-fearing" and "capnobatae" (kapnobatai) or "smoke-treading".

The Ctistae not only observed these dietary restrictions, but abstained from cohabitating with women. They led celibate lives, never marrying. They were held in a place of honor by the Thracians, with their lives being dedicated to the gods. They are described by Strabo, sourcing Poseidonius.

According to Strabo, whether they took up celibacy or not they were collectively called Hippemolgi (Ἱππημολγοί; "mare-milkers"), Galactophagi (Γαλακτοφάγοι; "living on milk") or Abii (ἄβιοι, "not living (with women)").

== Comparative analysis ==
Strabo, in the same section notes that the Greeks confounded the Mysians with the Getae (or Geto-Dacians).

That the Ctistae described by Strabo might be equivalent to the Polistai among the Dacians mentioned by Josephus in the Antiquities of the Jews Book 18, Chapter 1 paragraph 5 has been noted early on by Scaliger (d. 1609). He conjectured that some of the ascetics lived in groups and lived in buildings, hence the distinction of being called Polistai "City-Dwellers".
