= Ileana Cosânzeana =

Mythological figure

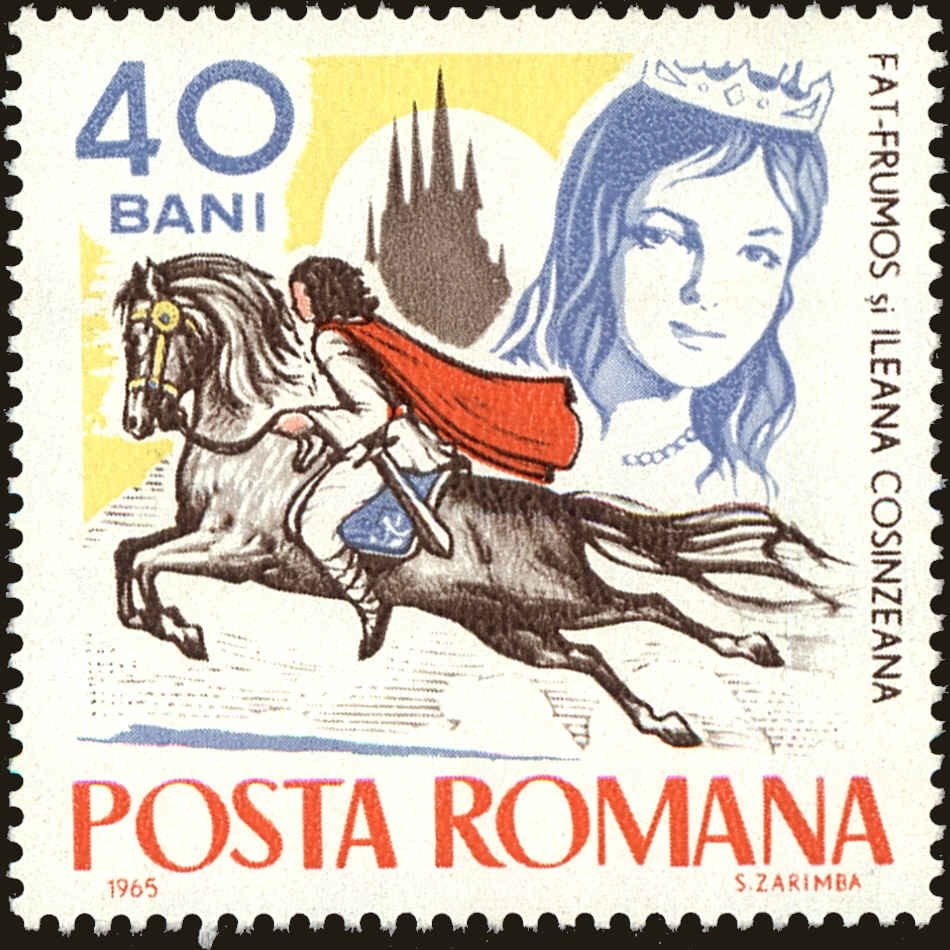
Romanian stamp with Făt-Frumos and Ileana Cosânzeana

Ileana Cosânzeana is a figure in Romanian mythology. She is represented as a beautiful and good-natured princess or daughter of an Emperor, or described as a fairy with immense powers.

== Names ==
According to professor Nina Cuciuc, her name can also be translated or written as the following: Cosînzeana, Cosenzeana, Sânziana, Sînziana, Ileana Kossinzana, Hélène Cossinzana and Ileana Cosînzeana Sora Soarelui ("Sister of the Sun"). She can also be described as "Queen of Flowers".

According to Adela Ileana Draucean, the name Ileana derives from Elena, and cosânzeana is linked to sânziană, a Romanian holiday and another term to designate fairies in Romanian mythology.

Folklorist Lazar Saineanu translated her name into French as Hélène aux cheveux d'or (sic) ("Helen with Golden Hair").

Romanian linguist Sorin Paliga also lists several alternate names for the character: Ileana Simziana, Floarea Florilor ("the Flower of Flowers"); Frumoasa lumii ("The Beauty of the World"); Zâna dobrozâna (zână, from Latin Diana, meaning 'fairy', and, according to him, the Slavic word dobr 'good'). She is sometimes called Rora and Rozuna, which, according to Paliga, contains the word for "dew", which - he argues - connects her to a dawn and vegetation deity. Another theory proposes partial origin from a Late Latin Constantiana, perhaps influenced by the Greek pronunciation *Cosandiana. This may be due to an association with Saint Helena, the mother of the emperor Constantine the Great, later influenced by sânziană and associated with fairies.

== In folklore ==
In Romanian folklore, Ileana is the original concept of feminine beauty, the most beautiful amongst the fairies: her eyes look like the sun, her body is like the sea, and her garments are made of flowers. Pearls and gold flow out of her mouth when she sings. She is also said to use her power of white magic to heal or revive. Ileana Cosânzeana signifies the most poetic imagination of Romanian genius. She personifies the beauty, the youth, and the angelic soul, in one word, the perfection of humanity. She is a mythical character with supernatural powers and with symbolic features. Ileana Cosânzeana succeeds in defeating the evil forces because she is brave, smart, modest and diligent.

=== Ileana as the moon ===
Ileana Cosanzeana is "the girl with golden hair and azure eyes" and, argues professor Adela Ileana, represents the "female counterpart" to "the solar male archetype": Prince Făt-Frumos. On the other hand, several scholars argue for a lunar aspect of Ileana Cosanzeana, also due to her possible etymology that connects her to the Roman goddess Diana.

The moon is also said to have been worshipped as Ileana Sanziana. Romanian folklorist Marcu Beza stated that the moon appears as the Sister of the Sun in "a popular" Romanian Christmas carol (colinda), and also in a ballad of Transylvania.

In a legend collected by Tereza Stratilesco, the sun wants to marry, but cannot find a suitable wife. He sights a group of nine maidens, including Ileana Simziana, "the sister of the sun". She tries to dissuade him to marry his own sister by setting difficult tasks for him. Meanwhile, Ileana blesses herself with the sign of the cross and dives into the sea, becoming a barbel. The sun orders fishermen to get her, but they only find the fish. Saints take pity on her, take her off the sea and to see Adam and Eve, who "polish her" and name her "Luna". God sets her as the counterpart of the sun.

Beza also reported a version of the story collected by fellow folklorist G. Dem. Teodorescu, where the moon tries to stall the wedding by asking the Sun to create an iron bridge over the Black Sea and a ladder to the sky.

=== Similar characters ===
Romanian folklorist Lazar Saineanu compared Romanian Ileana Cosanzeana to Albanian Bukura e dheut ("Beauty of the Earth") and the Hungarian Tündér Ilona ("Fairy Elena").

== In tales ==
In some tales "Ileana Cosânzeana" is the fairy of the Spring flowers, who gives each flower its perfume, although she also has the power to take it back. The elves love her, as do the flowers; even the wind loves Ileana, but he can never catch her. In the myth, she is a beautiful princess kidnapped by the Zmeu (a Dragon equivalent), who locks her in his castle and waits for her to give in to his marriage proposal. She is saved by Făt-Frumos, who is analogous to Prince Charming. Făt-Frumos is tested by many trials as he makes his way to Ileana Cosânzeana. Finally, he fights the Zmeu, beats him, and frees Ileana Cosânzeana. They both live happily ever after.

Ileana Cosânzeana is, in some tales, described to have an elder brother – Verea Viteazul.

In the tale Ileana Cosânzana, din cosita floarea-i canta, noua imparatii asculta ("Ileana Cosanzeana, the Flower that she Has in Her Braided Hair is Singing, Nine Kingdoms are Listening"), princess Ileana Cosanzeana is associated with music by the way of a magical flower that produces heavenly songs.

== Related characters ==
Another similarly named fairy maiden exists in Romanian folklore: Iana Sanziana (ro). According to Adela Ileana, they cannot be confused for each other, despite some similarities: both are indeed fairies, but Iana is a celestial or astral character, while Ileana Cosanzeana is "a human, chthonic one". Iana also shows features of a solar character, being the sister of the sun.

== See also ==
- Princess and dragon
- Dragonslayer
- Ileana Simziana
- List of Romanian fairy tales
