= Făt-Frumos =

Heroic character from Romanian folklore

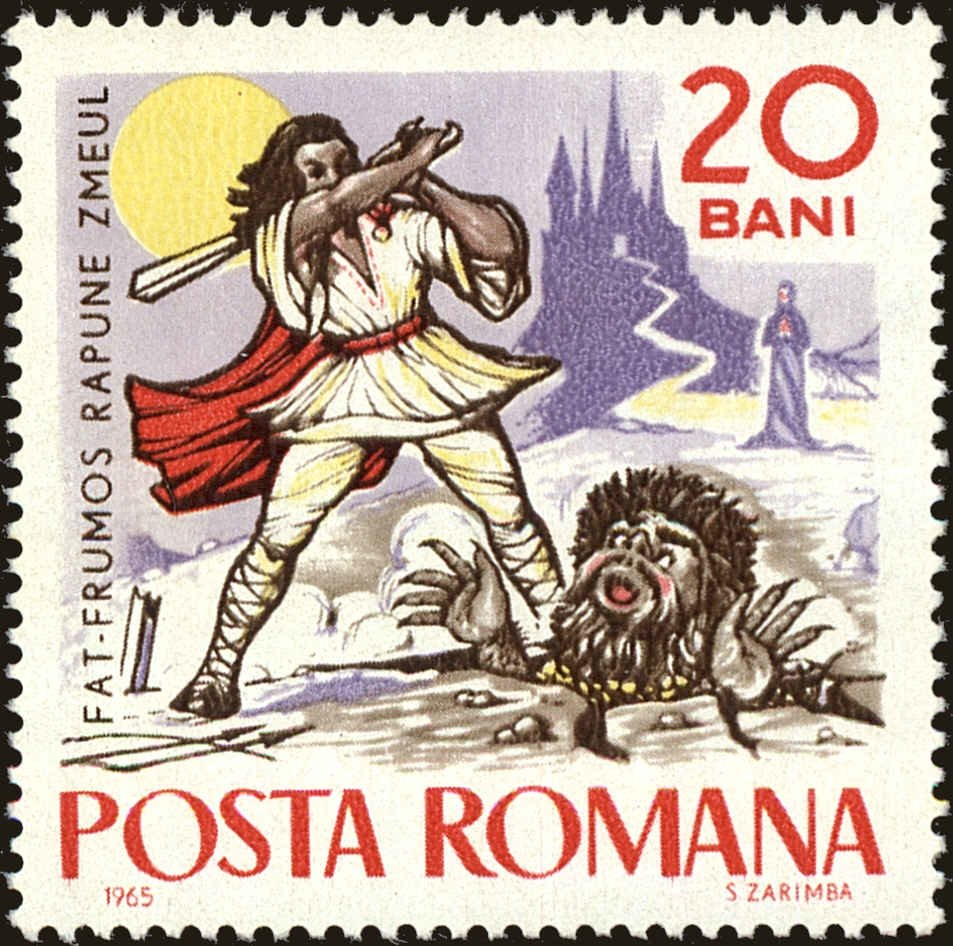
Romanian stamp depicting Făt-Frumos slaying zmeu

Făt-Frumos (from Romanian făt: boy; frumos: handsome) is a knight hero in Romanian folklore, as exemplified in the fairy tale Făt-Frumos with the Golden Hair.

Făt-Frumos has to go through tests and obstacles that surpass ordinary men's power. With dignity, he always brings these to a positive resolution. He fights demonic monsters and malevolent characters (zmeu, balaur, Muma Pădurii, etc.). He travels in both "this land" and "the other land" (tarâmul celălalt) on the calul năzdrăvan ("magical horse"), who also serves as his counsellor.

Akin to Prince Charming, he possesses such essential attributes as courage, purity, justness, physical and spiritual strength, cleverness, passion, and unshakable love. Făt-Frumos also displays some minimal abilities in performing miracles, as well as total commitment to a task once his word is given and to the monarch he serves. In some tales, he is so precocious as to be able to weep before he is born. Făt-Frumos is usually the youngest son of a king. In the Romanian folk stories it is common that all the sons of a king try to defeat the Zmeu or the Balaur, the older sons failing before the younger one succeeds.

At the end of the fairy tale, Făt-Frumos is paired up with the heroine of the story, a fairy maiden: Ileana Cosânzeana, Zâna Zânelor (Fairy Queen) or Doamna Chiralina (Lady Chiralina).

In his journeys, Făt-Frumos often has to overcome a major dilemma related to the correct route he is to follow, and is bound to decide between two equally nonsensical choices. Asked about the right way, an old woman gives Făt-Frumos an obscure answer: "If you turn right, you will be in sorrow; if you turn left, you will be in sorrow as well".

According to Victor Kernbach, this lose-lose situation evokes the historical condition of the Romanian people whose homeland had been constantly crossed and attacked by foreign powers, as the native population was always forced to decide between two equally unfortunate choices: ally with your enemies or fight them.

Făt-Frumos is also a commonplace figure of the Romanian culture and literature. He appears as a character in stories and poems by famous writers, such as Mihai Eminescu, Tudor Arghezi, or Nichita Stănescu. As a symptom of the Romanian people's self-irony, Făt-Frumos can be encountered even in contemporary Romanian jokes, yet less frequently than Bulă or the political personalities of the moment.

== See also ==
- Ileana Cosânzeana
- Princess and dragon
- Dragonslayer

== Selected bibliography ==
- Calinescu, Matei. "Between History and Paradise: Initiation Trials". In: The Journal of Religion 59, no. 2 (1979): 218–23. www.jstor.org/stable/1202705.
- Chelaru, Oana Valeria. "Sistemul actanţial al basmului" [Actantial System of the Folktale]. In: Anuarul Muzeului Etnografic al Moldovei [The Yearly Review of the Ethnographic Museum of Moldavia]. 11/2011. pp. 87-116. (In Romanian)
- Frîncu, Simina & Giurginca, Ioana. (2019). Făt-Frumos cu ceas rupt din Soare. Folclorul românesc și astronomia. In: Astronomia străbunilor. Arheoastronomie și etnoastronomie pe teritoriul României, Publisher: JATEPress Kiadó, pp. 345–362.
- (in Romanian) Kernbach, Victor (1989). Dicționar de mitologie generală. Editura Științifică și Enciclopedică, București, pp. 183–184.
