= Domdaniel =

Fictional cavernous undersea hall

Domdaniel is a fictional cavernous hall at the bottom of the ocean where evil magicians, spirits, and gnomes meet.

== Overview ==
Domdaniel was first mentioned in the continued story of the Arabian Nights by Dom Chaves and Cazotte (1788–1793). It was described as being located in the sea near Tunis. In this hall, the ruler Zatanai held his court, which included the magician Maugraby and his students.

Robert Southey later used Domdaniel in his multi-volume oriental poem Thalaba the Destroyer (1797). The hero of Southey's story, Thalaba, is the son of Hodeirah and the last surviving member of his family. It had been prophesied that the spirits of the Domdaniel were destined to be destroyed by a member of that family, so they sought to put an end to it.

One of the magicians named by Southey as dwelling in Domdaniel was Abdaldar. He was selected by lot to hunt down Thalaba and slay him. But the youth Thalaba accomplishes the destruction of the magicians in the final volume of the poem despite their efforts to kill him and his surviving family.

Nathaniel Hawthorne used Domdaniel in his romance The House of the Seven Gables: "Hepzibah put her hand into her pocket, and presented the urchin, her earliest and staunchest customer, with silver enough to people the Domdaniel cavern of his interior with as various a procession of quadrupeds as passed into the ark".

In T.H White's book The Sword in the Stone Merlin, before his famous duel of magic with the witch Madam Mim, says: "Now we shall see how a double first at Dom-Daniel avails against the private tuition of my master Bleise".

H. P. Lovecraft used Domdaniel in the short story He (1925), as follows: ...heard as with the mind's ear the blasphemous domdaniel of cacophony...

British author Angie Sage used the name DomDaniel (styled this way) to name the main foe of her fantasy novel series Septimus Heap.

Domdaniel is the headquarters of the Spanish Inquisition in Neil Gaiman's graphic novel Marvel 1602 and includes large caverns. Domdaniel secretly served as the headquarters of Grand Inquisitor Enrique and The Brotherhood of those Who Will Inherit the Earth. Gaiman also made reference to Domdaniel in Sandman #19, referring to Auberon, the King of Faerie, as "Auberon of Dom-Daniel", and again in The Books of Magic #3 where Doctor Occult lists Dom-Daniel as one of the names of the land of Faerie.

G. K. Chesterton referred to "a cavern so far from the light of day that it might have been the legendary Domdaniel cavern that was under the floor of the sea" in the first chapter of The Everlasting Man, The Man in the Cave.

== See also ==
- Scholomance
