= Serpent's Wall =

Ancient earthworks in Ukraine

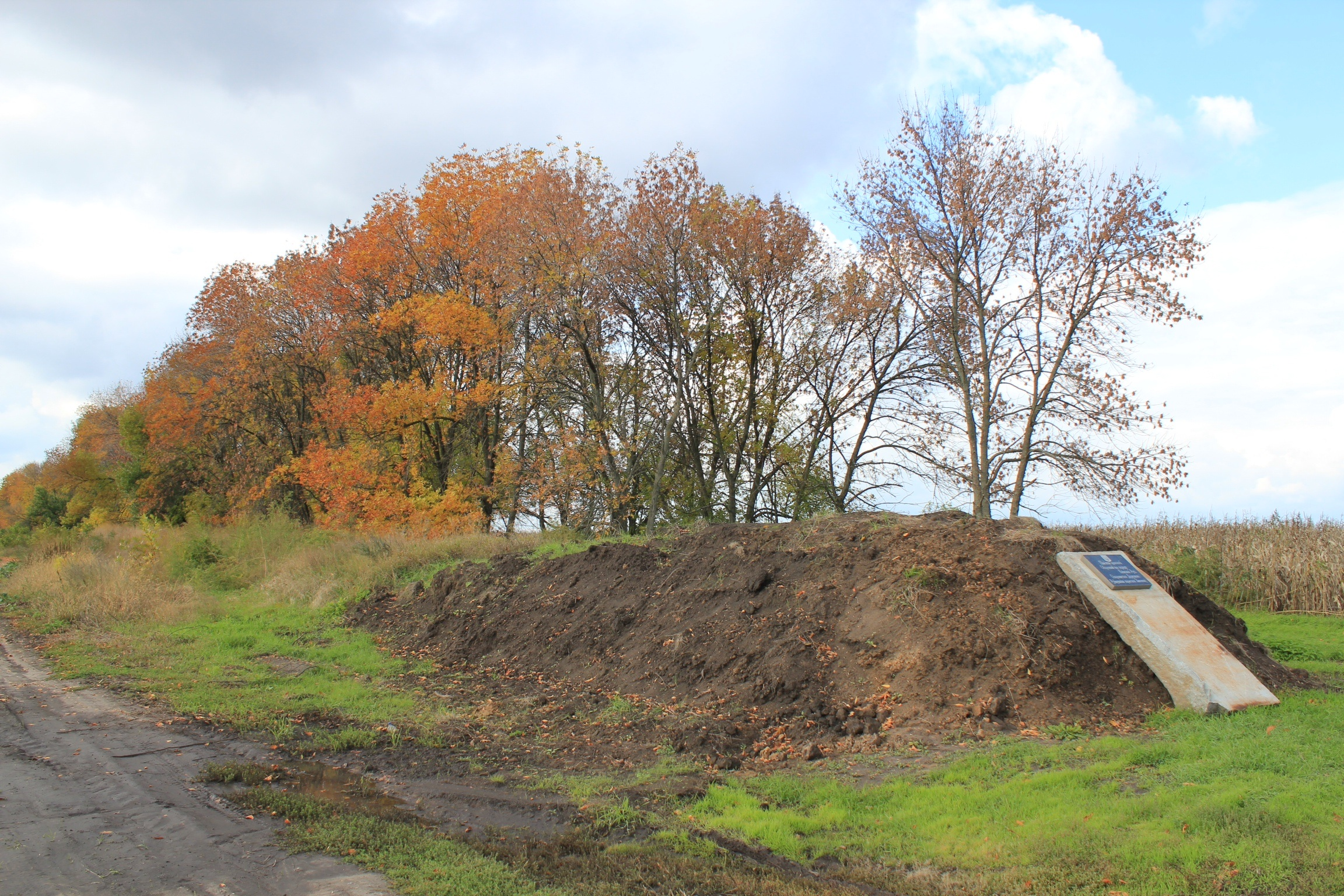
Serpent's Wall near the village of Denysy, Boryspil Raion

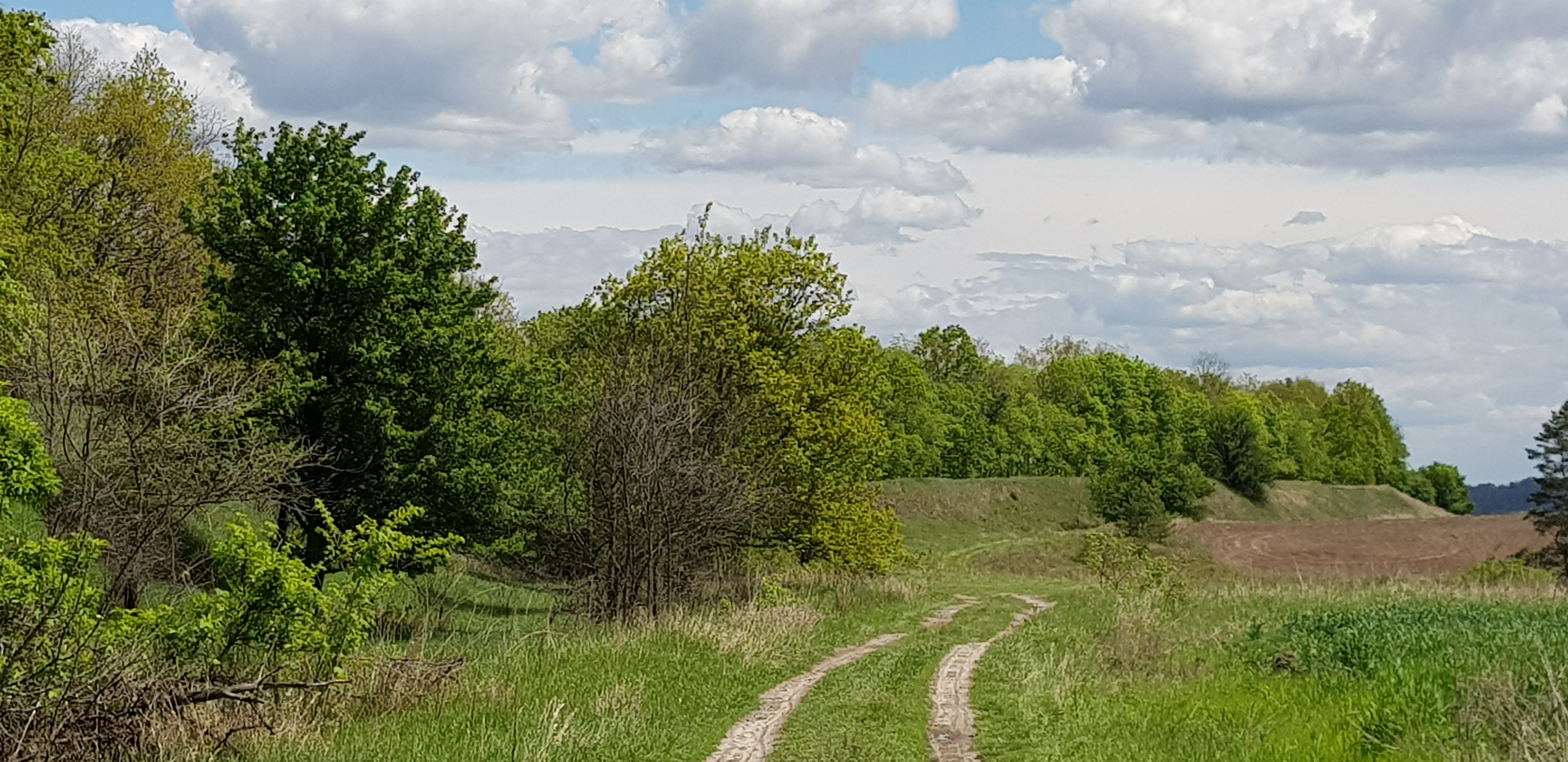
Wall near village of Ivankovychi

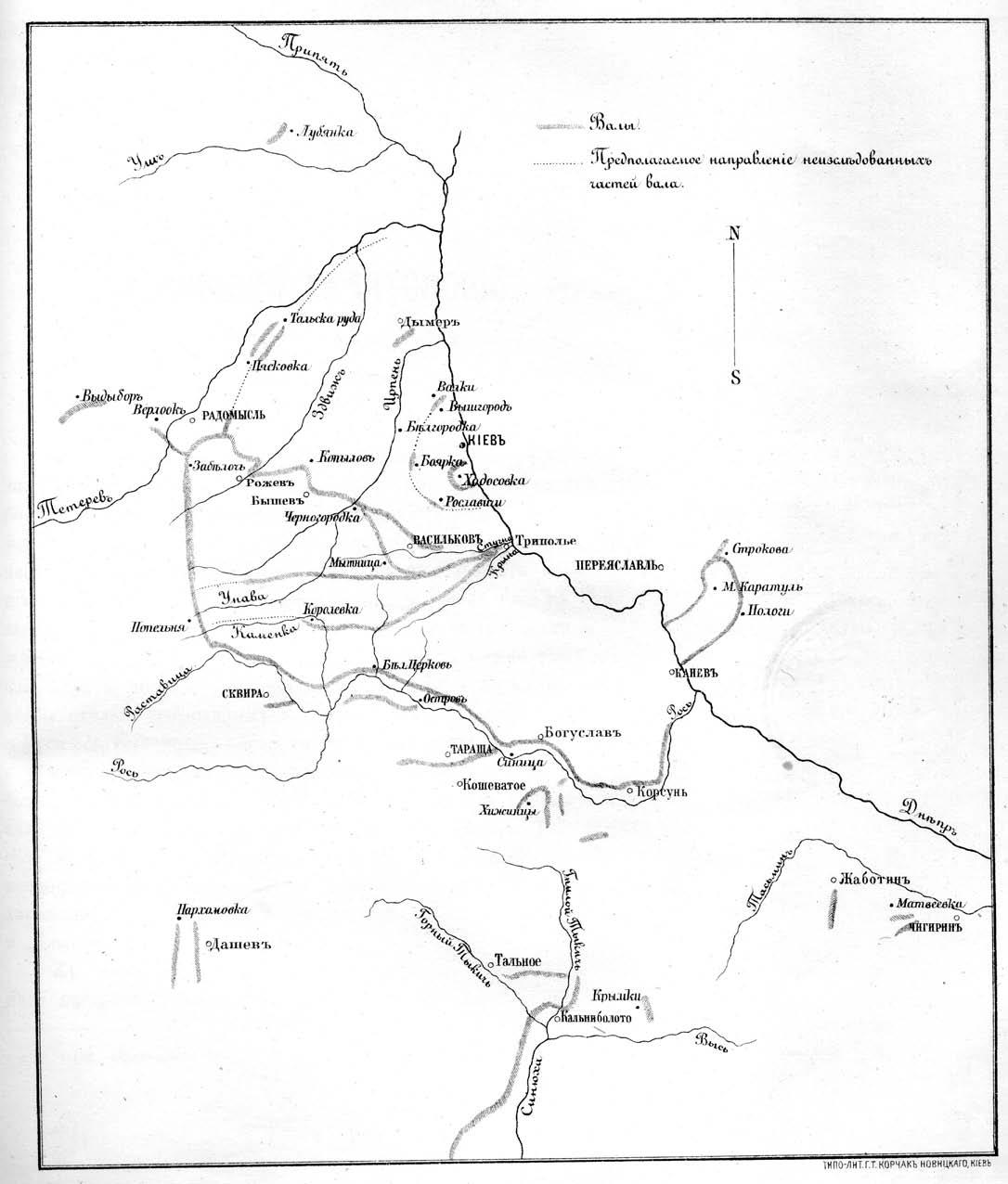
An incomplete map of the Serpent's Wall compiled by V. B. Antonovich (1884). It contains errors and inaccuracies.

The Serpent's Wall (Ukrainian: Змієві вали, romanized: Zmiievi valy, lit. 'Winged dragon's walls') is an ancient system of earthworks (valla) located in the middle Dnieper Ukraine (Naddniprianshchyna) that stretch across primarily Kyiv Oblast, Ukraine. They seem to be similar in purpose and character to Trajan's Wall situated to the southwest in Bessarabia. The remaining ancient walls have a total length of 1,000 km and constitute less than 20% of the original wall system.

== History ==
According to legend, the earthworks are the result of ancient events when a mythical hero (bohatyr), Kozmodemian (or Borysohlib), in order to slay the gargantuan dragon (serpent) Gornych, harnessed it to a giant plow and furrowed the earth. Gornych bit the dust and left furrows, on both sides of which were immense banks of earth that became known as Serpent's Wall.

The ancient walls were built between the 2nd century BC and 7th century AD, according to carbon dating. There are three theories as to what peoples built the walls: either the Sarmatians against the Scythians, or the Goths of Oium against the Huns, or the Early East Slavs against the nomads of the southern steppes. In Slavic culture, the warlike nomads are often associated with the winged dragon, hence the name.

On the right bank of Dnieper between its tributaries Teteriv and Ros the remnants of the walls form six lines stretching from west to east. One Serpent's Wall passed over the left bank of Dnieper and its tributary Sula.

The 1974-85 explorations established that Serpent's Wall is a remnant of wooded earth fortifications built at the end of 10th and the first half of 11th centuries, smaller part in the 12th century, to protect middle Dnieper Ukraine and Kyiv from Pechenegs and Cumans. Later excavation, southeast of the historical town Pereiaslav, brought to light ceramic materials dated to the third or fourth century and attributed to the Chernyakhov culture. Remains of a timber construction were also found in a trial excavation of 2019 near the village of Khotsky. While none of these findings are conclusive, they concur in suggesting a later date of construction than earlier theories.

Due to military unrest in the region, specifically Russia's 2022 attempt to surround Kyiv, the damage to nearby sections of the Serpent's Wall is of yet impossible to assess.

== Gallery ==
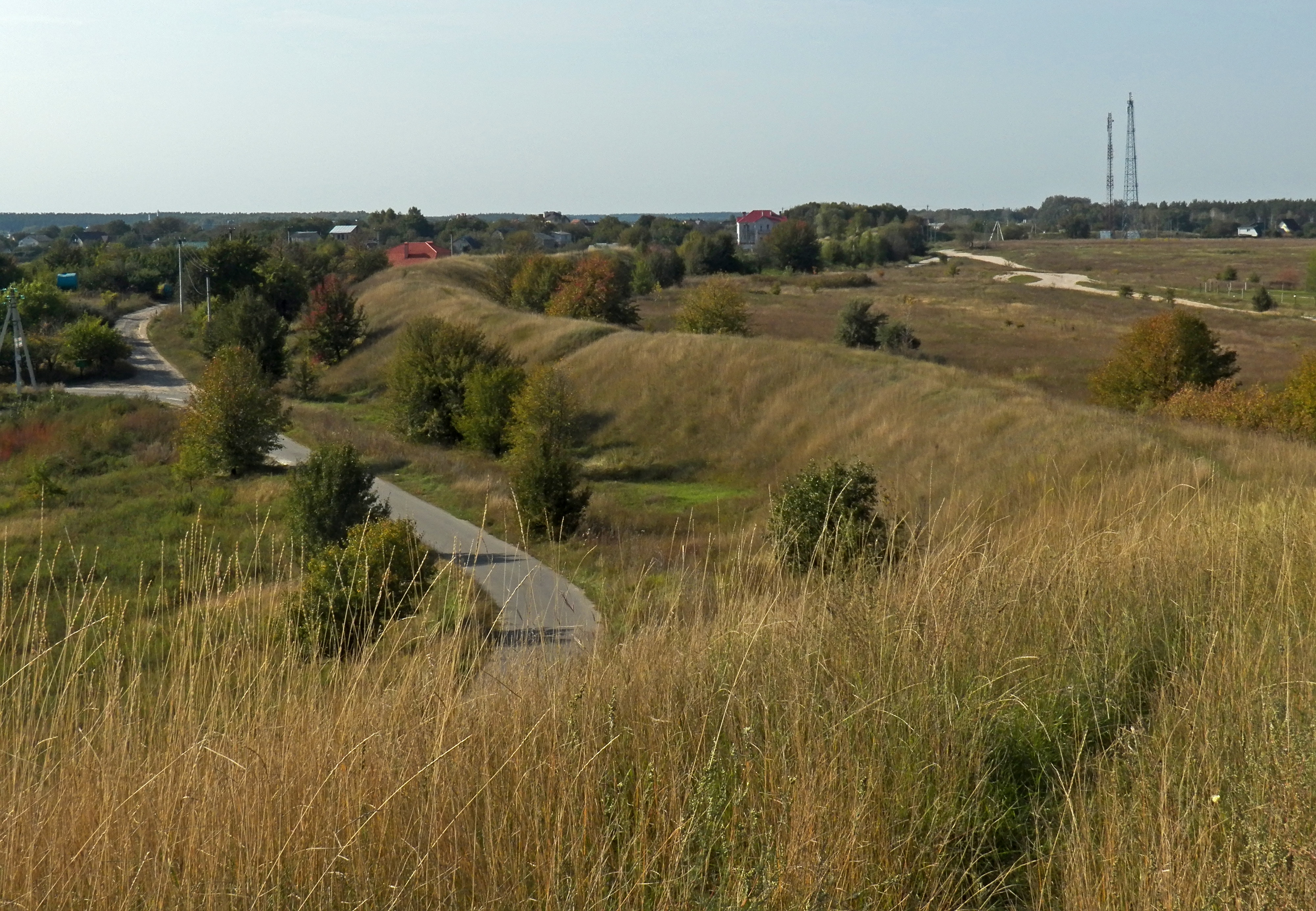
Vallums near village of Ivankovychi, Obukhiv Raion

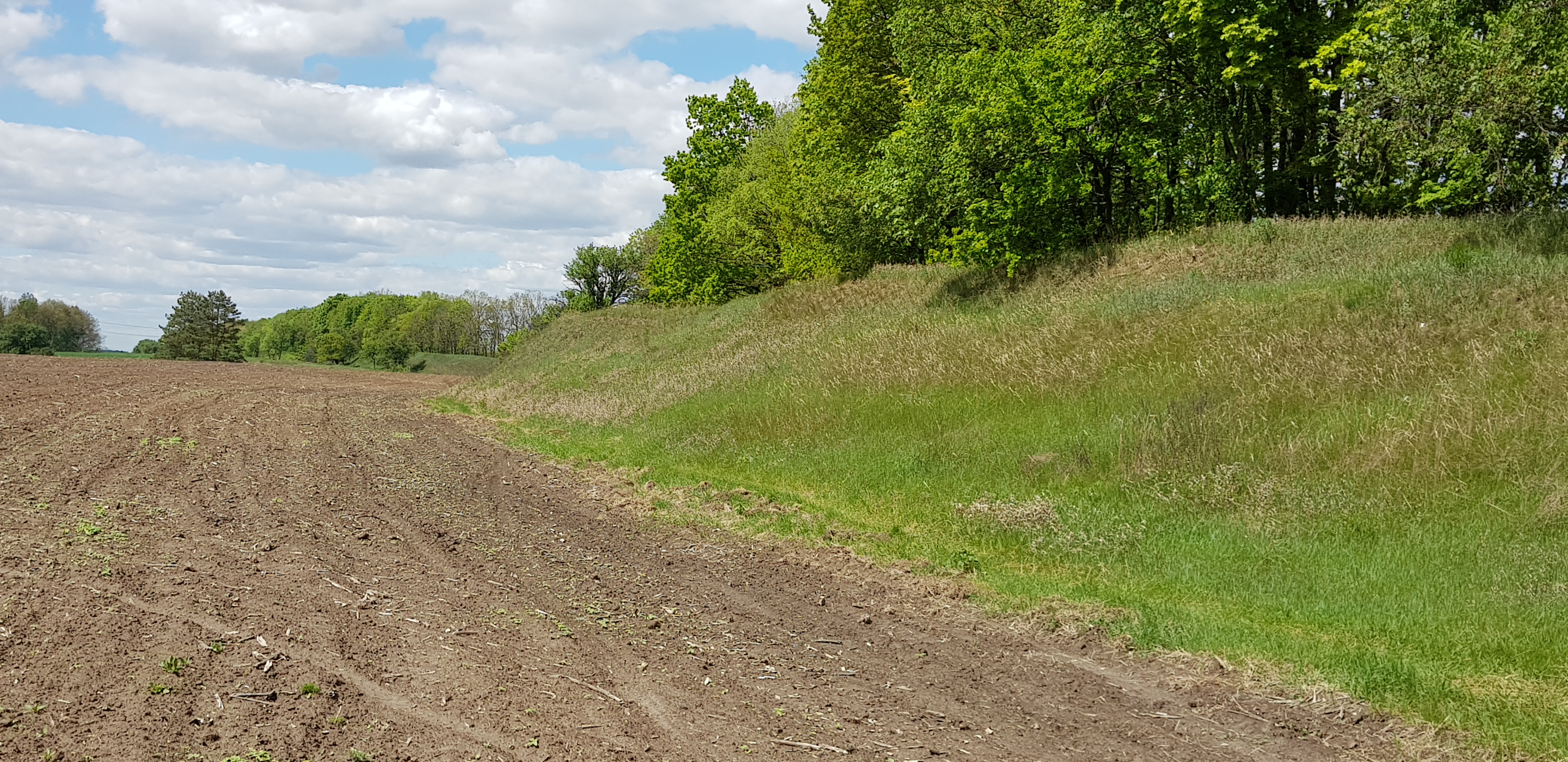
Wall near village of Ivankovychi
