= Thalaba the Destroyer =

Poem by Robert Southey

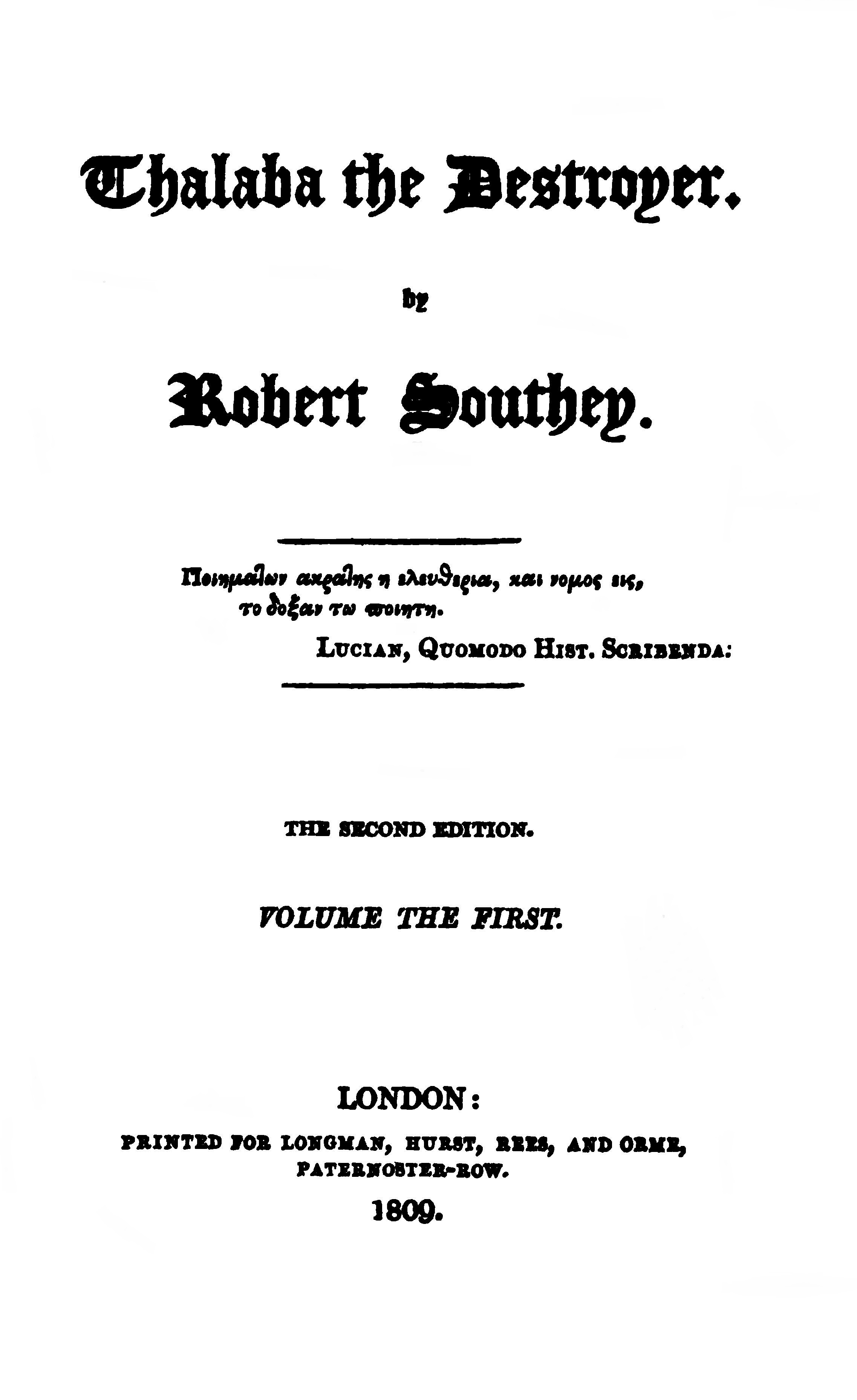
Title page to the 1809 second edition

Thalaba the Destroyer is an 1801 epic poem composed by Robert Southey. The origins of the poem can be traced to Southey's school boy days, but he did not begin to write the poem until he finished composing Madoc at the age of 25. Thalaba the Destroyer was completed while Southey travelled in Portugal. When the poem was finally published by the publisher Longman, it suffered from poor sales and only half of the copies were sold by 1804.

The poem is divided into twelve "books" with irregular stanza structures and unrhymed lines of poetry. The story describes how a group of sorcerers work to destroy the Hodeirah family in an attempt to prevent a prophecy of their future doom from coming true. However, a young child named Thalaba is able to escape from the slaughter. After one of the sorcerers hunts down Thalaba to kill him, the sorcerer is defeated by a great storm and his powerful magical ring comes into Thalaba's possession. With the ring, Thalaba travels across the Middle East to find a way to defeat the evil sorcerers. In the end, Thalaba is able to stay true to Allah and is guided by the prophet Mohammad in destroying the sorcerers.

Southey uses the poem to describe various superstitions and myths, with a heavy reliance on repetition of various themes that link the myths together. Critics gave the work mixed reviews, with some emphasising the strong morality within the work or the quality of the poetry. However, other critics felt that the lack of a strong lyrical structure and the use of Middle Eastern myths detracted from the poem.

== Background ==
The basis for Southey wishing to write long poems came from his private reading of literature while attending Westminster School as a boy. In Summer 1799, Southey completed writing Madoc and began working on Thalaba. He started to work with Coleridge, and both Coleridge's "Kubla Khan" and Thalaba shared many sources. He then travelled to Burton where he continued to write the poem, which he called a romance at the time. Thalaba's idea came from the tale "Maugraby" by Jacques Cazotte in the Continuation of the Arabian Nights (1798-1789)

He soon after travelled to Portugal in April 1800 where he planned to finish Thalaba and send it back to England for publication. By July, he was able to complete the poem and in October the poem was edited and ready for publication. John Rickman served as Southey's agent in selling the book. Although finished, Southey continued to work on fixing the end of the poem until January 1801 after receiving suggestions from his friends. After Portugal went to war with France and Spain, Southey left the country and he returned to England in June 1801. The poem was published in 1801 by Longman with 1,000 copies, but only sold half by 1804. A revised edition was published in 1809.

== Poem ==
The poem is a twelve-book work with irregular stanzas and lines that are not rhymed. The poem deals with Harun al-Rashid and a group of sorcerers at Domdaniel that live under the sea. It was foretold that Thalaba, a Muslim, would be God's champion and conquer the sorcerers. To pre-empt the prophecy, the sorcerers kill the Hodeirah family. Unknown to them, Thalaba was able to escape from harm with his mother Zeinab. They flee through the desert and arrive at Irem, a ruined city. After Zeinab dies, Thalaba is raised by a leader of Irem named Moath. The sorcerers find out that Thalaba is still alive, and Abdaldar, one of their members, goes to find out Thalaba's location. When Abdaldar arrives, he is stopped by a simoom, a sand storm, and his magic ring is lost. Thalaba finds the ring, which grants him great power.

A demon comes to steal the ring from Thalaba, but he is stopped by the young boy. This allows Thalaba to demand information about the sorcerers and why his family was killed. Time passes and Thalaba settles into a pastoral life at Irem and plans to marry Moath's daughter, Oneiza. However, Thalaba decides that his duty prohibits him from such actions, and he leaves to fulfill his destiny. However, the sorcerer Lobaba tricks Thalaba and tries to steal the ring. After many failed attempts, Lobaba tries to convince Thalaba to harness the ring's magic power, which would bring Thalaba harm. Instead, Thalaba argues against the use of magic in general and realises that Lobaba is evil. Although Thalaba attempts to kill Lobaba and fails by the sorcerer's magic, a storm comes and destroys the sorcerer.

Thalaba travels past Baghdad onto the ruins of Babylon to find Haruth and Maruth, two angels that know about magic. While searching for them, he runs across Mohareb, an evil warrior. Mohareb offers to take Thalaba through the city and they travel through the cave of Zohak. Zohak, an individual punished to have snakes constantly eat at his brain, tries to stop them before Mohareb distracts him. The two continue to travel into the dwelling of Haruth and Maruth and, when Mohareb finds out that Thalaba is not evil, attacks him. However, the ring protects Thalaba. After Mohareb claims that magic was the only reason why Thalaba lives, Thalaba decides to get rid of the ring into a pit before the two resume fighting. Soon after, Mohareb is also thrown into the pit and Thalaba is able to ask the angels what he needs to defeat his enemies. He is simply told "faith".

Thalaba travels to the land of Aloadin, who owns a great garden paradise, and he is invited to feast with the people, but he is unwilling to imbibe alcohol or be taken in by the dancing women that seek to entice him. The temptations overwhelm him to the point where he can no longer tolerate them and he flees. Shortly after leaving, he discovers one of the women being attacked by a man wanting to have his way with her. It is revealed that the woman was Oneiza, who was captured, and that Aloadin was a sorcerer. After saving Oneiza, Thalaba is determined to stop the sorcerer and he ends up killing him. Following this, they are praised by a Sultan that Aloadin wanted to kill, and Thalaba decides to marry Oneiza. Before they can finish their marriage, she dies and Thalaba is left to mourn over her grave. While mourning, a spirit that appears to be Oneiza begins to haunt Thalaba and claim that God disapproves of the young warrior. However, Moath comes and is able to recognise the spirit as a vampire. After killing the vampire, the real Oneiza comes to guide Thalaba onwards.

Thalaba travels to look for Simorg, the Bird of Ages, on the mountain Kaf. While wandering, he meets an old woman, Maimuna, who is a sorceress. She casts a spell upon him and he is sent to the land of Mohareb, by now an evil Sultan. However, Maimuna's sister, Khawla, knows that if Thalaba is killed that Mohareb would also be killed and she seeks to kill Thalaba to remove Mohareb. Finding this out, Mohareb joins with Thalaba and returns the ring. After telling Thalaba to turn to the darker powers, Thalaba leaves. Khawla attempts to use her magic to kill Thalaba, but the ring protects him. When Maimuna tries to use her own magic against Thalaba, she witnesses the goodness of the universe and repents her evil ways. She repays him by using her magic to bring him back to the mountain, and Thalaba is able to return to his search for Simorg. After wandering through snow, Thalaba comes across the Font of Fire with the sleeping Laila trapped inside. It turns out she was placed there by her father, the sorcerer Okba and one of the murderers of Thalaba's family.

Okba, old and worn out, comes and asks Thalaba to simply kill him and end his misery. However, Thalaba denies the request. The angel of death, Azrael, tells Thalaba that either Okba or Laila must die. Okba uses this chance to try and stab Thalaba, but Laila steps in between them and is killed. Okba curses God for his fate but Thalaba can only feel pity over the scene. After leaving, he is able to come to Simorg's valley. Simorg directs Thalaba to take a sled to continue on his way while the spirit of Laila asks Thalaba to end Okba's misery. However, Thalaba refuses to commit vengeance and he travels onwards until he arrives at a small boat waiting for him. He is taken down a river to the sea where Thalaba tosses away his magic ring. He is then taken to a cave that would lead him to the domain of the sorcerers.

Thalaba travels down into the cave and meets the warrior Othatha chained to rocks. Thalaba frees Othatha before travelling further until he meets an Efreet that guards a gate to the Domdaniel. After shooting an arrow into an eye of the Efreet, he is able to proceed forward where he meets Khawla and Mohareb. He is able to knock them away from him and quickly moves forward to find the powerful sword of his father. The sword of flames covers Thalaba in flames which causes the area to be filled with light. This scares the sorcerers who then try to attack him. After Thalaba defeats Mohareb and the sorcerers, the voice of Mohammad asks Thalaba what he wishes. Thalaba simply gives his will up to the Prophet before destroying an evil idol, which destroys the cave.

== Themes ==
The story depicts how suffering is essential to completing one's destiny. Southey's purpose in Thalaba, however, is to describe as many of the various myths and superstitions that he can, and this interferes with the resolving of moral problems within the story. Instead, the moral lessons are formulaic and the events focus on awards given to those who are obedient. Southey's emphasis on the actual mythic incidents over the moral events are backed up with more than 80 pages of his own notes that describe the various references to traditional myths or mythic creatures that are incorporated into the story. In terms of structure, the unilateral plot keeps Thalaba does not allow for an easy flow into various mythic incidents. Instances of the plot being supplanted by the myths can be found during the descriptions of the story of Irem, Haruth and Maruth, or others.

There is reliance on repetition of themes within the plot of Thalaba. Three times he attained a paradise that turns out to be false, and this is followed by the death of a woman who is gone until the very end when Thalaba is awarded entrance into a true paradise. The seeking out of mythic figures to guide him onto the next part of the tale is equally repetitive and has little result for the plot. Various instances of the sorcerers and sorceresses are added to the story to emphasise the evil of magic along with tempting Thalaba with power. However, the emphasis on magic hides the moral within Thalaba's temptations. Although Thalaba does achieve his goal through moral submission, many of the quests and actions are arbitrary and repetitive. As such, they take away from any Islamic truth that could be found within the actions.

Other images, such as Thalaba reclaiming his father's magic sword, are symbols that effectively reinforce Southey's moral themes. However, these events represent the minority of the plot and are rarely relied on early in the story. To the contrary, the heavily represented magic ring is used to protect Thalaba with little explanation as to how it works and there is no moral statements tied to its use. As a whole, the poem is able to portray scenery and events in strongly descriptive manners, but the manner in doing this takes away from their meaning and effect. In terms of the divine there is a dual entity: Allah representing preservation and Eblis representing destruction. However, evil, though an opposite to good, is never explained but merely used to further the plot.

== Critical response ==
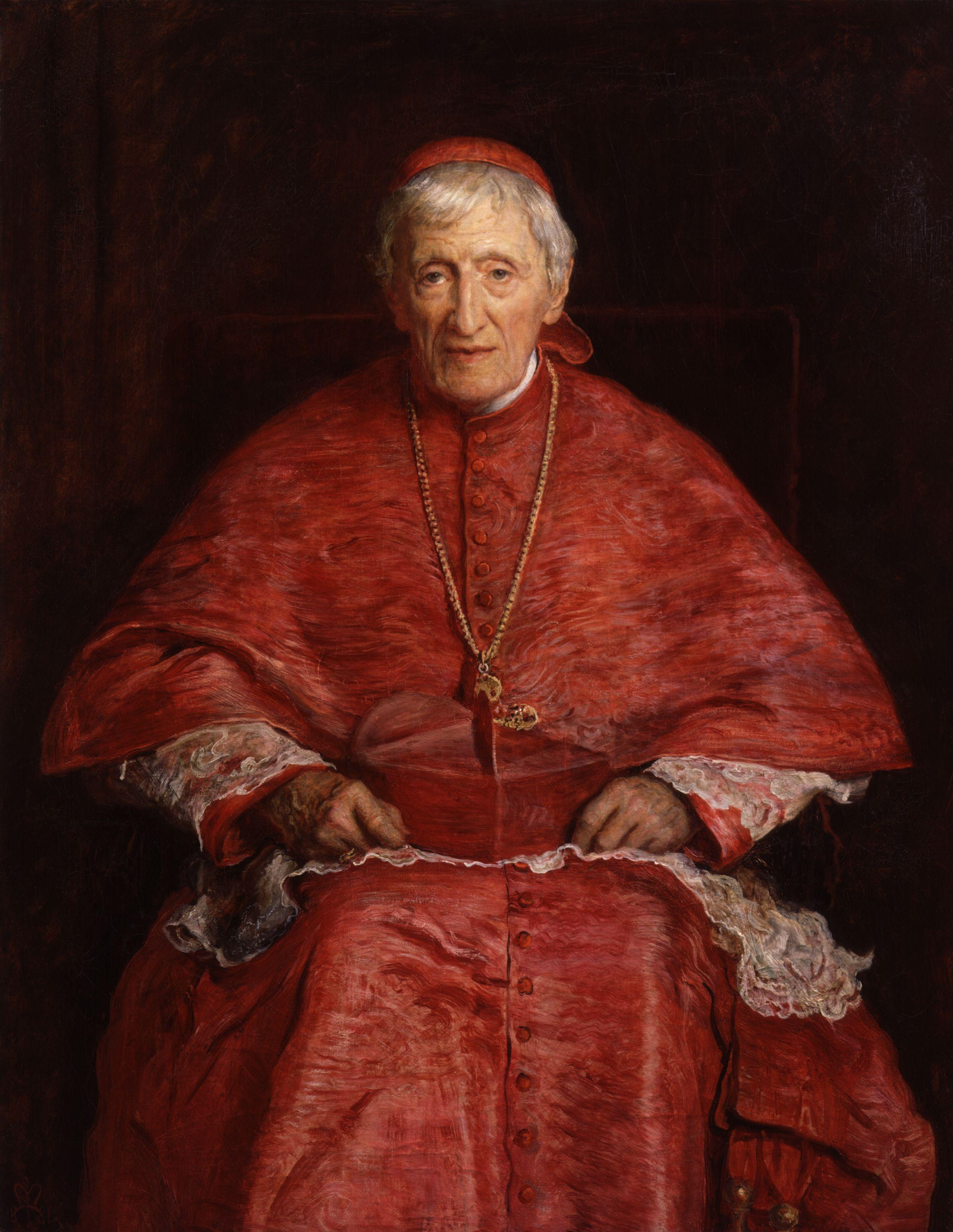
Cardinal Newman, supporter of Thalaba

Ernest Bernhard-Kabisch pointed out that "Few readers have been as enthusiastic about it as Cardinal Newman who considered it the most 'morally sublime' of English poems. But the young Shelley reckoned it his favorite poem, and both he and Keats followed its lead in some of their verse narratives." An anonymous review in the September 1801 British Critic claimed, "A more complete monument of vile and depraved taste no man ever raised [...] He has, therefore, given a rhapsody of Twelve Books in a sort of irregular lyric, so unlike verse or sense, that if it were worth while to present our readers with a tissue of so coarse a texture, we could fill whole pages with specimens of its absurdity. We will have mercy, and give only a single example, which may be taken at random, for no part seems to be better than the rest."

This was followed by an October 1801 anonymous review in the Monthly Mirror that argued, "It is a matter to be lamented, that, in times like the present, a work of letters can rarely be reviewed upon the ground of its own proper merits ... In the consideration of this romance, the judicious critic cannot but feel that one rule of good writing has been studiously observed. His work will not incur the censure passed by the late Mr. Collins upon his Persian Eclogues, namely, that, from erroneous manners, they were 'Irish.'" The review continued, "He tells us it is metrical ... He will excuse our ears, but we cannot agree with him. Among the sins of our youth, we, like him, have traded in desultory versification, but have long been brought back to lyrical rhyme, and heroic blank verse. The reasons are obvious ... We recommend his beauties to the esteem, and his faults to the forgetfulness, of every reader. Upon the whole, he has our thanks for much amusement, and some information."

An anonymous review in the January 1802 Monthly Magazine stated, "The fable or story of Thalaba is perhaps too marvellous: every incident is a miracle; every utensil, an amulet; every speech, a spell; every personage, a god; or rather a talismanic statue; of which destiny and magic overrule the movements, not human hopes and fears—not human desires and passions, which always must excite the vivid sympathy of men. It offers, however, scope beyond other metrical romances, for a splendid variety of description". The review continued, "Whatever loss of interest this poem may sustain, as a whole, by an apparent driftlessness of the events and characters, is compensated by the busy variety, the picturesque imagery, and striking originality of the parts."

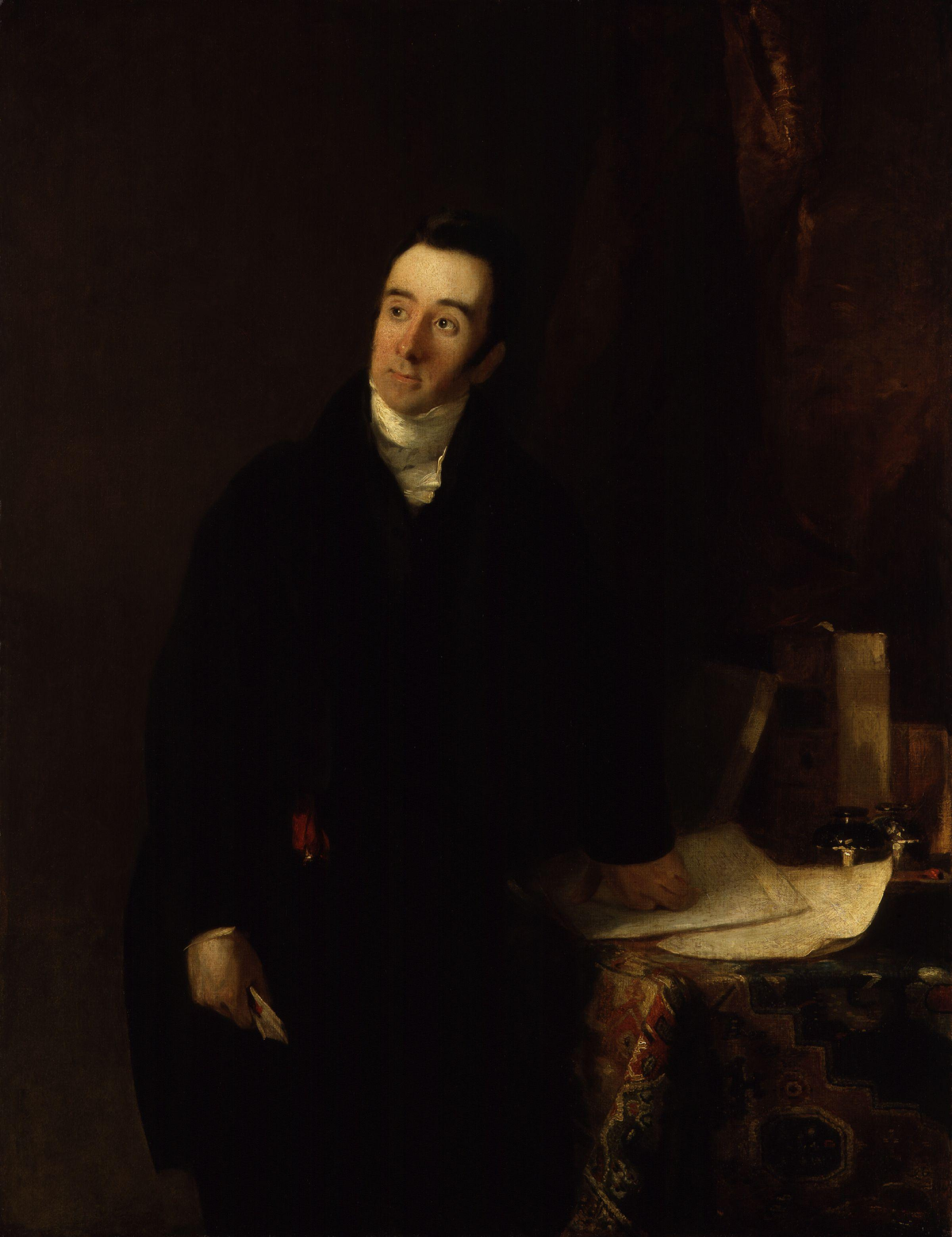
Francis Jeffrey, critic of Thalaba and of the British Romantic poets as a whole

Later in 1802, Francis Jeffrey, editor of the Edinburgh Review, submitted a review on Thalaba. In the October 1802 edition, he claimed that Southey "belongs to a sect of poets, that has established itself in this country within these ten or twelve years, and is looked upon, we believe, as one of its chief champions and apostles ... As Mr Southey is the first author, of this persuasion, that has yet been brought before us for judgment, we cannot discharge our inquisitorial office conscientiously, without premising a few words upon the nature and tendency of the tenets he has helped to promulgate. The disciples of this school boast much of its originality." This led to a discussion of Southey's flaws: "Originality, however, we are persuaded, is rarer than mere alteration ... That our new poets have abandoned the old models, may certainly be admitted; but we have not been able to discover that they have yet created any models of their own." He continued to discuss the flaws of the British Romantic poets before returning to Thalaba when he argued, "The subject of this poem is almost as ill chosen as the diction; and the conduct of the fable as disorderly as the versification ... From this little sketch of the story, our readers will easily perceive, that it consists altogether of the most wild and extravagant fictions, and openly sets nature and probability at defiance. In its action it is not an imitation of anything; and excludes all rational criticism, as to the choice and succession of its incidents."

This was followed by a December 1803 review in The Critical Review by William Taylor that said,

Perhaps no work of art so imperfect ever announced such power in the artist—perhaps no artist so powerful ever rested his fame on so imperfect a production—as Thalaba. The author calls it a metrical romance; he might have called it a lyrical one; for the story is told, as in an ode, by implication; not directly, as in an epopoeia. It is a gallery of successive pictures. Each is strikingly descriptive ... but the personages, like the figures of landscape-painters, are often almost lost in the scene: they appear as the episodical or accessory objects.

The review continued, "The style of Thalaba has a plasticity and variety, of which epic poetry offers no other example. The favourite formulas of every school of diction have been acquired, and are employed ... This stunning impression of the style gives pain, we believe, especially to mere English scholars, and to those whose comparison of art is narrow and confined, but falls within the limits of pleasure, and is even a cause of luxurious stimulation, to readers of a wider range and a more tolerant taste."

In 1977, Bernhardt-Kabisch claimed that the poem was "probably the most influential and historically the most important of Southey's long poems" and "What made Thalaba distinctive as well as provocative was above all its flamboyant exoticism." However, he pointed out that "The chief weakness is the diffuse and tortuous plot which eddies and meanders without any firm principle of progression as the hero posts from stage to mysterious stage."

Sir Granville Bantock authored "Thalaba the Destroyer – Symphonic Poem" (1899) based on the poem.
