= Storm-Bogatyr, Ivan the Cow's Son =

Russian fairy tale

"Storm-Bogatyr, Ivan the Cow's Son" (Russian: Буря-богатырь Иван коровий сын) is a Russian fairy tale (skazka) #136 collected by Alexander Afanasyev in Narodnye russkie skazki, categorized as Aarne-Thompson type 300 A and 519.

"Blast Bogatyr Ivan the Cow's Son" or "Ivan the Cow's Son" are alternative English titles given by other translators.

== General information ==
"Burya-Bogatyr Ivan-Korovich syn" (Буря-богатырь Иван коровий сын) is tale #136 in Alexander Afanasyev's mid-19th-century collection Narodnye russkie skazki ("Russian Folk Tales"). It occurs as tale number 136 "Storm-Bogatyr, Ivan the Cow's Son", in the complete translation by Jack V. Haney (2014). Other translations include "Blast Bogatyr Ivan the Cow's Son" in the dual-language edition by Sergei Levchin (2014), and "Ivan the Cow's Son", translated by Norbert Guterman (1946).

The tale is categorized as AT tale type 300 A and 519. It was recorded in the Orenburg guberniya in the Imperial Russian era.

== Synopsis ==
The birth of three Ivans

The story begins by explaining how three Ivans were born on the same day: the main hero who was the son of a cow, the prince, and a maidservant's son.

The king of a foreign realm made a worldwide plea for anyone who could make his childless queen pregnant. A certain peasant's son, instructed by a wise old hag, presented the king with a gold-winged pike (щука златокрылая) netted near the palace. That day, the cow that drank the slop water from the fish the cooks were cleaning, the servant-girl who tasted the fish while carrying the dish, and the queen who was served the dish all conceived a child. The three females came to term simultaneously, and on the same day delivered Ivan the Cow's Son, Ivan Tsarevich the prince, and Ivan the maid's son. The three grew up with exceeding speed beyond the norm.

Three Ivans on a journey

When they come of age, the three Ivans ask the king to let them go on a journey to see the world. They have a contest throwing a glass marble high up in the air, in order to choose among them the one who should be considered the "senior". Ivan the Cow's Son, called Storm-Bogatyr is victorious. The prince suggests a rematch by competing over who can make the reptile (serpent) of the Black Sea stop its clucking, (Note: гад "reptile"; клохтать "to make intermittent sounds, as chickens do" (cluck).) but no amount of shouting by the other two Ivans perturbs the creature, and it was only the Storm-Bogatyr who made it flee with his shouting and stick-throwing. The other two Ivans are dissatisfied by the outcome, and they part ways, continuing their journey on their own.

Storm-Bogatyr reports to the tsar and is punished

The Storm-Bogatyr returns to the tsardom alone and is thrown into the fortress, left starving without food for three days. He demands an explanation of his mistreatment, as he has done nothing wrong, threatening to knock down the walls. The tsar comes to see him personally, and Ivan assures him the other two son's are alive and well, but have continued their journey by themselves in a place where three serpents with six, nine, and twelve heads appears out of the Black Sea. The Storm-Bogatyr declares only he is capable of tracking them down, and at the tsar's request, goes in pursuit, armed with his battle club and magic sword (Sword Kladenets, although this sword does not play much of the role in the tale).

Storm-Bogatyr defeats the three water-dragons

The Storm-Bogatyr catches up with his brothers at Kalin Bridge ("blazing bridge", "white hazelwood bridge"). A pillar is marked with a warning-sign that three zmei ("serpents", or "dragons") are known to appear at this spot. On the night the six-headed zmei is supposed to appear, they cast lots to choose who will stand watch. Although Ivan the Maid's Son is picked, he sleeps through the night, and it is the Storm-Bogatyr who faces off against the six-headed Chudo-Yudo (Note: While some translators adopt the convention of rendering this as proper noun "Chudo-Yudo", one translator construes the word as equivalent to chudovishe (чудовище) "monster", appended with a meaningless rhyming suffix -iudo.) (or "sea-monster") that appears out of the water. The monster summons its horse Sivko-Burko (Сивко-бурко) or "Dun-gray", which stumbles, recognizing the scent of their nemesis, the Storm-Bogatyr. The fight begins, and the hero destroys his foe by knocking off three heads of the enemy at each turn. He hides all the heads under the bridge, while cutting up the corpse and sinking it in the Black Sea. He returns to their hut and ties the captured horse to Ivan Maid's Son, who wakes up in the morning and imagines the horse to be God's gift to him.

The second night, the action is repeated with the appearance of the nine-headed monster. The Storm-Bogatyr gives the captured horse, also called Sivko-Burko but better than the previous, to Ivan the Prince. The third night, the Storm-Bogatyr prepares for a difficult fight, asking his brothers to stay alert, and to come to his aid when there appears the sign that he is imperiled (the candle will falter, and the hanging towel will drip blood into a dish). It is a pitched battle with the twelve-headed. After smiting off six of its heads, (Note: At one point, the Storm-Bogatyr is knocked to the ground, but protests that he cannot be struck while on the ground according to the rules of combat they agreed upon in advance, and the monster refrains. Right afterwards, the Storm-Bogatyr made three heads fly like heads of cabbage.) the two grapple with each other into exhaustion, until at last the hero strikes off three more heads, but his club is broken in the effort. He then throws his boots to alert his brothers but they do not awaken. He then hurls the broken club, causing the two captured horses to arrive and knock the twelve-headed Chudo-Yudo off its horse, whereupon the Storm-Bogatyr severs the remaining heads. (Note: The Storm-Bogatyr evidently has fought on foot throughout, as he is described as running during the battle.)

The wives of the dragons scheme revenge

The brothers could not find trace of the Storm-Bogatyr for three days, and decide to turn back. The Storm-Bogatyr then appears, reproaching them for trying to abandon him so ungratefully, but forgives them. Before leaving, the Storm-Bogatyr decides to double back to the hut where they were lodging ("hut on chicken legs"), and transforms into a fly to eavesdrop on its true residents, the Baba-Yaga, who is the mother of the monsters, and her three daughters-in-law who were married to them. The daughters utter each of their schemes: transforming into a meadow with a well and a bed, an orchard full of fruits, and an old hut, so that when the brothers are enticed to seek respite, they will be blown to bits like poppy seeds. (Note: The Storm-Bogatyr has gone back to the hut on the pretense that he had forgotten his horse-whip at the hut. Before he rejoins his brothers, he fashions a makeshift whip by tying a little piece of bast (мочалочка, diminutive of мочало, rope made from the bark of the linden tree, etc.) to a twig to show them the whip he pretends to have forgotten.)

When the meadow and well, the orchard, and the old hut are encountered, suspiciously out of place in the middle of the steppes and desert, the brothers are lured into resting there or eating the fruits. But Storm-Bogatyr, armed with foreknowledge, warns his brothers off, and smites and cuts the well in the meadow, the trees in the orchards, and the hut (the well and the hut bleed, betraying themselves to be transformations). The brothers gripe about being denied their refreshments, and they part ways again at a fork in the road.

Baba-Yaga turns into devouring sow

Baba-Yaga turns into a sow and devours the two brothers who went astray. But Storm-Bogatyr who overheard her plans prepares for her attack at a village he entered, hiring twelve blacksmiths to fortify their smithy with an iron plate. When she arrives demanding the blacksmiths to surrender Storm-Bogatyr, they invite her to extend her tongue to snatch him away. When she gullibly does so, Ivan clasps her tongue with a pair of tongs heated red-hot, and the smiths and the hero beat the sow with iron rods until all her ribs are broken. She begs mercy and disgorges the two Ivans, but the hero smashes her into bits.

Hero wins Indian princess for Ivan the Prince

The three heroes arrive in a kingdom in India, and the Storm-Bogatyr delivers an ultimatum to its king, demanding that he marry his princess to Ivan the Prince, or send out an army to resist. The Storm-Bogatyr annihilates the army with his ladle, and the king is compelled to offer the princess in marriage. During the banquet, the princess transforms into a dove (Note: голубка.) and visits her grandfather with the golden hair and silver beard who emerges from the sea. She asks him to pluck three hairs for her, which she will show to Ivan the Prince to make him guess where the "grass" came from, as a condition for her to marry him. But since Storm-Bogatyr shadowed her in the guise of a falcon, Ivan is able to answer correctly. (Note: Actually Ivan did not make a verbal reply but showed the princess the head of her grandfather, which Storm-Bogatyr had wrenched off and carried back. But he restores the head back to its body by magic, and the princess is able to confirm her grandfather is back alive.) The Indian princess on her nuptial night attempts to smother Ivan with the pillow, but the Storm-Bogatyr had substituted himself, and he beats her with an iron, copper, and pewter rod until they break, and the princess submits, promising never to make such attempts again. The Storm-Bogatyr now wishes happiness upon Ivan the Prince and his wife, and bids never to forget him.

== Magical elements ==
Near the location where the three monsters appear, the three brothers discover a "hut on chicken legs" with a rooster's head, with the entrance faced the other way towards the forest, but which swings around and lets them in after the Storm-Bogatyr recites a short incantation. Inside the hut, the table was set with food and drink, and a bed there ready to be slept in. The "hut on chicken legs" is familiar as the abode of the Baba Yaga in Russian fairy tales. After the battle with the twelve-headed monster, the hut is broken into bits, but it repairs itself back into its original condition at Storm-Bogatyr's command.

The Storm-Bogatyr also performs a mysterious ritual, whereby he paces up and down the bridge while tapping it with his cane, until a little pitcher (or water-lily) appears and starts to dance; he then spits on this and smashes it, causing the Chudo-Yudo to immediately appear.

Several characters manifest the ability to transform, including the hero (who turns into a fly and a falcon). One researcher identifies Baba-Yaga's transformation into a sow (wild boar) as "one of the most ancient avatars of the Goddess of the Underworld", (Note: The examples given are not of the Goddess, but her consorts associated with the boar (Attis, Adonis, Osiris, Odysseus, and Sir Gawain).) and the transformations of her daughters-in-law as representing the themes of life and death.

"The Kalinov Bridge"

According to Russian scholarship, similar stories are attested in the East Slavic tale corpus, under the classification 300A*, "Возвращение змееборцем похищенных змеем небесных светил" ("Returning the celestial lights stolen by a serpent"). Russian scholar Lev Barag, who updated this classification index in 1979, noted that the story of the recovery of the celestial lights led into East Slavic type 300A, "Fight on Kalinov Bridge", whose last episode is the killing of the witch with the aid of the smith. According to Russian scholarship and folklorists, this Kalinov Bridge appears in East Slavic folklore as a liminal space, since the bridge crosses over a swamp or a fiery river named Smorodina, and upon it the hero does battle with the wicked villain (e. g., Chudo-Yudo, Zmei Gorynych).

The name "Kalinov" has been variously interpreted to mean "blazing", "incandescent", in regards to it being made of iron; or "a type of tree or flower", such as the guelder-rose tree (Viburnum).

According to professor Jack V. Haney, stories about a fight between the hero and a villain on a bridge are "common" in East Slavic.

== See also ==
- Ivan Popyalov
- Dobrynya Nikitich
- Greuceanu
