= Mysians =

Anatolian ethnic group (c. 1300–100 BCE)

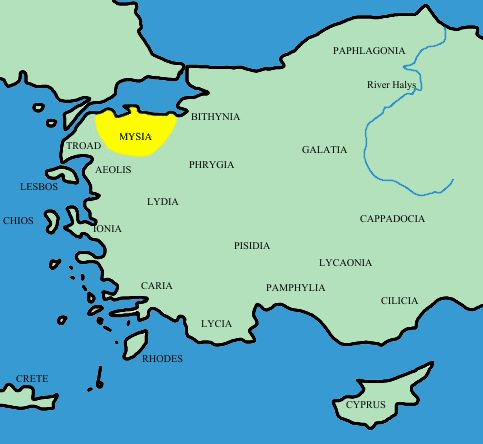
Land of the Mysians, who were at the origin of the historic name of the region (Mysia) in northwest Anatolia

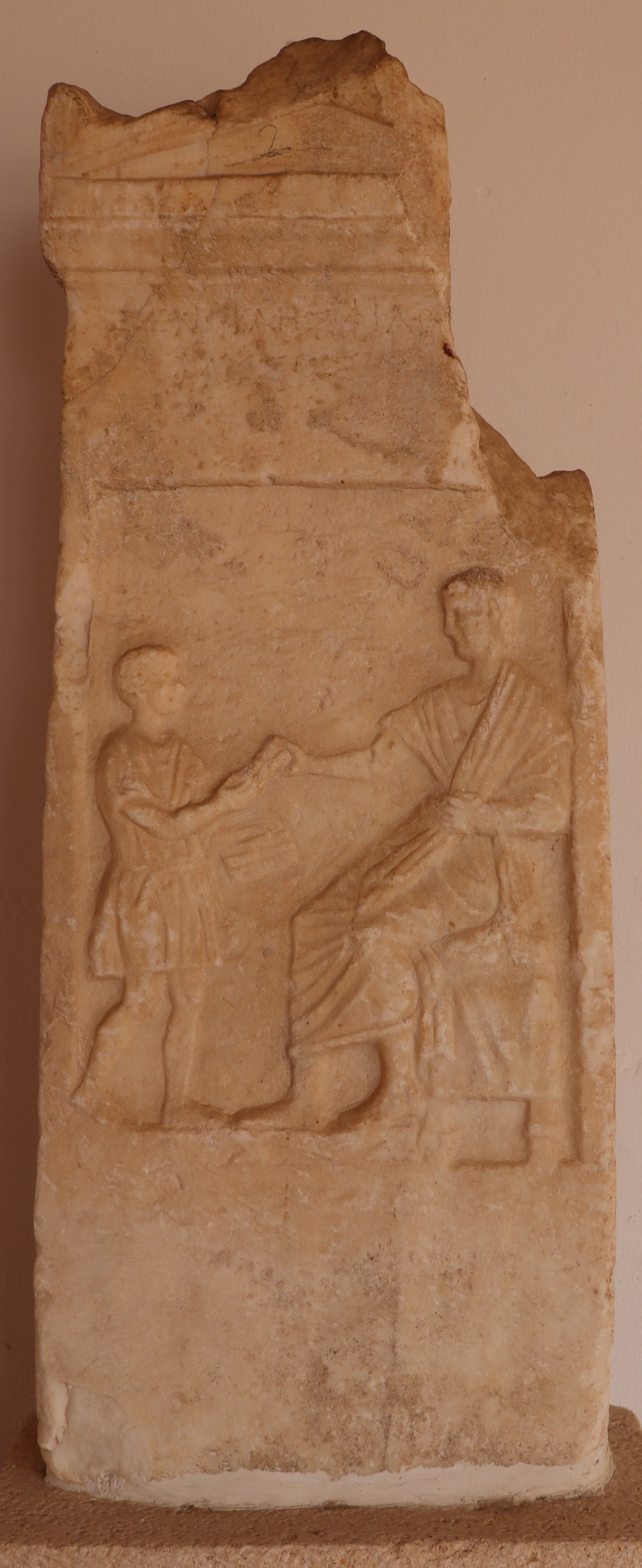
Funerary stela for Xenokles the Mysian

Mysians /ˈmiːʒənz, ˈmɪʒənz/ (Latin: Mysi; Ancient Greek: Μυσοί, Mysoí) were the inhabitants of Mysia, a region in northwestern Asia Minor.

== Origins according to ancient authors ==
Their first mention is by Homer, in his list of Trojans allies in the Iliad, and according to whom the Mysians fought in the Trojan War on the side of Troy, under the command of Chromis and Ennomus the Augur, and were lion-hearted spearmen who fought with their bare hands.

Herodotus in his Histories wrote that the Mysians were brethren of the Carians and the Lydians, originally Lydian colonists in their country, and as such, they had the right to worship alongside their relative nations in the sanctuary dedicated to the Carian Zeus in Mylasa. He also mentions a movement of Mysians and associated peoples from Asia into Europe still earlier than the Trojan War, wherein the Mysians and Teucrians had crossed the Bosphorus into Europe and, after conquering all of Thrace, pressed forward till they came to the Ionian Sea, while southward they reached as far as the river Peneus. Herodotus adds an account and description of later Mysians who fought in Darius' army.

Strabo in his Geographica informs that, according to his sources, the Mysians in accordance with their religion abstained from eating any living thing, including from their flocks, and that they used as food honey and milk and cheese. Citing the historian Xanthus, he also reports that the name of the people was derived from the Lydian name for the oxya tree.

== Mysian language ==
Little is known about the Mysian language. Strabo noted that their language was, in a way, a mixture of the Lydian and Phrygian languages. As such, the Mysian language could be a language of the Anatolian group. However, a passage in Athenaeus suggests that the Mysian language was akin to the barely attested Paeonian language of Paeonia, north of Macedon.

A short inscription which could be in Mysian and which dates from between the 5th and 3rd centuries BC was found in Üyücek, near Kütahya, and seems to include Indo-European words, but it has not been deciphered.

== See also ==
- Mysia
- Mysian language
- Ctistae
- Kapnobatai
