= Final boss =

Final boss may refer to:

- Final Boss (album), an album by MC Frontalot, 2008
- Final Boss (esports), an American Halo esports team
- Final boss (video games), the final opponent a player challenges in a video game
- Seung-hwan Oh (born 1982), South Korean baseball player
- The original name of the 2018 video game ZeroRanger
- Dwayne "The Rock" Johnson (born 1972), a known Hollywood actor and professional wrestler
- "Final Boss", a song by Marina from Princess of Power, 2025
- The main antagonist of a story
