= Sword Kladenets =

Magic sword in Russian fairy tales

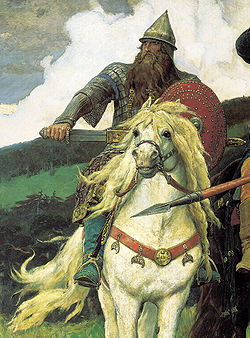
Detail of the painting The Bogatyrs by artist Viktor Vasnetsov depicting the medieval Russian knight Dobrynia Nikititch with a sword.

Sword Kladenets (also mech-kladenets; Russian: меч-кладенец. [mʲetɕ klədʲɪˈnʲets]) is a magic sword in Russian fairy tales and byliny (Russian epic poetry), rendered as "sword of steel", "hidden sword", or "magic sword" in English translations.

The "self-swinging sword" or mech-samosek (also mech-samosyok, самосёк. [səmɐˈsʲɵk]) is also regarded as equivalent by certain commentators, though others consider them to be distinct.

== Etymology ==
Max Vasmer's dictionary defines kladenets as a modifier designating a "magic sword in Russian tales", and the sword kladenets has been translated "magic sword" in texts.

The word "kladenets" can putatively be linked to the Slavic word klad (клад) "treasure, hoard," although "a number of philologists doubt" that this word-stem figures in the derivation of "[this] Russian epithet of this sword".

Some sources point out that kladenets sword, being a treasure, is frequently connected with the motif of being hidden inside a wall, under a rock, or under a sacred tree, waiting to be discovered by the bogatyr hero, and George Vernadsky goes as far as to translate the kladenets weapon as "the hidden sword". Although Vernadsky fails to elaborate, an alternative etymology connects the term kladenets to klast' (класть) "to lay or put", and his interpretation lies in this camp.

One rational explanation derives the word from uklad[ny] (укладъ, укладный) "steel" and kladenets is defined as meaning "made of steel" in the Dictionary of the Russian Language published by the Russian Academy of Sciences (and later in the Dictionary of archaic and obsolete words, published by Nauka). Hence some sources render "sword of steel".

Another explanation, credited to Alexander Veselovsky (1888), theorizes that kladenets may be a corrupted pronunciation of Kgl'arentsya or Kgl'adentsya (кгляренцыя, кгляренция or кгляденцыя, кгляденция), (Note: English romanization is reconstructed from German phoneticizations "kgl'arencyja" and "kgl'adencyja".) the sword of Bova Korolevich. The Russian tale of Bova was adapted from the medieval Italian romance of Buovo d'Antona, in which the original sword name is Clarença, or Chiarenza. This etymology has been endorsed by Max Vasmer's dictionary, under the entry that defines kladenets as a "magic sword in Russian tales", or "magic sword".

The corrupted form mech-kolunets (меч-колуне́ц) is also attested.

== Attestations ==
In some versions of the wonder-tale (skazka) concerning the bogatyr "Yeruslan Lazarevich", mech-kladenets is mentioned alongside the Fiery Shield and Flame Spear (Огненный Щит; Пламенные Копья).

The sword is mentioned in passing in the tale Storm-Bogatyr, Ivan the Cow's Son (Afanasyev No. 136) but plays no significant role in the tale.

== Samosek ==
While Vernadsky mentions "the self-swung sword" (mech-samosek) alongside mech-kladenets as commonplace elements in Russian folktales, he presents the swords as distinct from one another, since the kladenets sword needs to be wielded by a bogatyr.

Other sources however, present these two swords (mech-kladenets and mech-samosek) as equivalent, for example, a mythology dictionary with Yeleazar M. Meletinsky as supervising editor. The reasoning is not well-clarified, but this dictionary explains its view that kladenets (treasure) is often connected with the motif of being hidden inside a wall, and in the tale example it gives, the "Tale of the City of Babylon" (Skazanie o Vaviloné grade Сказании о Вавилоне-граде), the samosek-sword is also called "Asp The Serpent" (Аспид-змей), and it was ordered hidden inside the wall by the sword's owner, Nebuchadnezzar.

Elsewhere, the self-swinging sword under command of St. George beheads a Tatar tsar.

== See also ==
- Kusanagi no Tsurugi

== Bibliography ==
- Institut russkoy literatury (Pushkinsky Dom) Институт русской литературы (Пушкинский дом), ed. (2001). Byliny Pechory: Sever Yevropeyskoy Rossii Былины Печоры: Север Европейской России. Slovar' fol'klora Словарь фольклора. Vol. 2. Nauka. p. 602. ISBN 9785773501220. e-text [Institute of Russian Literature (Pushkin House) ed. (2001), Pechora Byliny: North European Russia (Dictionary of Folklore series, vol. 2), p. 602] (in Russian)
- Vasmer, Max (1967), Etimologicheskiy slovar' russkogo yazyka Этимологический словарь русского языка [Etymological dictionary of the Russian language] (in Russian), vol. 2, pp. 243, 244
- Vtorym Otdyleniem Imperatoskoy Akademii Nauk Вторымъ Отдѣленіемъ Императорской Академіи Наукъ, ed. (1906–1907). Slovar' russkago yazyka: K.-Kampilyt Словарь русскаго языка: К.-Кампилйтъ. Словарь. Vol. 4. Флегон Пресс. p. 917. [Second Section of the Imperial Academies of the Sciences ed. (1907), Dictionary of the Russian Language, Volume 4: K–Kampilyt, p. 917] (in Russian)
