= Simion Florea Marian =

Romanian folklorist and ethnographer (1847 - 1907)

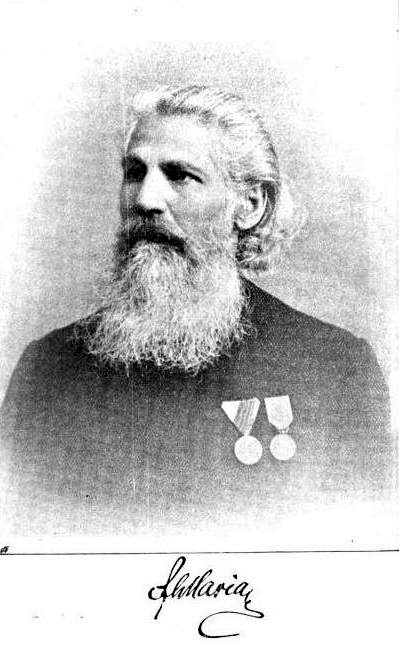
Simion Florea Marian

Simion Florea Marian (September 1, 1847–April 11, 1907) was an ethnic Romanian Austro-Hungarian folklorist, ethnographer, Eastern Orthodox priest and teacher, from the Duchy of Bukovina.

Born in Ilișești, a village southwest of Suceava, his parents were Grigore and Ruxandra (née Stanovici). He studied high school in Suceava, Năsăud and Beiuș, passing his Matura in 1871. From 1871 to 1875, he attended the Cernăuți theological institute. He then served as a parish priest at Poiana Stampei (1875-1877), Voloca (1877) and Siret (1877-1879). From 1879 to 1883, he taught catechism at Siret. He settled in Suceava in 1883, working as a teacher and, from 1894 until his death in his adopted city, a professor at the Higher Gymnasium. He was elected a titular member of the Romanian Academy in March 1881.

His first published work appeared in Familia magazine between 1866 and 1867: Datinile poporului român: o nuntă la Ilișești în Bucovina. He contributed to numerous magazines: Cărțile săteanului român, Amicul familiei, Gazeta poporului, Viața Românească, Junimea literară, Convorbiri Literare, Analele Academiei Române, Gazeta Transilvaniei, Calendarul Ligei, Aurora Română, Calendarul Bucovinei, Literatorul, Noua revistă română, Observatorul, Revista critică literară, Vatra, Calendarul diecezan, Amicul poporului, Calendarul poporului, Albina Carpaților, Calendarul gospodarilor, Cărțile săteanului român, Curierul literar, Epoca, Familia, Patria, Albina, Glasul Bucovinei, Lumea nouă, Reforma, Revista română, Tribuna and Revista pentru istorie, arheologie și filologie. Together with Teodor V. Ștefanelli, he founded Revista politică. He produced a large body of work on folklore and ethnography, in which traditional Romanian culture was first researched systematically. He collected folk songs, which he published in books.

His pioneering investigations into Romanian folklore appeared in book form as Descântece poporane române (1886) and posthumously as Păsările noastre și legendele lor. Works of synthesis that laid a foundation for Romanian ethnography include: Chromatica poporului român (1882), the first Romanian-language book of its kind; Ornitologia poporană română (two volumes, 1883), which won the Năsturel-Herescu Prize from the Romanian Academy and was the first of its type anywhere; and Insectele în limba, tradițiile și obiceiurile românilor (1903). He wrote thematic monographs on ethnography that went through multiple printings: Nunta la români (1890), Nașterea la români and Înmormântarea la români (both 1892). Between 1898 and 1901, he published the trilogy Sărbătorile la români: I. Cârnilegile, II. Păresimile, III. Cincizecimea, linked to the folk calendar. His history books include: Câteva inscripțiuni și documente din Bucovina (1885), Biserica din Pătrăuți (1887), Sf. Ioan de la Suceava (1895), Condica sfintei mănăstiri Voronețul (1900) and Domnia lui Ștefan voievod cel viteaz și a lui Ștefan Tomșa (1904). He was one of several authors who contributed to Die Bukowina (1888).
