= Orsat Ligorio =

Croatian and Serbian linguist and professor

- Born: July 14, 1985 (age 41); Dubrovnik, SR Croatia, Yugoslavia

Academic background
- Education: University of Zagreb (MA); University of Zadar (PhD); Leiden University (PhD)

Academic work
- Discipline: Linguist
- Sub-discipline: Indo-European linguistics
- Website: orsatligorio.academia.edu

Orsat Ligorio (Serbo-Croatian: [ǒrsat lǐgoːrio]; Serbian: Орсат Лигорио; born 14 July 1985) is a Croatian-Serbian linguist who is a professor of Ancient Greek and Sanskrit at the University of Belgrade and an author of a number of publications in Indo-European etymology.

== Life ==
Ligorio was born in 1985 in Dubrovnik, Yugoslavia. He obtained his MA in Classics and Linguistics from the University of Zagreb in 2009.

In 2010, he moved to the Netherlands where he would obtain his PhD from the University of Leiden in 2016. In 2014, he obtained another PhD from the University of Zadar.

He lives in Belgrade, is married, and works at the University of Belgrade teaching Ancient Greek and Sanskrit.

== Work ==
Ligorio has published two PhD theses and around 30 papers, which mostly focus on Indo-European and Romance linguistics. His work mostly deals with the topics in the history of the Serbo-Croatian accentuation, the reconstruction of the Phrygian and Dalmatian languages, and the reconstruction and etymology of the Indo-European proto-language.

In terms of Indo-European linguistics, he was influenced by his supervisors, Alexander Lubotsky and Frederik Kortlandt of Leiden University, and he adheres to the so-called Leiden School of reconstruction.

== Theses ==
- Serbo-Croatian Accent Retraction : Its Course and Character in the Dialect of Dubrovnik. Leiden: Leiden University, 2016.
- The issue of the stratification of Dalmatian Romance Lexicon [Problem leksičke stratifikacije u adrijatistici]. Zadar: Sveučilište u Zadru, 2014.

== Selected papers ==
- Proto-Indo-European 'Turn' and 'Snake'. Zbornik Matice srpske za filologiju i lingvistiku 62 1/2019, 7–16.
- with Alexander Lubotsky: Phrygian. Handbook of Comparative and Historical Indo-European Linguistics III, 2018, 1816–1831. (Eds. J. Klein, Brian Joseph, Matthias Fritz.)
- Vowel Breaking in Dalmatian Romance Derivatives in -ᴇʟʟᴜ, -ᴀ [Diftongacija u dalmatoromanskim reliktima latinskog sufiksa -ᴇʟʟᴜ, -ᴀ]. Južnoslovenski Filolog 74, 1–2/2018, 31–60.
- Greek Y in Dalmatian Romance. Ελληνική ετυμολογία / Greek etymology, 2017, 472‒495. (Επιμ. Χρ. Τζιτζιλής & Γ. Παπαναστασίου.)
- Old Phrygian totin. Lucida Intervalla 45/2016, 33–39.
- So-called Peudo-Yat in Dalmatian Romance and Balkan Latin [Takozvani pseudo-jat u dalmatskoj romanštini i balkanskom latinitetu]. Južnoslovenski Filolog 71 3-4/2015, 43–72.
