= Zmeu =

Fantastic creature of Romanian folklore and mythology

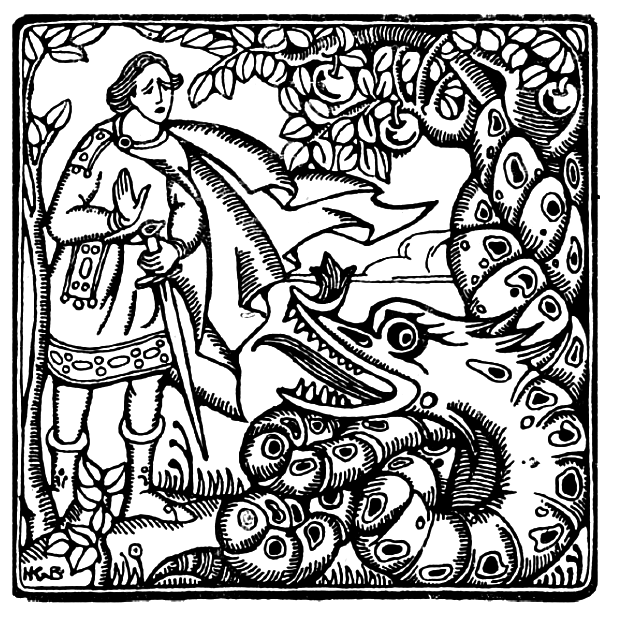
Făt-Frumos and a zmeu, art by Nadia Bulighin

The zmeu (plural: zmei, feminine: zmeoaică / zmeoaice) is a fantastic creature of Romanian folklore and Romanian mythology.

Though referred by some sources as a dragon, the zmeu is nevertheless distinct, because it usually has clear anthropomorphic traits: it is humanoid and has legs, arms, the ability to create and use artifacts such as weapons, and to ride a horse, and has the desire to marry young girls. There are commentators that class it as a giant (equivalent of an ogre), or a devil, or even a vampire.

In some stories, Zmeu appears in the sky and spits fire, or has the ability to change form. In other stories, it has a magical precious stone on its head that shines like the sun. It likes beautiful young girls, whom it kidnaps, usually for the purpose of marrying them. It is almost always defeated by a daring prince or knight-errant.

The zmeu has also been conflated with or confused with the dracu or with the balaur type dragon.

Various stories say that he is slain by a young prince, like Prâslea cel voinic(the mighty Prâslea)

== Etymology ==
Most scholars agree that the Romanian term zmeu derives from Slavic zmey. However, Václav Machek considered this problematic, leading to Romanian linguists Sorin Paliga and Eugen S. Teodor to propose the hypothesis of an early Slavic loan from the North Thracian language.

The relation with Romanian zmeură ‘raspberry’ has been deemed to be possible, but rather unlikely, by Alexandru Ciorănescu.

== Description ==
The zmeu is described by some as a "dragon", but a dragon that may assume the role of a suitor or a lover of a human woman, and in some cases are heroic figures, though in other cases, diabolical.

Thus zmeu has been noted to be "anthropo-ophidian", i.e., possessing both man and dragon/serpent-like features: a "scale-covered, human-like body, a snake's tail, and bat-like wings", or rather it is a "man's head" sitting on a "bird's trunk, [and a] serpent's tail", according to other accounts. (Note: This is a description of a creature identified as a zmeu, on a 15th century monumental stove tile, by art collector and folk art writer Barbu Slătineanu.)

Indeed, zmeu has been described as a sort of man-eating giant, an equivalent of the Western ogre, possessing a "rocky tail", but still able to mount a horse. The zmeu was no more than a creature with human-face, though somewhat taller and thicker-bodied, according to the assertions of some folklorists, and are capable of human speech, though in somewhat uncouth a fashion.

One paper categorized the zmeu among the Rumanian vampires, alongside the vârcolac (blood-drinking werewolf), but the latter tends to be confused more with the blood-sucking strigă (pl. strigoi).

The zmei are also confused with the balaur (dragon) among the populace. The flying creatures ridden by the Șolomonarii are the zmei, or the balaur, depending on the authority.

But in certain fairytales, the zmeu merely appears as a king of the serpents.

== Role and functions ==
The "zmeu" figures prominently in many Romanian folk tales as the manifestation of the destructive forces of greed and selfishness. Often, the zmeu steals something of great value, which only Făt-Frumos (the Romanian "Prince Charming"; literally: "handsome youth") can retrieve through his great, selfless bravery. For example, in the ballad of the knight Greuceanu, the zmeu steals the sun and the moon from the sky, thereby enshrouding all humanity in darkness. In the story of Prâslea the Brave and the Golden Apples, the zmeu robs the king of the precious "golden apples"; a parallel can be drawn to the German fairy tale The Golden Bird, the Russian Tsarevitch Ivan, the Fire Bird and the Gray Wolf, and the Bulgarian The Nine Peahens and the Golden Apples — although in all these other cases, the thief was a bird (nevertheless, in some versions of the Romanian story, the zmeu does transform into a bird to steal the golden apples). Usually, the zmeu resides in the "other world" (celălalt tărâm) and sometimes Făt-Frumos has to descend into his dark kingdom, implying that the zmeu lives underground.

The zmeu has a plethora of magical, destructive powers at his disposal. He can fly, shapeshift, and has tremendous supernatural strength. Ultimately, the abilities of the zmeu are of no avail, as Făt-Frumos defeats him through martial skill and daring.

The zmeu likes to kidnap a maiden to be his wife in his otherworldly realm. After Făt-Frumos slays the zmeu, he takes the maiden as his own bride-to-be. Similarly, like the giant in the popular British stories of Jack and the Beanstalk, the zmeu returns home to his fortress from his raids into human lands sensing that a human (Făt-Frumos) is lying in ambush somewhere nearby. A Zmeu is also sometimes pictured as a flame who goes in the room of a young girl or widow and once inside, becomes a man and seduces her.

There are people who have allegedly seen zmei flying through the sky. They are supposed to look like a living trail of fire, or fireworks.
