= Kapnobatai =

Name for ancient Mysian vegetarians

Kapnobatai or capnobatae (Ancient Greek: καπνοβάται; Latin: capnobatae), meaning 'those who walk on/in smoke/clouds', was one of the names given to the Mysians of Thrace (geographical and historical region in Southeast Europe, now split among Bulgaria, Greece, and Turkey, which is bounded by the Balkan Mountains to the north, the Aegean Sea to the south, and the Black Sea to the east) who practiced the dietary restriction of not consuming living things, thus living on milk and honey. The description is given by Strabo who attributes the information to Posidonius.

Mysians are understood as a people who originally from Asia Minor, but those living in Thrace have become confounded with the Getae, according to Strabo. As such, some commentators refer to them as Dacian priesthood.
