= Ailing =

Ailing may refer to:

- ailing in health, see ail (health)
- Ailing (Chinese name) (♀; given name; a.k.a. Ai-ling), several Chinese female given names
- Charles Ailing Gifford (♂; 1860–1937) U.S. architect
- Ailing Dojčin (♂) culture hero of Balkan epic poetry

== See also ==
- Gladys Li Ling-Ai (1908–2003; simplified Chinese: 李灵爱; traditional Chinese: 李靈愛; pinyin: Li Lingai; Wade–Giles: Lee Ling-ai) Chinese-American filmmaker
- Ai (disambiguation)
- Ail (disambiguation)
- Ing (disambiguation)
- Ling (disambiguation)
- Eileen (disambiguation), sometimes used as an anglicization of the Chinese Ailing
- Irene (disambiguation), sometimes used as an anglicisation of the Chinese Ailing
