= List of universities, colleges, and research institutions in Kyiv =

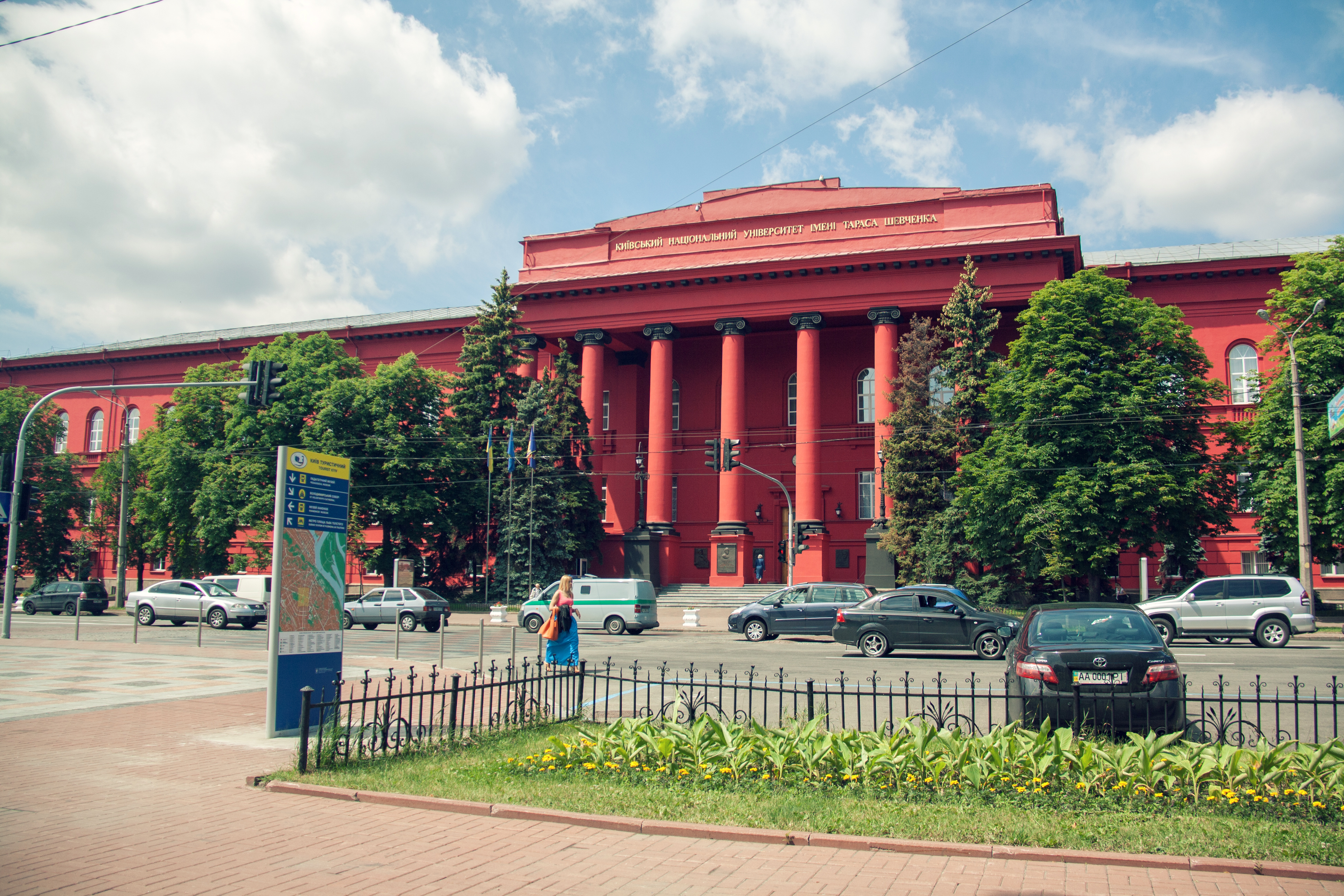
Taras Shevchenko University's original building, the "Red Building", today.

Kyiv has Ukraine's largest concentration of universities, colleges, and research institutions.

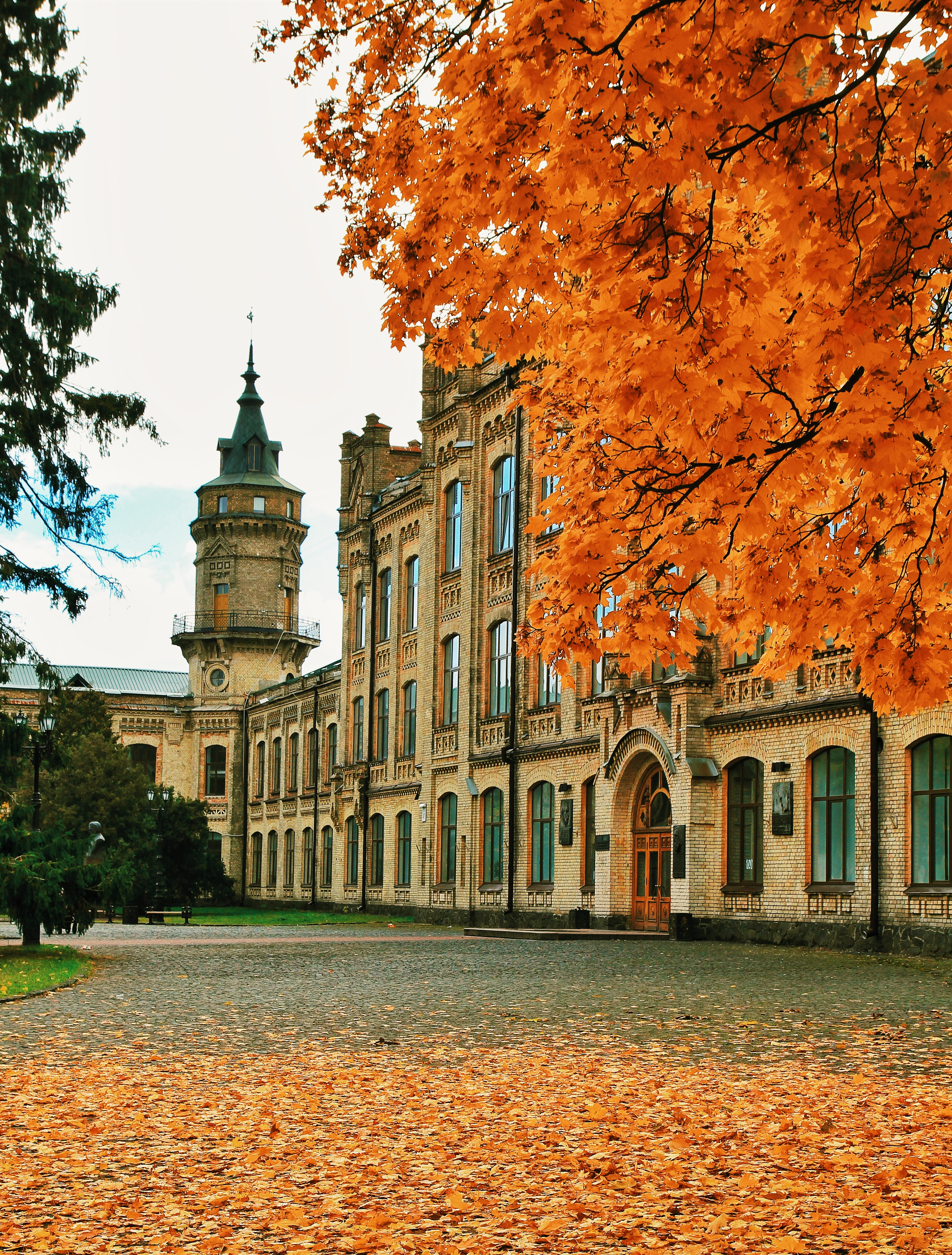
Igor Sikorsky Kyiv Polytechnic Institute

== Universities and Colleges ==
- Hrinchenko University
- Shevchenko University
- Aviation University
- University of Construction and Architecture
- University of Culture and Arts
- Cherniakhovsky University of Defense
- Hetman Economic University
- University of Economy and Technology of Transport
- University of Food Technologies
- University of Information-Communication Technologies
- International University
- University of Law
- University of Life and Environmental Sciences
- Linguistic University
- Bogomolets Medical University
- University "Kyiv-Mohyla Academy"
- Drahomanov Pedagogical University
- University of Physical Culture and Sports
- Technical University "Kyiv Polytechnic Institute"
- Kyiv Slavonic University
- International Solomon University
- Karpenko-Karyi University of Theater, Film, and Television
- University of Technologies and Design
- University of Trade and Economics
- University of Tourism, Economy and Law
- Transport University

=== Academies ===
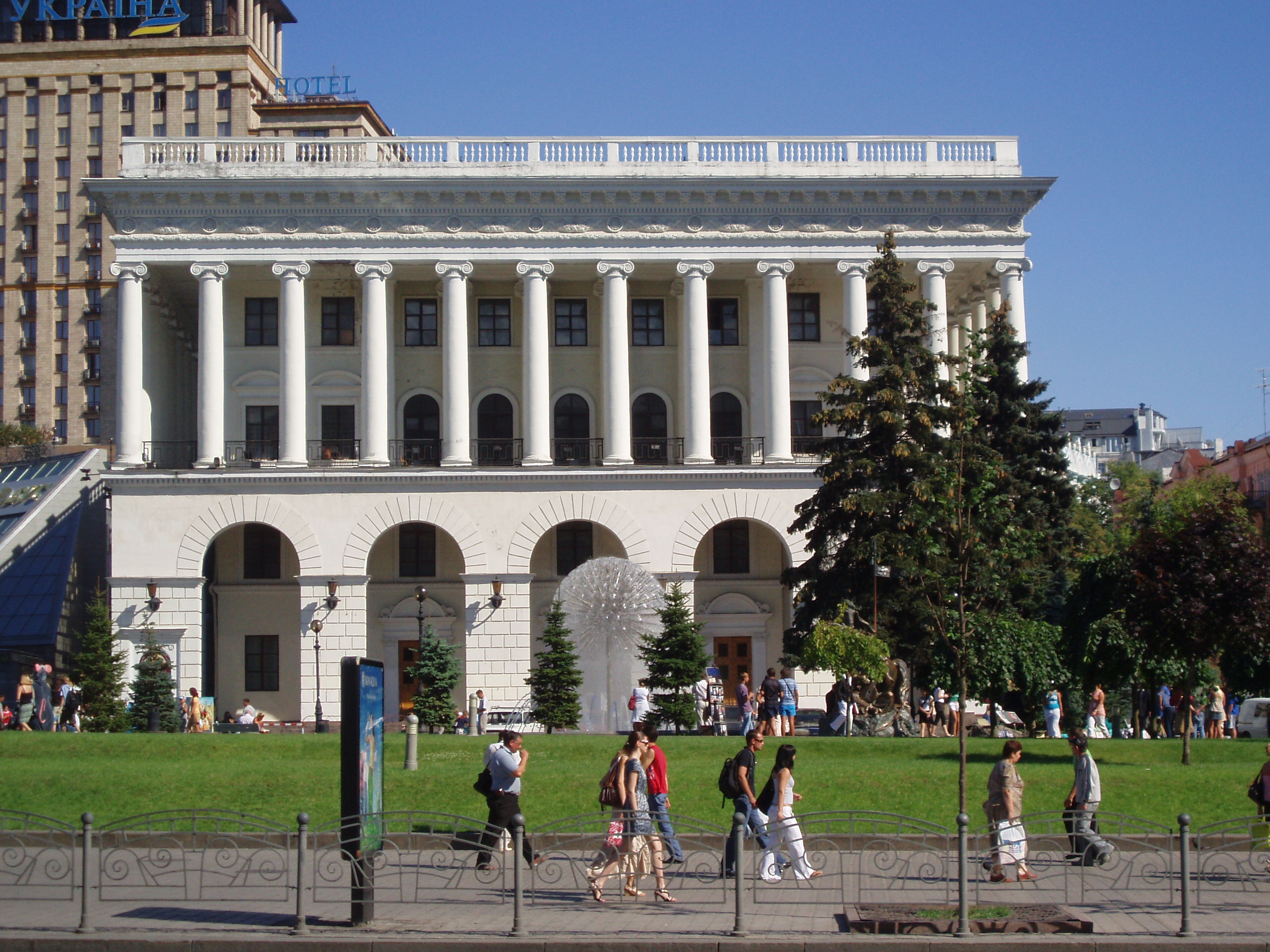
National Music Academy of Ukraine

- Academy of attorneys
- Academy of municipal administration
- Academy of Labor, Social Relations and Tourism
- Academy of Communal Economy
- Diplomatic Academy
- Children Academy of Arts
- Municipal Academy of Variety and Circus Arts
- Interregional Academy of Personnel Management
- Academy of State Administration
- Academy of Managerial Staff in Culture and Arts
- Academy of Visual Arts and Architecture
- Academy of Management
- Petro Chaikovsky National Music Academy of Ukraine
- National Academy of Agrarian Sciences of Ukraine

=== Institutes ===
- Institute of Decorative Applied Arts and Design
- St. Thomas Aquinas Institute of Religious Sciences
- Institute of Tourism

== Research institutions ==
- Bogolyubov Institute for Theoretical Physics
- Dobrov Center for Scientific-Technical Potential Research and History of Science
- Glushkov Institute of Cybernetics
- Holodny Institute of Botany
- Institute for Nuclear Research
- Institute of Cell Biology and Genetic Engineering
- Institute of Colloidal Chemistry and Chemistry of Water
- Institute of Environmental Geochemistry
- Institute of Gas
- Institute of Geochemistry, Mineralogy and Ore Formation
- Institute of Geography
- Institute of Geological Sciences
- Institute of History
- Institute of Mathematical Machines and System Problems
- Institute of Molecular Biology and Genetics of NASU
- Institute of Physics
- Institute of Plant Physiology and Genetics
- Institute of Renewable Energy
- Institute of World Economy and International Relations
- NASU Institute of Electrodynamics
- Kyiv Laboratory for Artificial Intelligence
- Ovcharenko Institute of Biocolloidal Chemistry
- Potebnya Institute of Ukrainian Language
- Shevchenko Institute of Literature
- Shmalhausen Institute of Zoology
- Skovoroda Institute of Philosophy
- Subbotin Geophysics Institute
- Ukrainian Space Research Institute
- Vernadsky National Library of Ukraine

== See also ==
- Open access in Ukraine
