= Ailing (Chinese name) =

- Gender: Feminine
- Language: Chinese

Origin
- Region of origin: East Asia, Southeast Asia

Other names
- Alternative spelling: Ailing, Ai-ling, Ai-Ling, Ai Ling, Oiling, Oi-ling, Oi-Ling, Oi Ling, Aileng, Ai-leng, Ai-Leng, Ai Leng
- Short form: Ai
- Pet name: Ling-ling
- Anglicisations: Aileen, Eileen, Irene

Ailing, Ai-ling, or, similar; is a female Chinese given name. It may be Anglicized as Eileen, Irene, or similar.

People with Chinese names variously romanized as "Ailing" or similar include:

== 愛玲 / 爱玲 ==
Ailing
- Traditional Chinese: 愛玲
- Simplified Chinese: 爱玲
- Literal meaning: Lovely
Transcriptions
Standard Mandarin
- Hanyu Pinyin: Ailing
- Wade–Giles: Ai-Ling
Yue: Cantonese
- Hong Kong Romanisation: Oi Ling

=== People ===
- Irene Ang (洪愛玲) beauty pageant contestant from Singapore at the Miss Chinese International Pageant 1993
- Eileen Chang (張愛玲; 1920–1995; as Zhang Ailing and Chang Ai-ling) Chinese-American author
- Eleanor Goodman (顾爱玲; as Gu Ailing; born 1979) U.S. translator of Chinese works
- Liu Ailing (刘爱玲; born 1967) Chinese soccer player
- Ong Ai Leng (王爱玲; born 1978; Wang Ailing) Malaysian actress
- Eileen Tung (童愛玲; born 1972), Taiwanese actress and contestant on Hong Kong TV show Beautiful Cooking
- Zhang Ailing (badminton) (张爱玲; born 1957), Chinese badminton player

=== Characters ===
- Mak Oi Ling (麥愛玲), fictional character from the television show Growing Through Life

== 愛凌 / 爱凌 ==
Ailing
- Traditional Chinese: 愛凌
- Simplified Chinese: 爱凌
- Literal meaning: Lovely
Transcriptions

- Gu Ailing (谷爱凌; born 2003 as Eileen Gu) American-Chinese freestyle skier

== 藹齡 / 蔼龄 ==
Ailing
- Traditional Chinese: 藹齡
- Simplified Chinese: 蔼龄
- Literal meaning: Kindly
Transcriptions

- Nancy Soong Ai-ling (宋藹齡; 1888–1973; also Ellen Soong) Taiwanese-Chinese businesswoman

== See also ==
- Gladys Li Ling-Ai (1908–2003; Chinese: 李靈愛) Chinese-American filmmaker
- Ai (disambiguation)
- Ail (disambiguation)
- Ing (disambiguation)
- Ling (disambiguation)
- Eileen (disambiguation), sometimes used as an anglicization of the Chinese Ailing
- Irene (disambiguation), sometimes used as an anglicisation of the Chinese Ailing
