= Ing (surname) =

Ing is a medieval English surname, of Norse-Viking origins, possibly from the name of the Norse god Yngvi or from someone living near an ing, a meadow. It can also be a romanisation of the East Asian surname Ng.

== Notable people with this surname ==
- Chloe Ing (born 1998), Singaporean figure skater
- David Ing (born 1958), Canadian engineer and systems scientist
- Dean Ing (1931–2020), American thriller and science fiction author
- Joe Ing (1890–1977), English footballer
- Nita Ing (born 1955), Taiwanese executive and the former Chairman of the Board of the Taiwan High Speed Rail Corporation
- Peter Ing (born 1969), former NHL goaltender
- Roger Ing (1933–2008), Chinese Canadian artist

== See also ==
- Ings (disambiguation)
