= Maying =

Maying may refer to:

== Places ==
=== In China ===
Gansu

- Maying, Longnan (马营), a town in Longnan
- Maying, Tongwei County (马营), a town in Tongwei County

Qinghai

- Maying, Minhe County (马营), a town in Minhe Hui and Tu Autonomous County
- Maying Township, Haidong (马营乡), a township in Haidong

Other provinces

- Maying Township, Hebei (马营乡), a township in Chicheng County, Hebei
- Maying, Jiangxi (马影), a town in Hukou County, Jiangxi
- Maying, Shaanxi (马营), a town in Baoji, Shaanxi
- Maying, Shandong (马营), a town in Liangshan County, Shandong
- Maying Township, Shanxi (马营乡), a township in Shanyin County, Shanxi
- Maying Township, Sichuan (麻英乡), a township in Wangcang County, Sichuan

== People ==
- Wong May Ing (Chinese: 黄渼沄; WONG Maying), Malaysian politician

== Other uses ==
- Maying, celebration of May Day, as in "Now Is the Month of Maying"

== See also ==
- Ma Ying (disambiguation) for people
- May (disambiguation)
- Ing (disambiguation)
- Ying (disambiguation)
- Ma (disambiguation)
