= Gradobranitelj =

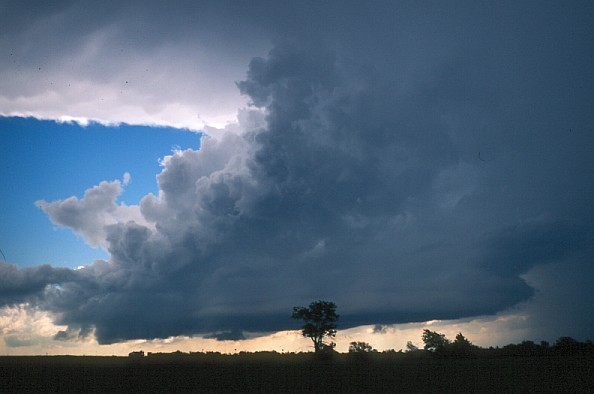
Cumulonimbus clouds are involved in thunderstorms, and can produce heavy rain and hail. It was believed that the movement of these clouds was directed by demons, who led them over fields to destroy crops.

A gradobranitelj (literally "hail defender") and an oblačar was, in Serbian tradition, a man who protected his village from destructive weather. In Serbia, bad weather was believed to be brought by various demonic beings, including devils, creatures called ala and aždaja, eagles, black-feathered birds, and the souls of drowned and hanged persons. The gradobranitelj used magic to dissipate hail clouds, and to repel devils and the souls of the drowned and hanged persons, who were thought to bring the clouds. He learned this magic from another gradobranitelj. The oblačar ran to and fro beneath a hail cloud, fighting against an aždaja, a serpentine demon which flew in the cloud spewing hail on the fields of the oblačar's village. The gradobranitelj is recorded in north-western Serbia, and the oblačar is recorded in the region of Syrmia. It was also believed in some areas that there were women who could eliminate the danger from destructive weather using sorcery. In other respects, these protectors were normal individuals who lived and worked in their communities as others did.

== Bringers of bad weather ==
Adverse weather such as storms, hail, or torrential rains could quickly devastate fields, orchards, and vineyards, and thus jeopardize the livelihood of farmers in the affected region. They were believed to have been brought by supernatural forces. God let bad weather afflict the people of an area as a punishment for their sins. Angels and some saints could punish in the same way, and the Devil was also thought of as a bringer of such afflictions. Female demons named ala were prominent bringers of storm and hail clouds in central, eastern, and southern Serbia, as well as in the Banat; the same role was sometimes played by eagles and black-feathered birds. In Syrmia, demons called aždaja spewed hail on crops flying through dense, terrible clouds. The elements could also be brought by the souls of drowned and hanged persons, or those struck by lightning. Living individuals, such as priests, witches, and those who had acquired certain magical skills were able to direct severe weather to the area whose people they wanted to harm. It was held in Bukovica and Lika that evil persons after death, or even during life, led hail to whatever field they wanted.

People supplicated God and saints for protection against those calamities, but they also resorted to magic practices. There was a widespread practice of "cutting" clouds and hail by means of an axe, scythe, sickle, hoe, or knife. Noticing the approach of a hail cloud, farmers would stand in their house yard and wave toward it with one of those implements, or place it with the blade turned toward the cloud. Some chased hail away by firing from rifles or small simple mortars called prangija. They also tried to propitiate the bringer of the elements, as in the custom of placing a dining table with bread and salt on it in the yard. The table could have been used for "cutting" as well, for which purpose it was placed with its legs directed skywards; the same was done with tripods. In other practices farmers used objects that had been part of annual festivities and family observances, counting on the protective influence of the sacred power with which these objects were consequently imbued. Some of the customs were performed only by women, others only by men, and still others by men and women together. The gender could depend on what object was used, e.g., the scythe was seen as a masculine tool and the sickle as a feminine one, but there were practices for which the gender was irrelevant.

Most of these practices were accompanied by a loud utterance of ritual texts, which had their own semantics, symbolism and structure. Standing in the yard and facing the cloud, farmers would address the cloud himself, or hail, prodigy, the unholy power, ala, drowned or hanged persons (usually calling by name someone like that from their region), and others. People tried to deflect the horrific bringer of clouds from their fields, by scaring him off with something even more appalling that was allegedly present in their village. For example: "Back! Back, ala! Here is a bigger ala, beware!" or "Hey, do not go, prodigy, on prodigy! We have a huge prodigy: here a girl bore a girl, a girl of nine years old! Do not go, prodigy, on prodigy: we have a huge prodigy!" These texts often contained the idea of hail clouds as cattle, usually white: "O Sava and Nevena, turn back those white cattle! There is no pasture for them here! We only have ashes to put their eyes out!" Uttering this, they would spill the ashes of the fire on which a česnica had been baked for Christmas, into the wind. (Sava and Nevena were a couple who drowned themselves in the Morava River for not having been allowed to marry.) Saint John and Saint Sava also appeared as leaders of cattle/clouds: "Saint Sava, turn back your cattle from our village!"

== Gradobranitelj ==
In Pocerina, the region containing Mount Cer in northwestern Serbia, protection from hail was provided by a gradobranitelj ("hail defender"), who learned the "craft" from another gradobranitelj. This type of protection included the use of magic. The gradobranitelj in the village of Lipolist was Nikola Stojković, who pursued that vocation for about forty years, until the 1950s. On the night before every bigger feast day, he collected earth and remnants of candles from graves of hanged and drowned persons, flour beneath a millstone, water beneath a water wheel, and dew. Nikola mixed all these ingredients into a mass, from which he made pellets the size of a hazelnut. At the same time he collected dew in a bottle. All the pellets and dew collected from Christmas to Christmas were placed in one bag and one bottle, respectively.

At the onset of a thunderstorm, according to Nikola's own description, he felt a great excitement; he heard some music in the thunder, all his muscles tightened, and something made him go. He would take a sickle and a scythe, a warp beam on which a twin sister had wound warp yarns, the bag with the last-year's pellets, and the bottle with last-year's dew. With this he would run directly toward the cloud, looking neither left nor right, nor watching where he treads. Once on the field, Nikola would stick the scythe into the ground, and say a prayer for lightning to strike. Having gone away from the scythe, he would make the sign of the cross with the warp beam in the direction of the cloud, to break it into quarters. Further beneath it, he would shake the cloud apart using the pellets and dew. There he also addressed the souls of the drowned and hanged leading the cloud, praying them that the "rain like this dew" fall, and spoke various other prayers. For these protective services, Nikola had been receiving wheat and maize from his fellow villagers. He was eventually warned by the authorities to stop with these activities, branded backward superstition by them.

The gradobranitelj in Bukor in the 1950s was Trivun Selenić. Perceiving that there might be hail, he would go behind the village, wave his arms toward the cloud, and speak the following (the meaning of the italicized words is unclear): "Raviše đaviše, nađuniši pistols, the dress on silver, the girl onto the neck! Barbarian's head smashed! I am the first voivode here. The dinner is not served for you here. Go there to those hills. It is served there for you. So dine there." Trivun explained that hail clouds were led by devils accompanied by souls of the drowned and hanged. By the statement "I am the first voivode here" he would proclaim that he was the principal commander of devils, who consequently had to obey his commands and proceed around his village. Trivun recognized that all this was a sin: both his declaring himself a voivode of devils, and averting hail from his village, because it would fall and make damage at some other place. Miljko Ivković from Dobrići spoke nothing, but went onto the field, took his cap off, made the Sign of the Cross, and put the cap back on. After that, he three times made the sign of the cross with a knife in the direction of the cloud, thus cutting it into quarters, which he then drove apart. In the end he stuck the knife's handle into the ground, the blade turned toward the cloud.

== Oblačar ==
In the region of Syrmia, people believed that dragons lived on high mountains and flew high in the sky shedding many sparks. Beneath them, in dense and terrible clouds, flew gigantic winged serpentine demons called aždaja, which spewed hail on fields. A special man, called an oblačar, would fight against them and their associates. This name is derived from the noun oblak ("cloud"). The oblačar would rush directly beneath the dark clouds, as soon as he noticed that they were gathering above the fields of his village. There he would run to and fro, following the movement of the aždaja, at the same time waving his arms, or holding a stick raised in the direction of the cloud. He would not stop until he was completely exhausted and drenched. Sometimes he succeeded in preventing hail fall, and other times not, as was the case with an oblačar from Mirkovci. When the wind blew the clouds away from Mirkovci without damage to its crops, this man would return from the fields and boast to the villagers of his persistence in warding off the hail bringers despite their ferocity. And when hail fell on the crops, he would humbly state that he did his best, but the adversaries flung themselves upon him with tenfold fierceness. The villagers believed and felt sorry for their oblačar, all drenched and bruised by hail. In autumn, he drove his cart from house to house in Mirkovci, receiving wheat from farmers for his struggle.

== Sorceress ==
Some women were thought to be able to eliminate the danger from destructive weather. This was the case with Stana Tomić, a healer from Jarmenovci in the municipality of Topola. Her fellow villagers held her in high esteem and claimed that she saved Jarmenovci from hail many times. At the sight of hail clouds, she would place the dining table at the center of her house, before putting on it a piece of bread, salt, and the lighted candle that had been used during the celebration of the slava. She would then go out into the yard and shout: "O Radomir, hanged man, lead the kolo around. Turn those white cattle back there, do not let them come here. Here is a bigger prodigy: a girl of seven years old bore a child, wrapped it in silken diapers, bound it with a silken ribbon. Do not let harm come to our vineyards, do not let harm come to our fruitful fields." In 1956, when this was recorded, Stana had been protecting Jarmenovci in this way for thirty years. In the regions of Takovo and Užice, people claimed that some villages had never been ravaged by hail, because in each of them there was a woman that prevented it.

== See also ==
- Zduhać
