= Ale (disambiguation) =

Ale is a fermented alcoholic beverage.

Ale or ALE may also refer to:

== Music ==
- Ale (album), 2008 album by Italian singer Alexia
- Ale (Polish for "But"), a 2012 album by Dorota Miśkiewicz
- "Ale", a song by Xiu Xiu from La Forêt

== People ==
=== Mononym ===
- Ale the Strong, legendary Scandinavian ruler
- Onela, or Åle or Ale, mythological Swedish king
- Ale Pyinthe (Saw Rahan II), a queen consort in the Pagan Dynasty of Myanmar

=== Given name ===
- Alê Abreu (born 1971), Brazilian film director and screenwriter
- Ale Ahmad Suroor, Urdu poet, critic and professor from India
- Ale de Boer (born 1987), Dutch football player
- Ale Dee, real name Alexandre Duhaime, Canadian rapper
- Alé Garza (born 1977), American penciler and comics artist
- Ale González (born 1994), Spanish football player
- Ale Kaho (born 2000), American football player
- Ale Möller (born 1955), Swedish musician and composer
- Ale Smidts (born 1958), Dutch organizational theorist

=== Surname ===
- Ale Vena Ale, Samoan politician
- Arnold Ale (born 1970), American football player
- Savali Talavou Ale, American Samoan politician

== Places ==
- Ale (woreda), Oromia Region, Ethiopia
- Ale Municipality, Västra Götaland, Sweden
- Ale Hundred, Västergötland, Sweden

== ALE as an abbreviation or code ==
- ale, ISO 939-2/3 language code for Aleut language
- .ale, filename extension for Avid Log Exchange file format
- Accumulated local effects, a machine learning interpretability method
- Annualized loss expectancy, in financial risk
- Apple Lossless Encoder, an audio coding format
- Application Level Events, an EPC/RFID standard
- IATA code for Alpine–Casparis Municipal Airport
- Arbitrary Lagrangian Eulerian, a material point method numerical technique
- Asymptotically locally Euclidean, a division of gravitational instanton
- Atomic layer etching, a technique in semiconductor device fabrication
- Automatic link establishment, an HF radio standard
- Hong Kong Advanced Level Examination, a standardized examination from 1980 to 2013
- Singapore-Cambridge GCE Advanced Level, a standardized examination in Singapore

== Other uses ==
- ALE (company) a heavy transport and lifting company
- Ala (demon), plural ale, mythological creatures of the Bulgarians, Macedonians, and Serbs
- Ale, a party for English morris dance sides
- Ale, a fish in the American television series FishCenter Live
- Ale language, a language of Ethiopia
- Wailapa language, also known as Ale, a language of Vanuatu
- "Ale" (song), Filipino song by Bodjie Dasig

== See also ==
- Ginger ale, a carbonated soft drink flavoured with ginger
- Parish ale, an English festivity at which ale was the chief drink
