= Ma Ying =

Ma Ying is the name of:

- Ma Ying (gymnast) (born 1971), Chinese gymnast
- Ma Ying (softball) (born 1972), Chinese softball player

== See also ==
- Maying (disambiguation) for places
- Ma Yin (853–930), late-Tang dynasty warlord and founding king of Ma Chu
