= Zduhać =

Legendary creature in Balkan folklore

A zduhać (Cyrillic: здухаћ, pronounced [zdǔxaːtɕ]) and vetrovnjak (ветровњак, [ʋetrǒʋɲaːk]) in Serbian tradition, and a dragon man in Bulgarian, Macedonian and southern Serbian traditions, were men believed to have an inborn supernatural ability to protect their estate, village, or region against destructive weather conditions, such as storms, hail, or torrential rains. It was believed that the souls of these men could leave their bodies in sleep, to intercept and fight with demonic beings imagined as bringers of bad weather. Having defeated the demons and taken away the stormy clouds they brought, the protectors would return to their bodies and wake up tired.

Notions associated with the zduhać, vetrovnjak, and dragon man, respectively, are not identical. The dragon man fought against female demons called ala, which led hail clouds over fields to destroy crops, and consumed the fertility of the fields. The zduhaći (plural) of an area usually fought together against the attacking zduhaći of another area who were bringing a storm and hail clouds above their fields. The victorious zduhaći would loot the yield of all agricultural produce from the territory of their defeated foes, and take it to their own region. The vetrovnjak, recorded in parts of western Serbia, fought against a bringer of bad weather imagined as a black bird. The zduhaći are recorded in Montenegro, eastern Herzegovina, part of Bosnia, and the Sandžak region of south-western Serbia. The dragon men are recorded in eastern Serbia, Banat, western Bulgaria, and Macedonia.

== Zduhać and vjedogonja ==
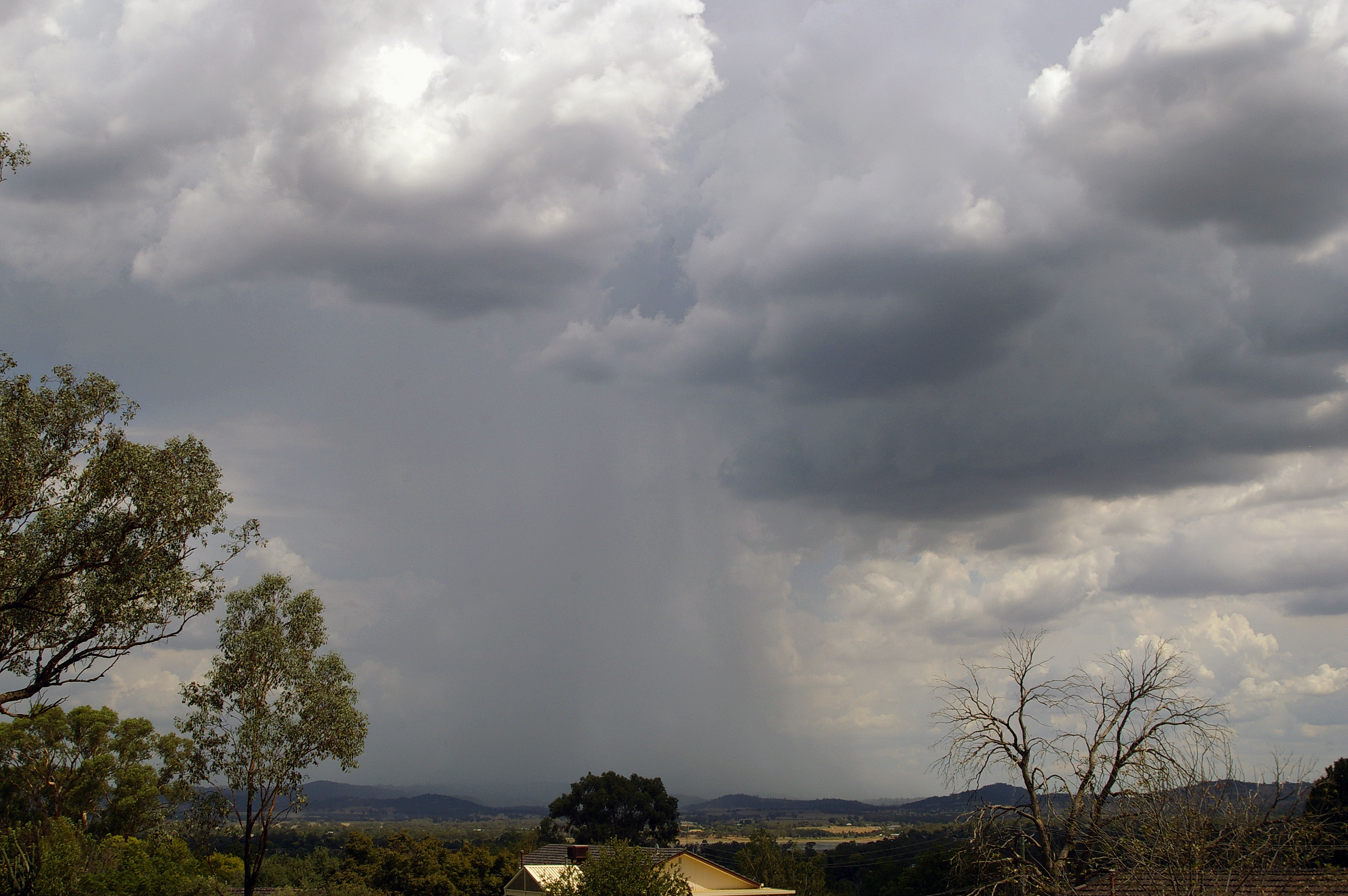
Cumulonimbus clouds are involved in thunderstorms, and can produce heavy rain and hail. It was believed that demons could lead these clouds over fields to destroy crops. The demons could be thwarted by men with supernatural properties.

In Montenegro, eastern Herzegovina, part of Bosnia, and the Sandžak region of south-western Serbia, a man who was thought to be able to protect his estate, village, or region from bad weather was called a zduhać or a stuha. These names have a number of variants, which can be with or without h, with v instead of h, with or without the ending ć, and with č instead of ć. According to philologist Franz Miklosich, the Serbian word stuhać is cognate with the Old Slavonic stuhia (стѹхїа) or stihia (стихїа) "the elements", which stem from the Old Greek stoicheion (στοιχεῖον) "element". The latter name is the origin of the Modern Greek stikhio (στοιχειό), denoting various kinds of spirits in Greek folklore, such as those fighting for the well-being of their village or area against adverse spirits from elsewhere. According to linguists Petar Skok and Norbert Jokl, stuhać stems from the Albanian stuhí/stihí "storm". In any case, the form zduhać may have resulted from folk etymology through association with the Serbian duh "spirit".

The notion that the human being consists of body and soul is found in traditional Slavic culture. There was a belief among the South Slavs that, in some people, the soul could leave the body and again return into it. The zduhać belonged to such people in Serbian tradition. It was thought that, after a zduhać fell asleep, his soul could fly out of his body, or "go into the winds", as it was said in Montenegro. In some accounts, it exited the body in the form of a fly. The zduhać's soul had the power to direct the motion of winds and clouds. If the body of the sleeping zduhać was rotated so that his head and feet changed places, or if he was carried away from where he had fallen asleep, his soul would not be able to return into his body, and the zduhać would die.

Although zduhaći (plural) could be women and children, most were adult men. Their supernatural power was thought to be inborn. In many regions it was regarded that the zduhaći were born with a caul—white or red, depending on the regional belief. The mother would dry the caul and sew into a piece of garment always worn by the child, such as a pouch attached under the child's armpit. In the clan of Kuči, eastern Montenegro, the mother would preserve the caul hiding it from all eyes, and hand it to her son when he grew up. The caul was supposed to protect him when he flew as a zduhać. If the caul was destroyed, the child's supernatural power would be lost. A birthmark of a zduhać in Herzegovina could be a tuft of hair growing on his shoulder or upper arm. In Montenegrin Littoral, the caul played no role in the birth of zduhaći, who were rather born on certain Fridays at a set hour. There was also a belief in Herzegovina that male children who were conceived on the eves of great feast days would become zduhaći.

A 19th-century ethnographic account from eastern Herzegovina describes a way through which a man who was not born as a zduhać could become one. Forty days after he ceased praying to God and washing his face, the man should go to some level ground, before he drew a circle on the ground and sat in its centre. Soon the Devil would come and ask the man whether he was willing to join his army, and what form he wanted to be transformed into. When the man stated the desired form, the Devil would turn him into that, making him a zduhać. In the region of Semberija, northeast Bosnia, а zduhać could pass his supernatural power on to his son.

The appearance of zduhaći was not much different from that of ordinary people, but they had some traits that set them apart. They were deep sleepers, very hard to wake up, often drowsy, pensive, thoughtful, and solemn. Their faces were often puffy, eyes shadowy. They were wise and shrewd, successful in whatever they were doing and resourceful in dealing with problems; their households were prosperous. In Semberija, zduhaći were said to be good scapulimantic diviners, and to be able to communicate with domestic animals. The clan of Paštrovići from Montenegrin Littoral claimed that the zduhaći could hear any doings anywhere in the world; if someone stepped on a zduhać's foot, they could hear that too. The clan of Kuči held that the zduhaći were outstanding long jumpers.

Adverse weather such as a storm or hail could devastate crop fields and orchards, and thus jeopardize the livelihood of farmers in the affected area. A role of zduhaći, according to folk tradition, was to lead storms and hail clouds away from their family estates, villages, or regions, to save their crops. A zduhać could take the storms and hail clouds over the territory of another zduhać to destroy its crops. The other zduhać would fly up to confront the bringer of bad weather, and there would be a fight between the zduhaći.

They fought alone, or in bands composed of individuals from the same area. Thus it was thought that the zduhaći from eastern Bosnia fought together against those from Herzegovina and Montenegro. The zduhaći from Sandžak fought jointly against the Albanian zduhaći. On the Adriatic coast, battles were waged between a band of zduhaći from Herzegovina, Serbia, Montenegro, and northern Albania on one side, and a band of zduhaći from Apulia in southeast Italy on the other side. The latter were also called the transmarine zduhaći, as Apulia is situated across the Adriatic Sea from Montenegro. Each band had its leader. A man named Mato Glušac (1774–1870), from the village of Korita in Herzegovina, was reputed the supreme commander of the Herzegovinian and Montenegrin zduhaći; he was also a famous seer.

According to some accounts, zduhaći flew and fought mostly in spring when strong winds blew, and, as held in some regions, only during night. As recorded in Montenegro, the zduhaći "went into the winds" usually during the Nativity Fast (15 November – 24 December), when there was not much snow and the winds were forceful. They also flew frequently from mid-February to the end of March. In some years, they were not active at all.

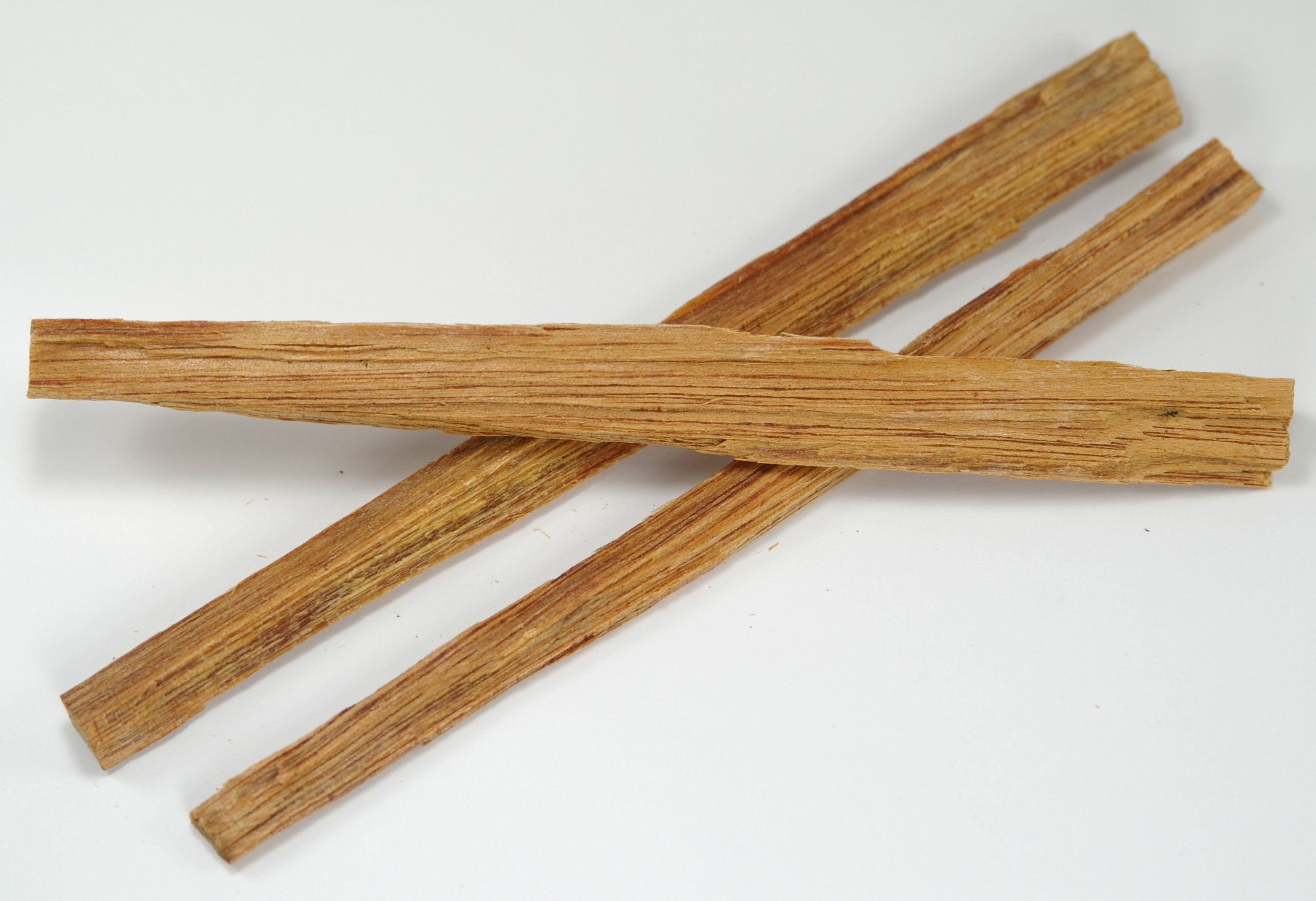
A stick of luč (fatwood) could be turned into the most powerful zduhać weapon if it was charred at both ends.

The zduhaći of a band would leave their bodies in sleep and gather at an appointed place, before flying into a battle. They used various weapons, such as spindles, beech buds, sharp splinters, leaves, stalks of straw, fluff, flakes, sand, long twigs, cornel stones, pine cones, eggshells, and other light objects. As believed in Herzegovina, zduhaći uprooted gigantic firs and oaks and fought with them. However, the most powerful zduhać weapon was held to be a stick of luč (resinous wood burned to give light or used as kindling) charred at both ends, or any charred splinter of wood. A zduhać who was hit with this weapon would surely die. People therefore avoided igniting the sticks at both ends, and they took care that no splinters were left half-burned.

Beside the weapons, each zduhać carried a milk bucket and a peck measure; an alternative for the latter could be a shovel or broom from a threshing floor. If a band of zduhaći succeeded to seize the peck measures from the enemy band, they would thereby transfer the crop yield from the area of their enemies to their own area. Seizing the milk buckets meant that the milk yield would be transferred. According to the clan of Kuči, zduhaći used their peck measures, milk buckets, and other containers to grab off the overall yield of the enemy territory.

The battles of zduhaći were furious. They were accompanied by forceful gales and whirlwinds which uprooted trees and whipped up dust. In Montenegro, it was considered dangerous to throw stones in the wind, because that might knock out an eye of a zduhać, who would kill the culprit. A fighting zduhać was supposed to retain his peck measure and milk bucket, while trying to seize these objects from an enemy zduhać; he should hit and not get hit. The victorious band of zduhaći would loot the yield of all agricultural produce from the territory of their defeated foes. The harvest in the coming season would thus be excellent for the victors and poor for the defeated zduhaći.

After the battle, the soul of the zduhać would return into his body, and he would wake up weak and exhausted. If he was wounded, he would be sick for some time afterwards—before he recovered, or died if his wound was mortal. There are records of seriously ill men who claimed that they were wounded in zduhać battles. It was held in Montenegrin Littoral that a mortally wounded zduhać could still recuperate if he revenged himself on his wounder before the eighth day of his wound expired. Pavel Rovinsky, Russian philologist and ethnographer, recorded a story told to him by a man of the clan of Ceklin in southern Montenegro (Rovinsky also heard a similar story in Montenegrin Littoral):

There was a Ceklin zduhać who was so beaten by other zduhaći that he had to die, and there he was, dying. Various remedies were brought to him, but he accepted none, because all was in vain. Finally he had everybody ushered out of his house, except for one of his brothers, a famous hero; all were also driven away from the door, to prevent eavesdropping. Then the dying man said to his brother: "I will surely die, if I am not substituted for; and you can do it and save me, if you will have enough strength." The brother, of course, promised that, and the sick man continued: "You will have to go tonight to Mount So-and-so, at three to four hours' walking distance from here, most of the way lying through a dense forest. You will come beneath a stair-like cliff and stop there, and a great fear will seize you. To encourage yourself, take your two pistols and a knife with the silver sheath." "I will also take a musket," added the brother, and the sick man said, "You may take that too, though only as an encouragement, as it will be of no use to you, but you must have the knife." "I can go without any weapon, with a pocket knife, if it is against a single, and with a weapon I can go against a hundred," interrupted the brother again. "Take it easy with your boldness," resumed the sick man, "and by all means take the knife. When you come beneath the cliff, the sky will be cloudless, lit, and there will be a silence in the air; then you will notice a wisp of cloud coming from the direction of Mount Rumija, and the wind will start to blow. The wisp will turn into an enormous storm cloud that will cover all the sky, and there will come a darkness such as you have never seen before; the wind will blow, whistle, roar, and shriek, as you have also never heard before; the hair will rise on your head so that it will lift your cap, and I fear that you may go mad from horror. And if you persevere, you will see three bulls falling down from the cloud on the earth: a light-haired, a pied, and a dark-haired bull. The latter two will start to beat the former, which is the weakest, because it is already wounded. Make sure to strike the two bulls with the knife; but take care not to cut the light-haired bull; that would be the death of me, as it would be if the two bulls overcame the light-haired bull."

Having heard all of that, the brother took two pistols, poured more gunpowder, and sharpened the flints; he put the pistols into his belt, placed the knife between them, and slung a musket over his shoulder. He set forth. He passed through the dark forest; he came beneath the stair-like cliff; the moon and the stars were shining, so it was like a day; a silence all around him, pleasant; he sat down and lit his pipe. Before long a wisp of cloud showed from the direction of Mount Rumija; there came a roar and bluster, and everything happened as the sick man said. His hair rose so that three times he jammed his cap down on his head. Finally, three bulls fell down from the storm cloud and started to fight; all as it was said. He stabbed the pied bull in the neck with the knife; it staggered and fell; the light-haired bull got encouraged. Then he stabbed the dark-haired bull, and it slumped; the light-haired was finishing them off with its horns. This was not enough for him, and, fearing that the cut bulls could still rise up, he kept on striking them with the knife as long as there was a breath in their bodies. The storm cloud suddenly disappeared; together with it, the light-haired bull vanished. Again the moon and the stars shone; again a silence and blessedness. He was going back home as if flying; when he arrived he found his brother sitting by the hearth, placing logs on the fire, healthy as if he had never been sick.

An interpretation of the story about the Ceklin zduhać is given in an essay by literary theoretician Radoman Kordić. According to him, the story is a product of the symbolic scheme of the culture of Montenegrin Serbs. The story comprises a zduhać narration and a heroic narration. The former is based on the mythological beliefs in the zduhaći, which were strongest in Montenegro. The latter is based on the heroic ideology exalting death in battle, which was a predominant trait of the Montenegrin society. The zduhać and the famous hero symbolize, respectively, two systems of the Montenegrin culture. At its beginning, the story is placed in the framework of the first system, but it is realized with the means and on the ideological plane of the second system. The beaten zduhać, who is supposed to die, diverges from the mythological pattern, and he replaces himself with the hero. This results in an ironic twist. The fearless hero acts in fact as a butcher of bulls which do not even fight back. The apparently happy ending degrades the zduhać into a subject without identity. Kordić argues, using mostly Lacanian psychoanalysis, that there is a third, silent narration in the story—that of the death drive—which crumbles the other two narrations.

In a story recorded in the area of Cetinje, a zduhać was mortally wounded on Mount Lovćen in a battle against the transmarine zduhaći. The dying zduhać disclosed the way in which he could be saved, and one of his relatives acted according to the instructions. He went by night to a valley where he saw horses, oxen, rams, billy goats, men, and women. He passed by them in total silence, before he saw a black ox. He struck the ox with a wooden bar, and the animal roared tremendously. When he returned home, he found the zduhać sound and healthy. As believed in the region of Birač, eastern Bosnia, a mortally wounded zduhać could get well if he burned beech buds in a milk bucket, and censed himself with the smoke, using a spindle to wave the smoke toward himself. Before performing this rite, he should have publicly confessed that he was a zduhać. Most zduhaći would reputedly rather die than do that, because afterwards they could no more fly as zduhaći. As thought in Herzegovina, a man who did not want to be a zduhać anymore, should have confessed to a priest and promised that he would not fly anymore.

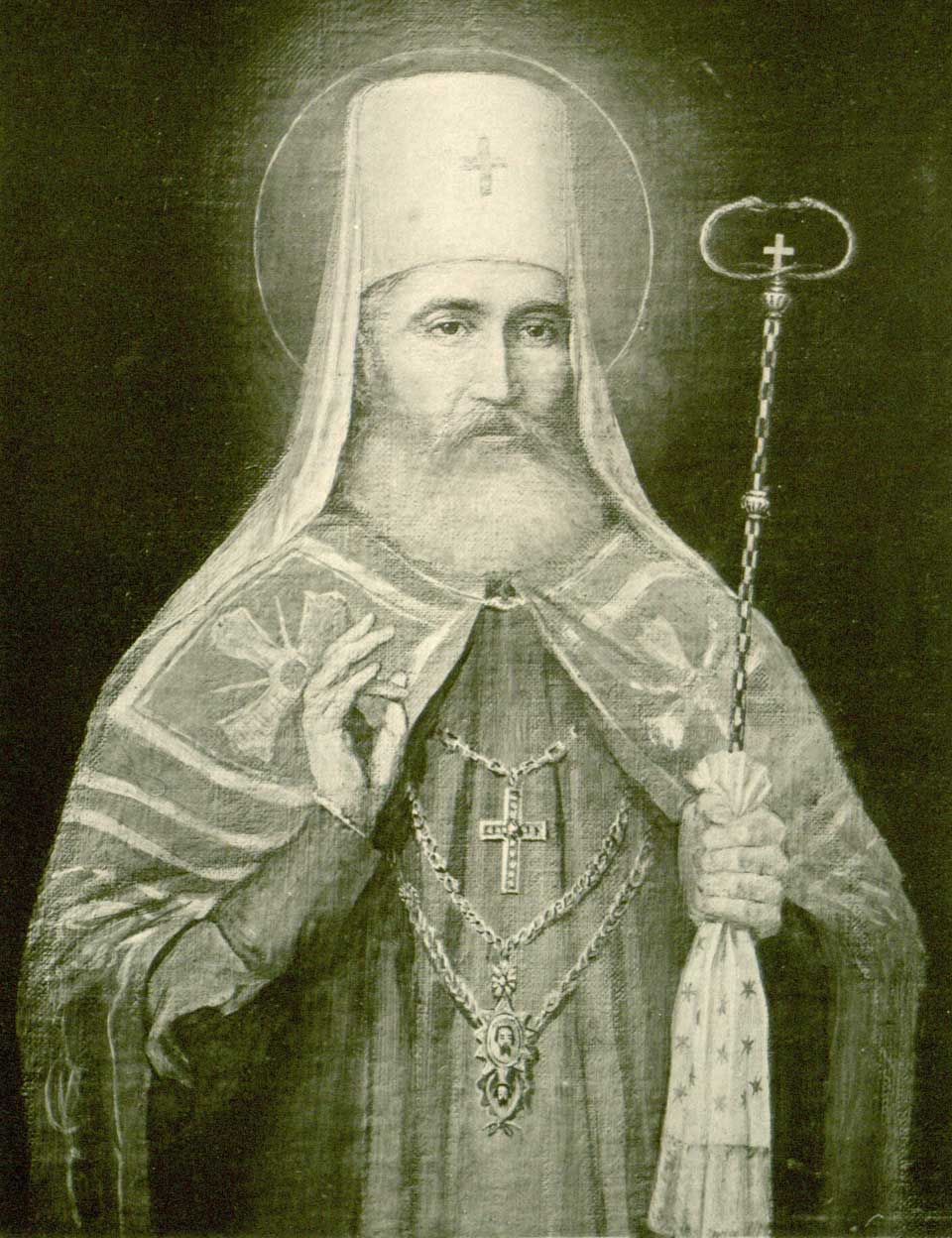
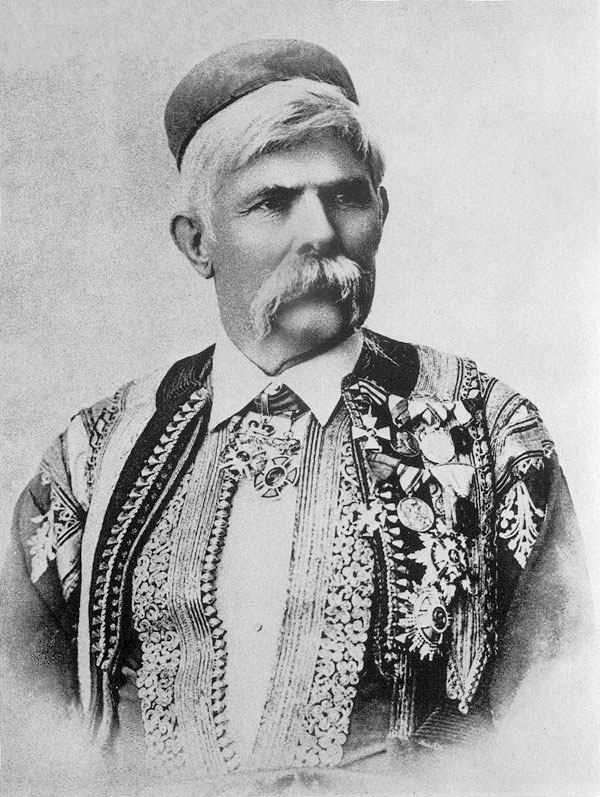
Some influential men such as Petar I Petrović-Njegoš and Marko Miljanov had been popularly regarded as zduhaći.

Zduhaći were regarded as a blessing for their home and village, as guardians of the prosperity and well-being of their region, and as good, honest, just, and law-obeying people. In the region of Birač, zduhaći were said to meet with angels "on the leaves of high and thick branches". They were sometimes thought to have a prophetic gift. However, a zduhać could ally himself with the Devil, and use his innate power in accordance with the Devil's directions. That zduhać was doomed to turn into a vampire, unless he confessed and repented. Some influential historical persons were believed to have been zduhaći, such as warrior and writer Marko Miljanov, and Petar I Petrović-Njegoš, who was the Prince-Bishop of Montenegro from 1784 to 1830.

Mahmud Bushatli, the Ottoman pasha of Skadar in northern Albania, was reputed a powerful zduhać in Montenegro. It was claimed that his mother carried him for three years. Bushatli was defeated and killed by the Montenegrins under Petar I, while attempting to subdue them in 1796. Since that time, the crop yield in Montenegro and northern Albania was allegedly not as high as before. Bushatli was said to have fought for the crop yield against the transmarine zduhaći. Petar I was reported saying of him, "I regret his death although he was my biggest enemy." After Bushatli was killed, his body was burned; according to oral accounts, green flames rose from it. In South Slavic tradition, green could be associated with supernatural creatures, like witches and dragons.

An individual domestic animal could also be regarded as a zduhać, such as a shepherd dog, ox, bellwether, horse, or billy goat. If an animal habitually made vocal sounds in sleep, it was assumed to be a zduhać. Such an animal was cherished, and was not for sale. The spirit of the animal zduhać would leave its body in sleep and fight against the enemy zduhaći, to protect its own flock or herd. Only the fertility of the livestock depended on the outcome of the battles fought by the animal zduhaći; they had no bearing on the crop yield. In the region of Užice, western Serbia, it was believed that storms and hail clouds were led by zduhaći who flew above them in the form of big birds. A black ox and a three-year-old rooster defended their village from them—especially the rooster, for which reason he was not killed for food, but kept as a home guardian. In folk spells for repelling hail clouds in Serbia, these clouds were called white cattle. This could be compared with the idea of the black ox as a defender from hail.

In some regions of southern Montenegro, such as the Bay of Kotor, Grbalj, and Zagarač, and in parts of Herzegovina, a man who acted as a zduhać was called a vjedogonja or jedogonja. There was a rule: if a child was born with a caul, the girl would become a vještica "witch", and the boy would become a vjedogonja. This could have been prevented by cutting the caul on a trough for feeding dogs, and throwing it away; the child would then grow up into an ordinary person. While the zduhaći and vjedogonje (plural) protected their community from the threats coming from the outside, the witches were the enemy within, doing harm primarily to their own relatives and friends. A correspondence between the witches and the vjedogonje can be seen in a passage from The Mountain Wreath, a poetic drama by Petar II Petrović-Njegoš, the plot of which takes place in 18th-century Montenegro:

Бог са нама и анђели божји!
А ево си удрио, владико,
у некакве смућене вјетрове,
ка у марчу кад удри вјештица
ал' у јесен мутну вједогоња.

God and His angels be with us!
Why here you have dashed, O Bishop,
into some confused winds,
like a witch when she dashes in March
or a vjedogonja [when he dashes] in the gloomy autumn.

A man named Vukota said these words to Bishop Danilo, one of the main characters of The Mountain Wreath, who previously uttered a piercing vision speaking as if he was alone. The second and the third verses can be compared with an idiomatic expression whose literal sense is "to dash into a frenzied countenance", meaning "to fall into a frenzied or crazed exaltation". Vukota compared Bishop Danilo's exaltation with that of a witch or a vjedogonja when their spirit flew out of their body. It was thought that the witches held an assembly each year on 1 March, and the vjedogonje mostly flew during the long autumn nights, especially when strong winds blew. After Vukota's words, Bishop Danilo started as if from a dream.

The vjedogonje fought in regional bands, their weapons being huge boulders or gigantic trees which they uprooted with one hand. The leaders among them were those who had a tail and were hairy. A 19th-century ethnographic account describes that "when a man regarded as a vjedogonja dies, they drive hawthorn spines under his nails, and cut the tendons beneath his knees with a knife whose sheath is black, so that he could not get out of his grave (like a vampire)."

Petar I Petrović-Njegoš preached among people against superstition. He strongly condemned the denunciation and persecution of women as witches. After one such incident in 1830 in south Montenegro, Petar I wrote an epistle, mentioning vjedogonje in a sentence: "Nowhere have I found nor has anyone told me that witches and vjedogonje exist, except in the blind and sad Serbian people, because it is blind and believes lies rather than Christ's Gospel and Christ's teachings and commands."

In the folklore of Croats of Ravni Kotari, a region in northern Dalmatia, there were men called vidogoja. They were believed to know past and future things. People paid them to cure the sick, which they did by saying prayers and making the sign of the cross all over the patient's body. The vidogoja were also thought to be able to inflict diseases on people, and to have evil eyes. They could not fly.

== Vetrovnjak, vilovit, and oblačar ==
In the region of Mount Zlatibor in western Serbia, the man who protected the fields of his village from bad weather was called a vetrovnjak; the name is derived from vetar "wind". At the onset of a storm, the vetrovnjak would fall into a trance-like sleep. It was thought that his soul then flew skywards to fight against some black bird which led the storm and hail clouds. After he woke up, he had to rest for some time to restore his physical strength. It was believed that a vetrovnjak could take the bad clouds over the estate of a man with whom he was in a conflict.

In the region of Dragačevo, western Serbia, people told of the vilovit men, who would disappear at the sight of hail clouds, reappearing bloody and with torn clothes after the storm was over. Asked where they had been to, they would only answer that they had gone to fight against those who led the hail clouds toward their village. The adjective vilovit means "having a vila's properties" or "vila-like". The name vila denotes Slavic nymphs or fairies, female anthropomorphic spirits of woods, mountains, clouds, and waters, who had magical powers. In the region of Tamnava, north-western Central Serbia, the vilovit men were also called vetrenjaks. An early mention of vetrenjaks is found in a short story by Serbian writer Milovan Glišić, published in 1875. In the story, men from Krnić and nearby villages talk about a battle their vetrenjaks fought on a hill to repel a hail storm brought by alien vetrenjaks. They uprooted oaks and beat each other with them, their bodies turning black and blue from the blows. The defenders were victorious and moved the storm to a mountain, away from their fields.

Serbian writer Janko Veselinović was well acquainted with the folklore of Tamnava, where he worked as a teacher in a village. In his short story published in 1888, an elderly woman talks to him about various supernatural beings, including her co-villager Petar, a vetrenjak: "As soon as he perceives a greyish cloud and hears thunder, Petar leaves whatever he may be doing, and goes somewhere. He runs so fast that no biped can overtake him. After he passes the cloud, he comes back naked and blue as indigo. Then he has to stay in bed for a week. And do you know why he is like that? He told me. The pogibaoci [hanged and drowned people] from surrounding villages drive the clouds toward our village, and Petar will not let hail beat us. He fights with them until he will overpower them, or they him... [Petar said] 'We uproot oaks, as one would pull onion bulbs from the ground, and beat each other with them.'"

A vetrenjak from the village of Trlić had reportedly claimed that he clashed with oxen and rams led by devils whose aim was to discharge hail over his village. Seeing hail clouds, people in Tamnava would shout, "Keep your cattle out of our crops!" Thus they addressed hanged and drowned persons who were imagined to fly before the clouds and lead them. Farmers avoided leaving a harrow on the field, as they thought that the hail-bringing devils could slam it on the head of the vetrenjak who defended the village. People behaved amicably toward vetrenjaks, but they warned their children to keep off from them, as these men had "business with devils". In 2004, ethnographers interviewed elderly people in a group of hamlets south-west of the town of Valjevo, who defined the vetrenjak as a man able to direct the movement of clouds. When such a man died, the wind would suddenly start to blow and clouds would loom. The term vetrenjak also designated a man who could fly invisible, which he usually did by night. He was born with a caul which was thrown away and eaten by birds.

In the folklore of Serbs in the region of Syrmia, protection from hail was provided by the men called oblačars; the name is derived from oblak "cloud". The oblačar would rush directly beneath a dark cloud, as soon as it appeared above the fields of his village. There, he would run to and fro, waving his arms or holding a stick raised in the direction of the cloud. He would not stop until he was completely exhausted and drenched. In this way, the oblačar fought against a gigantic serpentine demon called aždaja, which was thought to fly accompanied by its retinue in low dark clouds, spewing hail from its broad muzzle. If the cloud moved away from his village without discharging hail, it meant that the oblačar had overpowered the aždaja and its retinue. An oblačar in the village of Mirkovci annually received wheat from his co-villagers as a reward for his struggle.

== Dragon man ==
The men who defended their village from bad weather were referred to as dragons in eastern and southern Serbia, western Bulgaria, and Macedonia. In Serbia, they were also called zmajevit "having a dragon's properties", from zmaj "dragon". The mythological dragon was imagined as a fiery creature with wings, usually having a snake-like shape; he could also take the form of an eagle or a man. Each dragon had his own territory, within which he dwelt by a forest spring or stream, in the hollow trunk of a beech tree, or in a mountain cave. He was benevolent toward the humans, and he took care that his territory received the right amount of rain at the right time, for good growth of the crops. His arch-enemy was a female demon named ala (plural: ale), whose main activity was to lead storm and hail clouds over fields to destroy crops. The ale also consumed the fertility of the fields. Whenever he noticed an ala approaching, the dragon would fly up into the clouds to fight against the demon and chase her away. He shot fiery arrows and stones at her, which produced lightning and thunder. In the regions where people believed in the zduhaći, the dragon was a highly regarded mythological being, but he was not associated with the crops and their protection from demons. Similar was the case in other than western regions of Bulgaria.

The dragon man was believed to act in a manner similar to that of the mythological dragon: as soon as he saw bad weather approaching, which he knew was brought by an ala, he would leave whatever he was doing, and fly up to confront the demon. This he did by falling into a deep sleep, or entering a state similar to death, usually at the very spot where he happened to be at that time. His soul then left his body in the form of a snake or a lizard, and soared skywards. It was claimed that he was not breathing as long as his soul was absent from his body. The battle could last for a whole day, or even for several days, during which time the man lay unconscious, sweating profusely from the exertion of the fight. There was a danger that, during the course of the battle, the ala might approach the man's body and harm him, which could be prevented by someone swinging a blade above him, or by sticking the blade at the lying man's head. He should not be pushed or moved while in this state: if he was not in the same position as when he fell asleep, his soul would not be able to return into his body, and he would die. When he woke up after the battle with the ala, he was very tired. Apart from these characteristics, the dragon man was seen as an ordinary human.

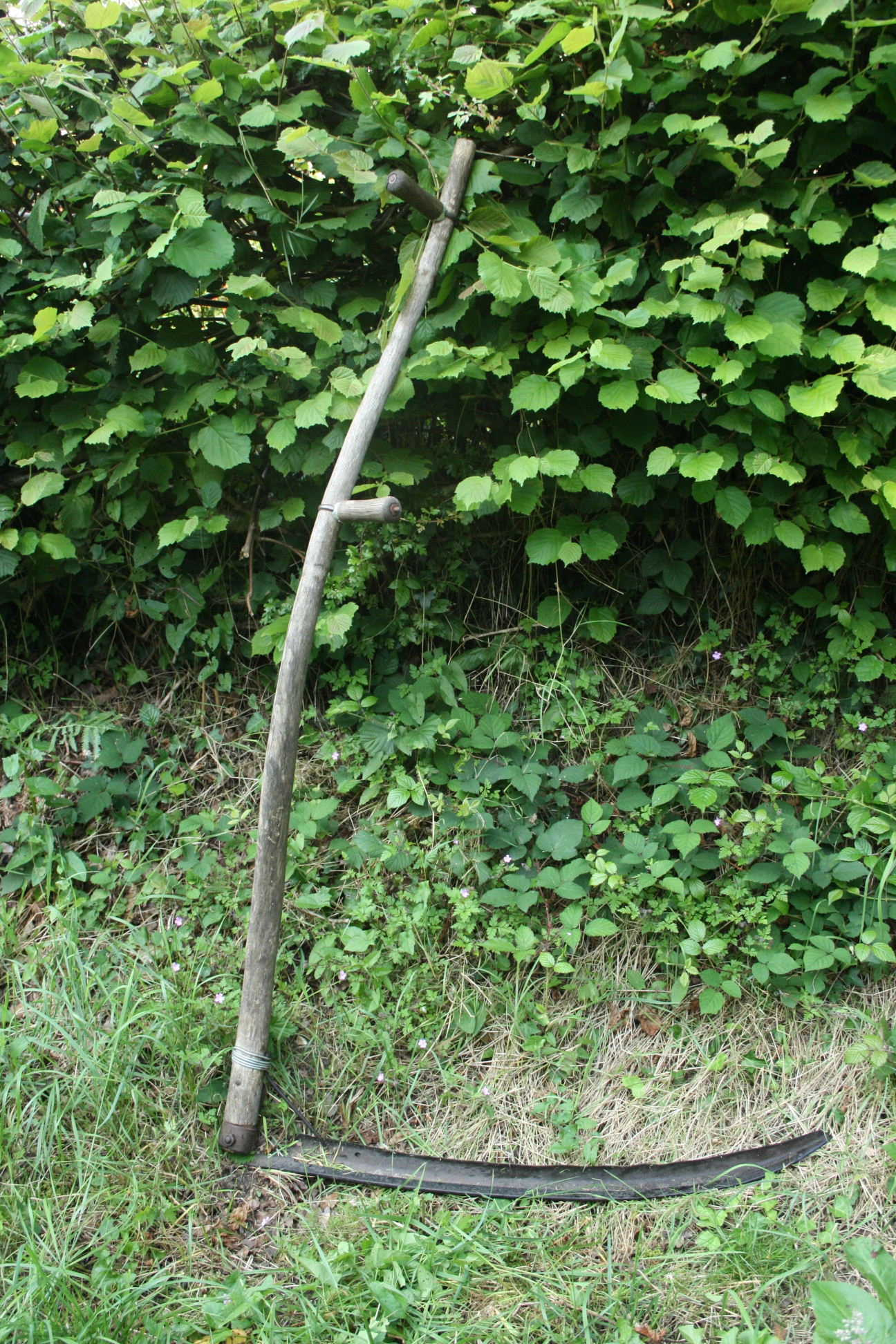
Swinging a blade, such as a scythe, above a sleeping dragon man, could prevent the ala with whom he fought from approaching his body and harming him.

There is a story about a dragon man from the village of Pečenjevce, eastern Serbia, who saw an ala in a cloud while he was scything. He said to scythemen beside him, "I am going to sleep, and you swing a scythe above me," before he lay down and fell asleep. A man who swung the scythe, however, inadvertently grazed him with the tip of the blade. When the dragon woke up, he told that he had been wounded by the ala he fought with, and lost a lot of blood. A dragon from the village of Bogojevac always kept with him a piece of a scythe blade or a knife. As soon as he perceived the imminent approach of bad weather, he would lie down on the ground and stick the blade above his head. It was thought that his spirit then soared into the clouds to deal with the ala. When he was drafted into the army, he fell asleep without a blade during a thunderstorm, and died. At a village near Tran in western Bulgaria, a man reputed to be a dragon would swoon when it started to thunder. After he came to, he would say, "How tired I am!" This was thought to refer to the strenuous battle he fought in the clouds.

In Banat and some areas of eastern Serbia, the dragon men were referred to as alovit. This adjective is derived from the noun ala, and means "having supernatural or demonic properties". It could be applied not only to humans, but also to dragons, snakes, horses, trees, armies, and rivers. An ala could be seen as a good creature in some regions, such as Banat, Mount Kopaonik in south Serbia, and the adjacent Župa basin with nearby areas, where she was believed to be connected to a territory, which she defended against attacks by the ale from other territories. This can be compared with the inter-regional fights of the zduhaći. In the villages that now form part of the city of Kruševac, when blessings were pronounced on Christmas Eve, the villagers would also say, "God, save our guardian ala." People interpreted hail ravaging their crops as a defeat of their ala by an ala from elsewhere. The victorious ala would loot the crop yield of the ravaged area, and transfer it to her own territory.

At the sight of hail clouds, the alovit man would fall into a trance-like sleep, before his soul issued from his body and flew up to the clouds. In the manner of an ala, his soul led the clouds over the fields of a neighbouring village. A man, who was thought to be alovit, was described as unusually tall, thin, and bony-faced, with a long beard and moustache. When the weather was good, he worked and behaved like the others in his village, but as soon as dark clouds covered the sky, he would close himself in his house, put blinds on the windows, and remain alone for as long as the bad weather lasted. People also talked that he suffered from epilepsy. In the region of Boljevac, the epileptics were said to be alovit—their souls went out of their bodies during epileptic fits and led hail clouds.

At the village of Kusić in Banat, a man named Ilija Bordan was regarded to be alovit; the villagers talked that he had a tail. Whenever a thunderstorm came, his appearance changed—he fought with an ala. If the ala was overwhelming him, Ilija would lie down and sleep, and if he was overpowering her, the clouds would start to dissipate. There was a tale in the same village about an alovit man who would warn the villagers of the approach of a thunderstorm, before he took a wagon pole on his back and flew into the clouds. At the village of Sokolovac in Banat, people told of an alovit man who had four nipples. At the sight of hail clouds, he would mount his mare and disappear for several days. The latter two men would come back tired, bruised, and with torn clothes. As held in the central Serbian region of Gruža, men could become dragonlike. As such, they would suddenly disappear during thunderstorms, and fly into the dark clouds to fight against ale. They were characterized as nimble, hot-tempered, rash and very strong. At a village near Radomir in western Bulgaria, there was a dragon man who was said to have been physically crippled by an ala.

The dragon man was believed to be born with some physical peculiarity, such as a caul, little wings or membranes beneath his armpits, a tail or teeth; or he was born an orphan. There were practices intended to preserve the supernatural power of the newborn dragon. In the region of Veles, Macedonia, twelve girls would pick cotton, spin yarn from it, weave a cloth from the yarn, made a shirt from the cloth, and finally dress the dragon boy in the shirt. As thought in the region of Leskovac, Serbia, such a boy would only then become able to defeat an ala, when three old women spun yarn, knitted a shirt, and dressed the child in it. All this had to be done in one day and one night, during which time the three women should not have spoken a single word. A similar custom was recorded in western Bulgaria, where it was also believed that the soul of the boy, while he slept in his cradle, left his body and walked around. If he was turned, he would die, as his soul could not return into his body.

According to a belief, the power of dragon boys was greatest at the time of their birth; the younger they were, the greater power they had. In a folk tale from eastern Serbia, a group of dragons surrounded an ala, which broke away and flew into a watermill. There was a woman in the mill with her baby, who was a dragon boy; he grabbed a stone and killed the ala with it. It was recorded in the region of Niš that a winged dragon boy, in his fights with ale, "takes a plough beam and immediately stops the ala, and hail ceases." The mother of a dragon boy wanted to make him an ordinary child by cutting off the winglets beneath his armpits, but that section resulted in the boy's death. As was thought in the Župa basin and nearby areas, no one but the mother should see a dragon boy during the first seventeen days of his life; otherwise the child would die. If he survived, he would protect his village from hail, and at the age of seven he would fly away from home. It was also believed in Župa that the dragon men lived alone, without contacts with other humans.

The prophet Elijah was also regarded as a protector from the ale. As soon as he spotted an ala consuming the fertility of fields, he would summon dragons and harness them to his flying chariot. They then together attacked the demon, shooting fiery arrows at her. Instead of the dragons, the prophet could summon dragon men. They would then fall asleep, and their souls would rush to the thundering clouds to assist the prophet against the ale. A legend in the region of Leskovac has it that fighting the ale was originated by Prophet Elijah, when he, accompanied by a dragon boy, killed twelve of these demons. In the popular tradition of Slavic peoples, Prophet Elijah is a Christian replacement of the pagan Slavic thunder god Perun.

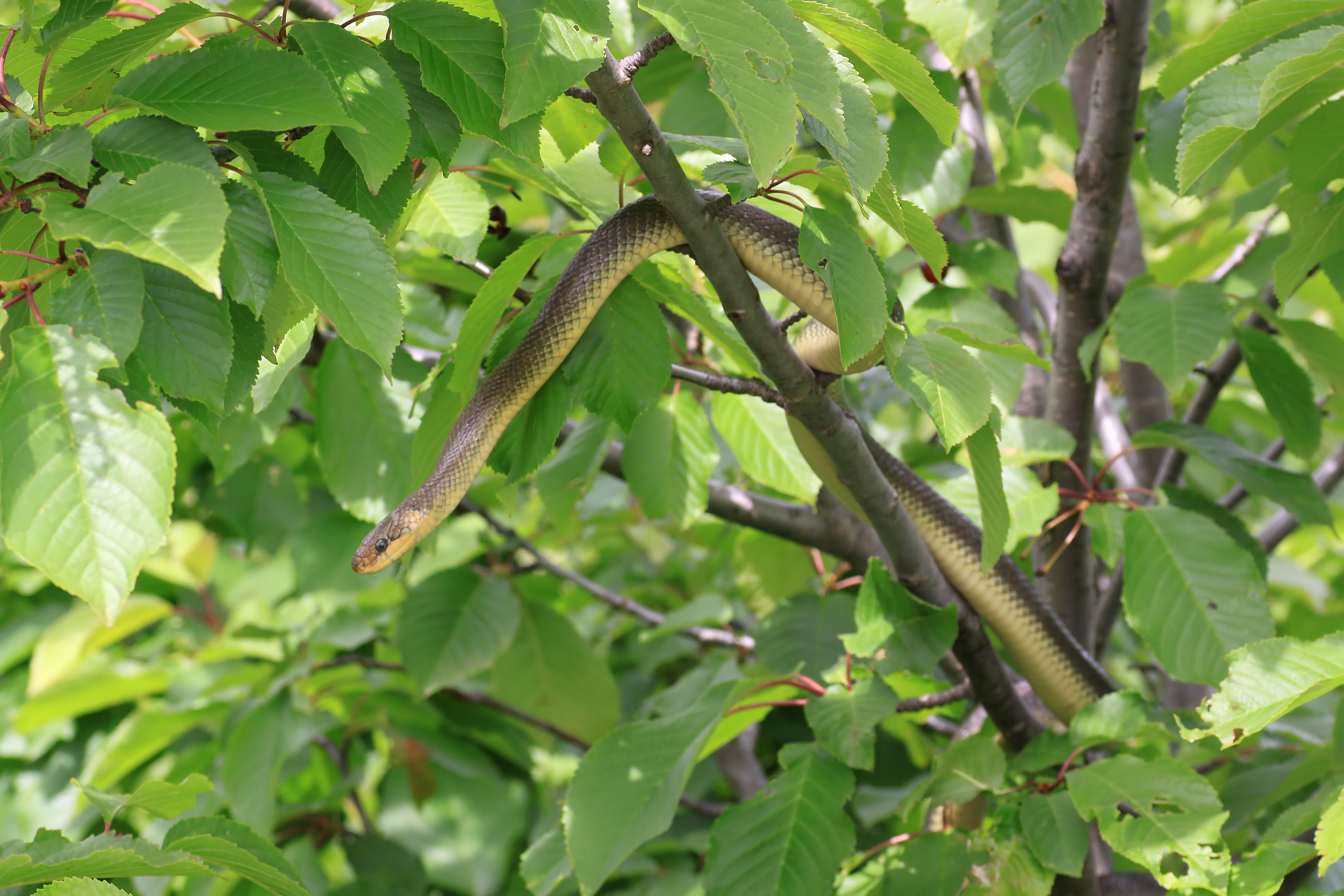
Aesculapian snakes defended the fields and vineyards they inhabited from hail. These snakes could become dragons if they attained a certain age.

Some animals could also be regarded as dragonlike, such as rams. It was said that a rooster, a gander, or a turkeycock could grow a pair of little wings beneath their natural wings, thus becoming powerful dragons. A dragon rooster dug a hole beneath the threshold of his owner's house. As soon as dark clouds appeared, the rooster would go into the hole, and his spirit would fly out from his body into the clouds to fight with ale. One day the owner killed the rooster, and immediately went mad. Another dragon rooster, with two combs, would fall to the ground and lie as if dead during thunderstorms. The Aesculapian snake (smuk in Serbian and smok in Bulgarian) was regarded as a very beneficial animal. People avoided disturbing it in any way. The Aesculapian snake which inhabited a crop field or a vineyard was seen as its guardian. The snake was said to fly into the hail clouds and drive them away from its field or yard, or it dispersed the clouds by raising its head high in the air and hissing as strong as it could. In the region of Niš, the Aesculapian snakes were said to help the dragon boy in his fights against ale. If an Aesculapian snake attained a certain age, it would grow wings and become a dragon.

The dragon was regarded as a great lover and seducer of beautiful women, whom he visited by night, entering their houses down the chimney before turning into a man. The women who were visited by a dragon would after a while grow weak, pale and sunken-faced. There were magical methods to repel the dragon from them. It was believed that the children born out of such liaisons were physically and mentally ill, and that they would not live long. In another belief, the dragon would come for his son amidst thunder and lightning, and fly away with him. In the region of Bitola, it was told that such children were born with a tail. After they grew wings, they flew into the sky, from where they shot witches with thunderbolts. There was a belief in the region of Leskovac that the dragon boys, fighters against ale born with the little wings, were offspring of dragons. At the village of Kruševo, Macedonia, people told of an old shepherd named Trail who was a son of a dragon. He was allegedly so strong that he could shatter cliffs, and when he shouted, his voice could be heard from miles away.

Old Slavic mythology knew of men who were born out of relationships between women and dragons. These men were endowed with prodigious strength and exceptional abilities. They could turn into a dragon and fly, which they usually did in crisis situations, like battles. Two such heroes are recorded in the Serbian epic poetry: Sekula Banović and Zmaj Ognjeni Vuk ("Fiery Dragon" Vuk). Both were late-medieval nobles and warriors, to whom mythical attributes were attached in the poetry. Their transformation into a dragon is described in three ways: the hero dresses his "dragon shirt"; he spreads his hidden wings; or he lets his soul out from his body in the form of a winged snake. The transformation may not be explicitly stated, but implied by a statement which indicates that the hero flies. Russian epic hero Volkh Vseslavevich is described as a son of a dragon; in folk poems, he transforms into a falcon, aurochs, wolf, and some other animals. In a couple of Serbian and Bulgarian folk poems, Saint Nicholas suddenly falls asleep, and while he sleeps, he saves ships from a storm.

In the popular tradition of Serbia, Bulgaria, and Macedonia, the ability to leave one's own body was also possessed by some cunning women who practised magic for healing. A widespread custom of these women was to yawn repeatedly during healing rituals. This indicated the egress of their soul, which entered the sick person's body to chase away disease-causing demonic entities. The rituals were accompanied by spells, in some of which the cunning women referred to their soul as a greyhound: "Run away, uroks, down gullies... The soul of Vida is a greyhound—she overtakes the uroks and chokes them." (An urok is a demonic entity, and Vida is the name of the cunning woman.)

== Related traditions ==
The idea about the men with the inborn ability to leave their bodies in a spirit form, has also been recorded in Slovene and Croat traditions. The spirit could turn into a bull, dog, boar, or some other animal. He intercepted bringers of bad weather, and fought with them to save the crops of his village. The men with this ability were designated by various names, such as vedomec in Tolmin, mogut in Turopolje, vremenjak in Lika and Sinj, legromant or nagromant in southern Dalmatia and the area around Dubrovnik, višćun in Dalmatia, and štrigun in Istria. A vedomec fought against another vedomec, a mogut against another mogut, and so on, and the winner would take bad weather to the region of his defeated foe. All these men were marked by some peculiarity connected with their birth. There were also supernatural beings, such as obilnjaks and brgants in Slovenia, and kombals in Međimurje, who clashed with each other during thunderstorms over the plenty of their territories.

A krsnik or kresnik was a man born with a caul, who could leave his body in spirit transformed into an animal. He fought demonic men called vukodlak (werewolves) and other evil agents. His victory meant that his village would have the abundance of all sorts of agricultural products. The krsnik was recorded in Istria, Gorski Kotar, the Kvarner Gulf, and parts of Slovenia. The benandanti were men born with a caul recorded in the region of Friuli in north-eastern Italy. They periodically fought for the fertility of the fields against male and female witches. The táltos, recorded in Hungary, were men and women born with teeth or some other physical peculiarity. They periodically fought each other in the shape of animals or flames. Their battles were often accompanied by storms. The winner would ensure abundant harvest for his village. The benandanti and the táltos were initiated at a certain age into their vocation by an older member of the same group, who visited them in a vision.

In Greek folklore, a stikhio (στοιχείο) was a spirit that protected his territory against the adverse stikhio spirits from other territories. In Albanian mythology, a drangue is a semi-human hero with enormous strength and the power to fly; he was born with a caul. The main goal of the drangue is to fight the demon kulshedra, a huge multi-headed fire-spitting dragon. He uses meteoric stones, lightning-swords, thunderbolts, piles of trees and rocks to defeat the kulshedra and to protect mankind from storms, fire, floods and other natural disasters caused by her destructive power. Heavy thunderstorms are thought to be the result of the battle. In Romanian folklore, there were no defenders against bad weather, which was produced by a gigantic flying serpentine creature called a balaur or a zmeu. A balaur could be controlled by an evil sorcerer called a şolomonar, who was able to ride on that demon. The notion of a şolomonar named a vîlva, who protected his village against attacks of vîlvas from other villages, was marginally encountered in some places of Romanian Banat.

It was believed in southern Poland that clouds and hail were produced by creatures named płanetnik, chmurnik, or obłocznik: they compressed fog into clouds, and fragmented ice with iron flails into hailstones. They were considered to be the spirits of infants who had died without baptism, or the spirits of drowned and hanged people. Such spirits were seen in Serbia as bringers of hail clouds; they were addressed in folk spells, with which they were made to lead the clouds away from the village. According to other notions, płanetniks were persons who flew into the sky during storms. They could fly in spirit, while they were in deep sleep, or they could fly in body and soul. The płanetniks were friendly toward humans, often warning them about the approach of a storm or hail. They could direct the movement of clouds.

Individuals who could leave their body in spirit during sleep were called burkudzäutä among the Ossetians of the Caucasus, and they were called mazzeri in parts of Corsica. The burkudzäutä, mounted on animals or household objects, flew on a night between Christmas and New Year to burku, the land of the dead described as a great meadow. There they collected the seeds of agricultural plants and took them to their village, thus ensuring a rich harvest. The dead pursued and shot arrows at them as they flew back home. The wounded burkudzäutä would fall sick after the return, and some of them would die. The mazzeri of neighbouring villages fought each other in spirit on the night between 31 July and 1 August. The village of the defeated mazzeri would suffer more deaths during the next year.

In the eastern Baltic region of Livonia, people designated as werewolves went underground in the shape of dogs to fight against sorcerers who stole the shoots of the grain. If the werewolves failed to wrest the shoots, there would be famine. In Romania, strigoi were people born with a caul, which they donned upon reaching adulthood; this made them invisible. They then travelled in animal form to the meadow at the end of the world. There they fought each other all night, becoming reconciled in the morning. The reason for the fight is not specified. The Circassians told that, on a certain night of the year, their sorcerers fought with the sorcerers of the Abkhaz people, trying to suck each other's blood.

In West Europe, medieval sources describe women who fell into trance on certain nights, abandoning their bodies in the form of an invisible spirit or animal. They then travelled to a gathering led by a female divinity who bestowed prosperity and knowledge. The divinity, semi-bestial or attended by animals, was known by various regional names, such as Holda, Perchta, Madonna Oriente, Richella, Bensozia, Dame Habonde, and Fairy Queen (in Scotland). She could be derived from Celtic goddesses like Epona, the Matres, and Artio. In Sicily, women and girls had nocturnal meetings in spirit with the so-called Donni di fuora "women from the outside", which could be traced back to the ancient ecstatic cult of the Mothers of Engyon, of Cretan origin.

The armier were men from Ariège in the Pyrenees who could see and talk to the souls of the dead. The mesultane were women and girls in Georgia who plunged into a lethargy and travelled in spirit to the land of the dead, to communicate with them.

== Theories on origin ==
The zduhaći, the dragon men, and the related folkloric figures of Europe can be compared with Eurasian shamans, e.g., the noaidi of the Sámi, as well as the shamans of the Samoyeds and Tungus in Siberia. They were all able to leave their body in spirit to fight against the enemies of their community. The shamans also fought against each other, usually in animal form, for reasons such as to procure for their side as much reindeer as possible. However, for a shaman's soul to leave his body, he had to work himself into a state of ecstasy through a ceremony consisting of drumming, dancing, chanting, and even taking narcotics. All the zduhaći had to do was to fall asleep, although the unusual depth of their sleep indicates a state of ecstasy. There are detailed and eventful descriptions of the journey of the shaman's soul, but no corresponding accounts exist in the case of the zduhaći. However, the zduhaći who left their bodies were said to have gone into the winds. This expression may contain an idea of a journey. Pavel Rovinsky recorded the words he heard from his landlady in Montenegro on a windy night in March: "Listen, how they sing—the travellers; they have gone high high! Happy journey to them!"

The crucial difference between the shamans and their European counterparts lies in the fact that the ecstasy of the former was public, while that of the latter was always private. Historian Carlo Ginzburg asserts that "[t]his divergence stands starkly against a homogeneous background." Ginzburg regards all of them as mediators with the realm of the dead, who are the "ambiguous dispensers of prosperity"; the ecstasy represents a temporary death. The accounts in which the figures fly or fight materially rather than in spirit, are attempts "to describe an ecstatic experience perceived as absolutely real". Ginzburg argues, adopting a diffusionist approach, that the shamanistic elements of the European folkloric figures have their original source in the shamanism of Siberian nomads, and their diffusion was possibly mediated by the Scythians. Another possibility is that the shamanistic beliefs are derived from a common source. Their nucleus could have developed in a remote past from cultural interactions between the Proto-Indo-Europeans, speakers of the Proto-Uralic language, and ancient populations of the Caucasus. A third possibility is derivation from structural characteristics of the human mind. This is suggested by the persistence of the shamanistic phenomena over a long period, and their dispersion over a large area in culturally disparate societies. These three possibilities are not mutually exclusive.

== In literature ==
In the novel Lelejska gora by Mihailo Lalić, set in Montenegro during the Second World War, there is a negative character, Kosto, nicknamed Zduvač (a local variant of zduhać.) Kosto is described as an elderly man of great strength. He says that when he lived in America the Italian Mafiosi called him Il Mago, "magician" or "sorcerer", which he translates as zduvač. His Colt revolver is called Zduvač's Spouter because it always hits its target. Kosto is killed by the main character of the novel in a brutal fight.

In a short story by Simo Matavulj, titled "Zduhač", Matavulj acts as the companion and translator for a French vicomte who goes to hunt bears near a mountainous village in Old Herzegovina (part of Montenegro). One of their escort is Mićun, a burly young man from the village, who falls into a trance during a storm. The vicomte is given the explanation that Mićun, being a zduhać, leaves his body to fight in the clouds against alien zduhaći. After an hour or two, the zduhać wakes up exhausted. Another man of the escort asks him, "Was it good for us?" to which Mićun answers affirmatively. The vicomte concludes the story by quoting Hamlet's well-known lines about the secret things of heaven and earth (Hamlet, 1.5.188–89).

== See also ==
- Gradobranitelj, man in Serbia who used magic to protect his village from bad weather
