= Ail =

Ail or AIL may refer to:

- Illness, a state of poor health
- Ail (Sailor Moon), a character in the Sailor Moon anime series
- Acceptance in lieu, an arrangement in the UK for accepting works of art etc. in lieu of tax
- Agilus, a Frankish abbot and saint
- Automotive Industries Ltd., a motor vehicle manufacturer of Israel
- American Income Life Insurance Company, a life insurance company in America
- Ail, a rare name for garlic (ail is French for garlic)
- All-Ireland League (rugby union)
- Aimele language, of Papua New Guinea (language code "ail")
- Artificial Intelligence Laboratory (disambiguation), various research institutes
- Accademia Italiana di Lingua, Italian language and culture association
- Army Institute of Law, an Indian law school
- Animation International Ltd.
- Miles Sound System, formerly known as Audio Interface Library, a sound software development kit for video games

== See also ==
- Ale (disambiguation)
- Aul
- Saint-Ail
- Yaman-Ail'
