= Artificial Intelligence Laboratory =

Artificial Intelligence Laboratory may refer to:

- Kiev Laboratory for Artificial Intelligence, a research institute in Kiev, Ukraine
- MIT Computer Science and Artificial Intelligence Laboratory, an interdisciplinary research entity at the Massachusetts Institute of Technology
- Stanford Artificial Intelligence Laboratory, the artificial intelligence research laboratory of Stanford University
- Category:Artificial intelligence laboratories
