= Christianization of saints and feasts =

Pre-Christian feast days adopted into the Christian calendar

The term Christianized calendar refers to feast days which are Christianized reformulations of feasts from pre-Christian times, such as Roman and Celtic traditions. Since many Christianized feasts honor specific saints, such as Saint Valentine and Saint Mark, these Christianized feasts also relate to the reformulation of deities from pre-Christian times into Christian saints.

== Christianization of saints ==
Historian Peter Brown, in his The Cult of the Saints: Its Rise and Function in Latin Christianity, argued that the ancient cults of pagan gods cannot be equated with the later cults of the saints. However, Caesarius of Arles and other churchmen deplored certain customs that from time to time seem to develop around the saints, such as the prolonged drinking of toasts, ostensibly in honor of the saint.

The historicity of some Christian saints has been treated skeptically by a number of academics, either because there is a lack of historical evidence for their origins, or due to similarities to pre-Christian deities and festivals. Some such local saints, especially those dating to when regions were being Christianized, have been removed from the Calendar of Saints and effectively desanctified by the Catholic Church after investigations led to doubts about their historicity. Others, such as Brigid of Kildare, have had doubts raised about their historicity, but retain their position in part due to their historical importance.

The legend of Barlaam and Josaphat was derived, via Arabic and Georgian versions, from the life story of Siddartha Gautama, known as the Buddha. The king-turned-monk Joasaphat (Arabic: Yūdhasaf or Būdhasaf; Georgian: Iodasaph) also gets his name from the Sanskrit Bodhisattva, the term traditionally used to refer to Gautama before his awakening. Barlaam and Ioasaph were placed in the Orthodox calendar of saints on 26 August, and in the Roman martyrology, they were canonized (as "Barlaam and Josaphat") and assigned 27 November. The story was translated into Hebrew in the Middle Ages as Ben-HaMelekh ve HaNazir ("The King's Son and the Nazirite"). Thus the Buddhist story was turned into a Christian and Jewish legend.

== Christianization of feasts ==
=== St. Valentine's Day ===
Saint Valentine's Day on 14 February, commemorates three separate martyrs named Valentinus. One is described as a priest at Rome, and another as bishop of Interamna (modern Terni). Both apparently died sometime in the second half of the third century and were buried at different locations on the Flaminian Way. The connection of the saints' feast day with popular romantic customs arose in the Middle Ages, when it was commonly believed that half way through the second month of the year, the birds began to pair.

Alfred Kellogg and Robert Cox have claimed that the modern customs of Saint Valentine's Day originate from the Roman Lupercalia customs. However, J. Hillis Miller and others find the hypothesis unconvincing: they say there is no proof that the modern customs of Saint Valentine's Day can be traced to the Lupercalia, and the claim seems to originate from misconceptions about the festivities. Jack Oruch says there is no written record of Pope Gelasius I ever intending a replacement of Lupercalia.

=== Easter ===
Christians generally regard Easter as the most important festival of the ecclesiastical calendar. It is also the oldest feast of Christianity and connected to the Jewish holiday Passover. Many terms relating to Easter, such as paschal are derived from the Hebrew term for passover. In many non-English speaking countries, the feast is called by some derivation of "pasch". The English term, according to the Venerable Bede, is an Anglo-Saxon form relating to Ēostre, a Teutonic goddess of the rising light of day and spring.

=== St. Mark's Day ===
According to hagiographic scholar Hippolyte Delehaye, the Greater Litanies of the Feast of St. Mark (April 25) are a continuation and adaptation of the Roman agricultural festival, Robigalia.

=== Walpurgis Night ===
Walpurgis Night is the eve of the Christian feast day of Saint Walpurga or Walburga, celebrated on the night of 30 April and into 1 May. In Germany, the Netherlands, Czechia, and Sweden, bonfires are lit on Walpurgis Night. The date coincided with an older May Eve festival, which was also celebrated in much of northern Europe with the lighting of bonfires at night.

A variety of festivals of pre-Christian origin had been celebrated at this time (halfway between the spring equinox and summer solstice) to mark the beginning of summer, including Beltane in Ireland and Britain. Folklorist Jack Santino says, "Her day and its traditions almost certainly are traceable to pre-Christian celebrations that took place at this time, on the first of May". Art historian Pamela Berger noted Walpurga's association with sheaves of grain and suggested that her cult was adapted from pagan agrarian goddesses.

=== St John's Day ===
The summer solstice has been observed since the Neolithic era, with many ancient monuments in Europe aligned with sunrise or sunset on the solstice. In the ancient Roman world, 24 June was the traditional date of the summer solstice and 25 December the date of the winter solstice, both of which were marked by festivals.

In the 4th century AD, the Christian church began marking 24 June as the birth day of Saint John the Baptist and 25 December as the birth day of Jesus. Within Christian theology, John the Baptist "was understood to be preparing the way for Jesus", with John 3:30 stating "He must increase, but I must decrease"; this is symbolized in the fact that the sun's height in the sky and length of the day begins to decrease after the summer solstice and begins to increase after the winter solstice. According to Éamonn Ó Carragáin, "This solar cycle was completed by balancing Christ's conception and birth against the conception and birth of his cousin, John the Baptist". Saint John's Eve (23 June) is intertwined with European Midsummer celebrations and both are marked by lighting bonfires.

=== All Hallows ===
"Hallowtide" refers to the three days of Halloween, All Saints' Day, and All Souls' Day that are traditionally observed in Western Christianity from October 31 through November 2 as a commemoration of the dead.

In many early cultures, the day was considered to start at dusk. Similarly, in Celtic countries, the year was considered to begin in winter at Samhain, and it was thought that the start of the year was a time when the world of the dead met that of the living; rather than a sinister event, this was considered a time when a feast should be laid out for the supposed temporary visit from the souls of the dead.

The Orthodox tradition deals rather with the zealous prayer for the dead, whom they believe are allowed to visit the living during 40 days after the moment of death and are greatly comforted and even saved from hell through these prayers. In some Catholic traditions, the night is one when the graves of dead relatives are visited, with candles being lit, under a familiarly atmosphere, often including picnic; many historians argue that this is clearly derived from the pre-Christian events. The Christian festival was originally held annually on the week after Pentecost and is still held at about this date by the Orthodox churches, but in western Europe, churches began to hold it at the same time as the pre-Christian festivals commemorating the dead, and it was eventually moved officially by Pope Gregory III.

The process was repeated in Southern Mexico, where the Aztec feast of Mictēcacihuātl in early August was syncretized into the Day of the Dead.

=== Christmas ===
The earliest evidence of the birth of Jesus Christ being marked on December 25 is a sentence in the Chronograph of 354. Liturgical historians generally agree that this part of the text was written in Rome in AD 336.

A widely held theory is that the Church chose December 25 as Christ's birthday (Dies Natalis Christi) to appropriate the Roman winter solstice festival Dies Natalis Solis Invicti (birthday of Sol Invictus, the 'Invincible Sun'), held on the same date. This festival had been instituted by the emperor Aurelian in AD 274. Gary Forsythe, Professor of Ancient History, says "This celebration would have formed a welcome addition to the seven-day period of the Saturnalia (December 17–23), Rome's most joyous holiday season since Republican times, characterized by parties, banquets, and exchanges of gifts".

The early Church linked Jesus Christ to the Sun and referred to him as the 'Sun of Righteousness' (Sol Justitiae) prophesied by Malachi. A Christian treatise attributed to John Chrysostom and dating to the early fourth century AD associates Christ's birth with the birthday of Sol:

"Our Lord, too, is born in the month of December ... the eighth before the calends of January [25 December] ... But they [the pagans] call it the 'Birthday of the Unconquered'. Who indeed is so unconquered as Our Lord? Or, if they say that it is the birthday of the Sun, [we may say] He is the Sun of Justice".

A late fourth-century sermon by Saint Augustine explains why the winter solstice was a fitting day to celebrate Christ's birth:

"Hence it is that He was born on the day which is the shortest in our earthly reckoning and from which subsequent days begin to increase in length. He, therefore, who bent low and lifted us up chose the shortest day, yet the one whence light begins to increase".

Another theory suggests that Christmas was calculated as nine months after a date chosen as Christ's conception (the Annunciation): March 25, the Roman date of the spring equinox. This theory was first proposed by French writer Louis Duchesne in 1889.

== See also ==
- Allhallowtide
- Christianized sites
