= ING Unsung Heroes =

ING Unsung Heroes is a grant program for Kindergarten through 12th grade educators in the United States. The program is run by the U.S. Financial Services division of global financial services company ING Group (ING). The program awards funding to K-12 educators for innovative classroom projects they currently operate, as well as projects they would like to implement.

== Program overview ==
Each year, 100 educators are selected from a pool of applicants to receive awards of $2,000 each. Three of those finalists are chosen to receive additional funding. First place receives an additional $25,000. Second place receives an additional $10,000. Third place receives an additional $5,000. All awards must be used to further the projects within the school or school system. Checks are made payable jointly to the recipient and his/her school. At least one award will be granted in each of the 50 United States, provided one or more qualified applications are received from each state.

In the application, applicants must provide a thorough description of the project, demonstrate how the program directly benefits students (as well as the school overall, parents, and the community), and put together a budget showing how they would spend the $2,000 grant as well as the potential additional funding.

The postmark deadline for applications each year is April 30. The application form is available in PDF format on the program's website.

== Eligibility ==
Applicants for ING Unsung Heroes must be employed by an accredited K-12 public or private school in the U.S. Specifically, applicants must be full-time educators, teachers, principals, paraprofessionals, or classified staff with effective projects that improve student learning.

Awards are granted without regard to race, color, creed, religion, age, gender, disability, or national origin. Previous recipients are not eligible to apply for another award.

== Selection of Recipients ==
To ensure impartiality, applications are submitted to, and evaluated by, Scholarship America. Following the selection of finalists, the top three award recipients are chosen from that group by ING’s Educators Advisory Board. The Educators Advisory Board is composed of six educators and education administrators from various areas of the United States. Educators on the board include past state Teachers of the Year.

== History ==
The program, originally called the Education’s Unsung Heroes Awards Program, started in 1995 with the first awards handed out in 1996. During that first year, 80 finalists were selected for awards totaling $200,000. In 1998, the number of awards was increased to 100.

In January 2004, the program was renamed ING Unsung Heroes. The name became a registered service mark in March 2006. In 2005, ING Unsung Heroes celebrated the 10th anniversary of the program's inception by awarding a special "Best in Class" $10,000 grant to the 2003 First Place Winner, Jennifer Wise of Tampa, FL. The award recognized Ms. Wise as the most notable of the program's top prize winners. Her "Kids and Canines" program matches at-risk middle school students with puppies to train as service dogs for the physically disabled in their community.

In 2007, the program awarded its top prize totaling $27,000 to an elementary school teacher in Los Angeles, CA.

In 2008, the top grant was awarded to a teacher from Los Alamitos, CA.

== Recognition ==
The ING Unsung Heroes program has been recognized as one of the major private corporate grant programs in the U.S. for K-12 teachers by Educators Week, Disney, The Foundation Center, and others.

== See also ==
- ING Group
- ING Direct
- Scholarship America
