= Joe Ing =

English footballer

Personal information
- Full name: Joseph Henry Charles Ing
- Date of birth: 16 October 1890
- Place of birth: Walthamstow, England
- Date of death: 1977 (aged 86–87)
- Position: Right half

Senior career*
Years	Team	Apps	(Gls)
–1907	Clapton Warwick		
1916–1920	Clapton Orient	17	(0)
- Northfleet
- Swindon Town
- * Club domestic league appearances and goals

Joseph Henry Charles Ing (16 October 1890 – 1977) was an English professional footballer who played in the Football League for Clapton Orient as a right half.

== Personal life ==
Ing served in the Royal Navy during the First World War.

== Career statistics ==
Appearances and goals by club, season and competition
Club	Season	League			FA Cup		Total	
Club	Season	Division	Apps	Goals	Apps	Goals	Apps	Goals
Clapton Orient	1919–20	Second Division	17	0	1	0	18	0
Career total			17	0	1	0	18	0
