= Ings (disambiguation) =

Ings are water meadows.

Ings also may refer to:

- Ings, Cumbria, UK village

== Surname ==
- Christian Ings (born 1999), American basketball player
- Daniel Ings (born 1985), English actor
- Danny Ings (born 1992), English footballer
- Kendrick Ings (born 1990), American football player
- Simon Ings (born 1965), English writer
- Welby Ings (born 1956), New Zealand film director and academic

== See also ==
- Ing (disambiguation)
