= NASU Institute of Plant Physiology and Genetics =

Soviet-Ukrainian research institute

Institute of Plant Physiology and Genetics
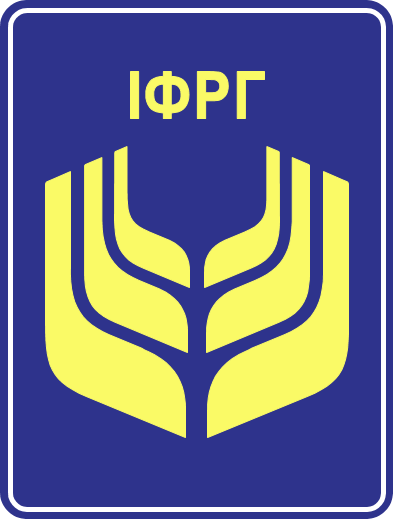
- Founded: 1946
- Founder: P.A. Vlasiuk
- Type: Research institute
- Purpose: Genetics, plant breeding, physiology
- Location: Kyiv, Ukraine
- Region served: World wide
- Product: New technologies, crop seeds, fertilizers
- Method: Research, education
- Members: about 300
- Owner: Government
- Key people: Director General Dr. Volodymyr V. Morgun
- Employees: about 1,000
- Volunteers: about 100
- Website: www.ifrg.kiev.ua

The Institute of Plant Physiology and Genetics of the National Academy of Sciences of Ukraine (Ukrainian: Інститут фізіології рослин і генетики НАН України, romanized: Instytut fiziolohii roslyn i henetyky NAN Ukrainy, IPPG) is a leading scientific research organisation in the Ukrainian city of Kyiv. Founded in 1946 as a branch of the Institute of Botany, the Institute specialises in crop breeding, plant physiology, genetics and cellular engineering.

== Current status ==
As of 2007, the Institute had 7 departments, 3 regional science centers with about 1,000 employees.

== Main scientific fields ==
Scientific research of the Institute are executed after perspective directions, NAN of Ukraine ratified Presidium

- finding out of physical, chemical, molecular conformities that law the growth, development and firmness of the vegetable systems, creation on this basis of new technologies, and biotechnology;
- comprehensive study of processes of photosynthesis, mineral feed of plants, biological azotfiksacii, possibilities of the use biologically of active matters, ground of new intensive technologies of growing and storage of agricultural produce;
- study of mechanisms of genetic processes with the purpose of development of principles of management of living organisms the inherited changeability, development of genetic and physiology bases of selection of plants.

== Scientific schools ==
The institute comprises scientific schools in the following disciplines:

- molecular genetics (founder is an academician of NAN, Ukraine, Serhij Mykhajlo Gershenzon);
- experimental plant mutagenetics (founder is an academician of NAN, Ukraine, Volodymyr Vasyl Morgun);
- physiology of plant growth and development (founder is Ukrainian Honoured Scientist F.L. Kalinin);
- physiological role of trace elements (founder is an academician of AN, Ukraine, Vasgnil p. A. Vlasyuk);
- physiology and ecology of photosynthesis (founder is Ukrainian Honoured Scientist A. S. Okanenko).

== Achievement and developments ==
The institute has contributed to the revision and introduction of sorts and hybrids of winter wheat, rye, triticale, and corn. Researchers have also developed a new high-efficiency, competitive cultures of nodule Rhizobium bacteria.

== Management ==
- Director: Volodymyr V. Morgun, DSc (Biol)
