= Ing =

Ing, ing, or ING may refer to:

== Art and media ==
- ...ing, a 2003 Korean film
- i.n.g, a Taiwanese girl group
- The Ing, a race of dark creatures in the 2004 video game Metroid Prime 2: Echoes
- "Ing", the first song on The Roches' 1992 album A Dove

== In old Germanic history ==
- Ing, form of the Germanic god name Yngvi
- Ingwaz rune, also known as Ing in Old English, a runic symbol possibly referring to Yngvi

== Go game ==
- Ing Cup, an international Go tournament sponsored by the Ing Foundation (founded by Ing Chang-ki)
- Ing Prize, an incentive for research in computer Go
- Ing rules, a ruleset of Go

== People ==
- Ing (surname), a medieval English surname, of Norse-Viking origins
- Ing Chang-ki (1914–1997), Taiwanese industrialist, philanthropist and founder of the Ing Foundation
- Ing Yoe Tan (born 1948), Dutch lawmaker of Chinese descent, member of the Senate for the Labour Party (PvdA) since 1998

== Other uses ==
- ING Group, a Dutch multinational banking and financial services corporation
- Ing., an abbreviation for the Engineer's degree awarded in many countries by technical universities or polytechnics
- ING, Inactive National Guard of the U.S. Army
- Index Nominum Genericorum, an index of all published generic names of plants covered by the International Code of Botanical Nomenclature
- Ing River, a tributary of the Mekong
- ING Unsung Heroes, a grant program for Kindergarten through 12th grade educators in the United States
- Instituut voor Nederlandse Geschiedenis, Institute of Dutch History
- Isaac Newton Group of Telescopes, in La Palma, Canary Islands
- Deg Xinag language, an ISO 639-3 code

== See also ==
- -ing, an English suffix
- Ings (disambiguation)
