= Eileen (disambiguation) =

Eileen is a given name.

Eileen may also refer to:

- Eileen (musical), 1917
- Eileen (novel), a 2015 novel by Ottessa Moshfegh
- Eileen (film), a 2023 film based upon the novel by Ottessa Moshfegh
- Eileen, Wisconsin, United States

== See also ==
- "Come On Eileen", a 1982 song by Dexys Midnight Runners
- Aileen, a given name
- Aylin, a given name
- Helen (disambiguation)
- Ilene, a given name
