= Kyiv Laboratory for Artificial Intelligence =

Research institute in Kyiv, Ukraine

The Kyiv Laboratory for Artificial Intelligence (NeuroTechnica) is a research institute in Kyiv, the capital of Ukraine.

== Research ==
- Speech recognition,
- Speech synthesis,
- Prototype of the system to understand text in a natural language,
- Recognition of the hand-written information,
- Optical character recognition,
- System of the automatic construction of
- Spellcheckers for arbitrary linear languages,
- Translation systems with elements of the semantic analysis,
- Translation memory,
- Vocabularies,
- Systems of training to languages,
- Web robots,
- and others.

== Current project "Veliar-3" ==
- the system to understand text in a natural language,
- program-instrumental system of automatisation of programming

("PICAP"):

  - language support Cprolog,
  - construct logics support Veliar-2,
  - filemanager Fmgr,
  - text editor Fedit,
  - language support Perl-6,
  - language support Lisp-13,
  - language support Common-Lisp,
  - language support CLIPS,
  - primary key hierarchy database support BTIO,
  - database support BerkeleyDB,
  - connection support with С-compilers.

== Previous projects ==
- "Veliar-2" - further development of the basis project,
- "Veliar" - programming language, for developing systems of "Artificial Intelligence" class,
- "Gebe Deutschunterricht" (Teaching German) - multimedia system,
- Cossack "3D speaking head" (Cossack - multimedia program with mimics for speech synthesis)
