= List of legendary creatures (S) =

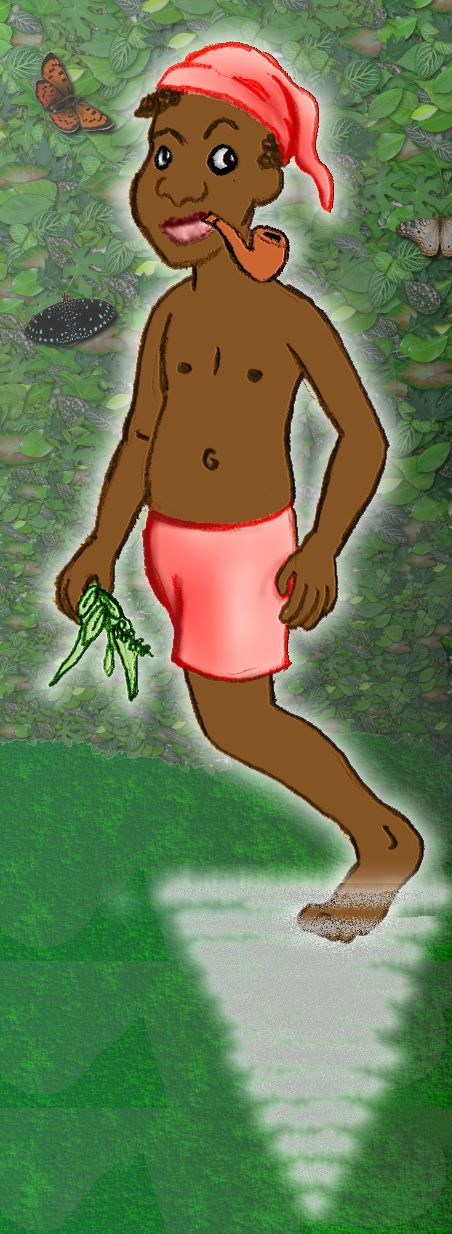
Saci Pererê

1. Saci (Brazilian) – One-legged nature spirit
2. Sack Man (Worldwide)
3. Sagari (Japanese) – Horse head that dangles from trees on Kyūshū
4. Sakabashira (Japanese) – Haunted pillar, installed upside-down
5. Salamander (Alchemy) – Fire elemental
6. Samebito (Japanese) – Shark-man servant of the dragon king of the sea
7. Samodiva (Slavic) – Nature spirit
8. Sampati (Hindu) – The demigod Jatayu's brother
9. Sandman (Northern Europe) – Nursery spirit that induces sleep in children
10. Sango (South Western Nigeria) – Yoruba king of arts, music, dance and entertainment
11. Santelmo (Philippine) – Spirits in the form of fireballs that roam around the forest
12. Santa Claus (North Pole-European folklore) – Elderly man who delivers gifts to well-behaved children on the night of Christmas Eve
13. Sânziană (Romanian) – Nature spirit
14. Sarimanok (Philippine) – Bird of good fortune
15. Sarngika (Hindu) – Bird spirit
16. Sarugami (Japanese) – Wicked monkey spirit who was defeated by a dog
17. Satori (Japanese) – Mind-reading humanoid
18. Satan (Heaven-Abrahamic mythology) – Ruler of Hell
19. Satyr (Greek) – Human-goat hybrid and fertility spirit
20. Satyrus (Medieval Bestiary) – Apes who always bear twins, one the mother loves, the other it hates
21. Sayona (Venezuela) – Vengeful spirit
22. Sazae-oni (Japanese) – Shapeshifting turban snail spirit
23. Sceadugenga (English) – Shapeshifting undead
24. Scitalis (Medieval Bestiaries) – Snake which mesmerizes its prey
25. Scorpion Man (Sumerian) – Human-scorpion hybrid
26. Schrat (German and Slavic) – Either a wood sprite, domestic sprite and/or a nightmare demon
27. Scylla (Greek) – Human-snake hybrid with a snake's tail, twelve legs, and six long-necked snake heads
28. Sea-lion
29. Sea monk (Medieval folklore) – Fish-like humanoid
30. Sea monster (Worldwide) – Giant, marine animals
31. Sea serpent (Worldwide) – Serpentine sea monster
32. Sea-Wyvern (Heraldic) – Fish-tailed wyvern
33. Seko (Japanese) – Water spirit which can be heard making merry at night
34. Selkie (Faroese, Icelandic, Irish, and Scottish) – Human-seal shapeshifter
35. Senbiki Okami – Wolf spirits
36. Senpoku-Kanpoku (Japanese) – Human-faced frog which guides newly deceased souls to the graveyard
37. Seps (Medieval Bestiaries) – Snake with corrosive venom
38. Serpent (Worldwide) – Snake spirit
39. Serpopard (Ancient Egypt) – Serpent-leopard hybrid
40. Seven Whistlers (English folklore) – Group of seven birds who's call foretells misfortune
41. Shachihoko (Japanese) – Tiger-carp hybrid
42. Shade (Worldwide) – Spiritual imprint
43. Shadow People (American) – Malevolent ghost
44. Shahbaz (Persian) – Giant eagle or hawk
45. Shaitan (Islam) – Islamic version of the Devil (Satan) from the Bible
46. Shang-Yang (Chinese) – Rain bird
47. Shapeshifter
48. Shedim (Jewish) – Chicken-legged demon
49. Shedu (Akkadian and Sumerian) – Protective spirit who takes the form of a winged bull or human-headed lion
50. Shellycoat (English, Scottish and German, as schellenrocc) – Water spirit
51. Shen (Chinese) – Shapeshifing sea monster
52. Shenlong (Chinese) – Weather dragon
53. Shibaten (Japanese) – Water spirit from Shikoku
54. Shikigami (Japanese) – Servant spirit
55. Shiki-ōji (Japanese) – Child-sized servant spirit
56. Shikome (Japanese) – Underworld hag
57. Shinigami (Japanese) – "Death god"
58. Shiro-bōzu (Japanese) – White, faceless spirit
59. Shirouneri (Japanese) – Animated mosquito netting or dust cloth
60. Shiryō (Japanese) – Spirit of a dead person
61. Shisa (Japanese) – Lion-dog hybrid
62. Shishi (Chinese) – Protective animal
63. Shōjō (Japanese) – Red-haired sea-sprites who love alcohol
64. Shōkera (Japanese) – Creature that peers in through skylights
65. Shtojzovalle (Albanian) – Small woodland creatures of extraordinary beauty
66. Shtriga (Albanian) – Vampire witch that feeds on children
67. Shui Gui (Chinese) – Drowned ghost
68. Shug Monkey (English) – Dog/monkey
69. Shunoban (Japanese) – Red-faced ghoul
70. Shuten-dōji (Japanese) – Ruler of the Oni
71. Sídhe – (Irish and Scottish) – Ancestral or nature spirit
72. Sigbin (Philippine) – Goat-like vampire
73. Sihuanaba
74. Sileni (Greek) – Bald, fat, thick-lipped, and flat-nosed followers of Dionysus
75. Simargl (Slavic) – Winged dog
76. Simurgh (Persian) – Dog-lion-peacock hybrid
77. Singa (Batak) – Feline animal
78. Sint Holo (Choctaw) – Serpentine rain spirit
79. Siren (Greek) – Human-bird hybrid
80. Sirin (Slavic) – Demonic human-headed bird
81. Sirrush (Akkadian) – Dragon with aquiline hind legs and feline forelegs
82. Sisiutl (American Indian) – Two-headed sea serpent
83. Si-Te-Cah (Paiute) – Red-haired giants
84. Sjörå (Norse) – Freshwater spirit
85. Šišiga
86. Sjövættir (Norse) – Sea spirit
87. Skin-walker (American Indian) – Animal-human shapeshifter
88. Skogsrå (Scandinavian) – Forest spirit
89. Sköll (Norse) – Wolf that chases the Sun
90. Skookum (Chinook Jargon) – Hairy giant
91. Skeleton (Medieval folklore) – Living skeletons
92. Skrzak (Slavic) – Household spirit
93. Sky Women (Polish) – Weather spirit
94. Slavic dragon
95. Sleipnir (Norse) – Eight-legged horse
96. Sluagh (Irish and Scottish) – Restless ghost
97. Snow Lion (Tibetan) – Celestial animal
98. Sodehiki-kozō (Japanese) – Invisible spirit which pulls on sleeves
99. Sōgenbi (Japanese) – Fiery ghost of an oil-stealing monk
100. Soragami (Japanese) – Ritual disciplinary demon
101. Soraki-gaeshi (Japanese) – Sound of trees being cut down, when later none seem to have been cut
102. Sorobanbōzu (Japanese) – Ghost with an abacus
103. Sōtangitsune (Japanese) – Fox spirit from Kyoto
104. Soucouyant (Trinidad and Tobago) – Vampiric hag who takes the form of a fireball at night
105. Spearfinger (Cherokee) – Sharp-fingered hag
106. Spectre (Worldwide) – Terrifying ghost
107. Sphinx (Egyptian and Greek) – Winged woman-headed lion
108. Spiriduş (Romanian) – Little people
109. Spriggan (Cornish) – Guardians of graveyards and ruins
110. Sprite (Medieval folklore) – little people, ghosts or elves
111. Squonk (American) – Ugly and lonely creature capable of evading capture by dissolving itself into a pool of tears
112. Stallo (Sámi) – Cannibalistic giant
113. Stihi (Albanian) – Demonic dragon who guards a treasure
114. Strigoi (Romanian) – Vampire
115. Strix (Roman) – Vampiric bird
116. Struthopodes (Medieval Bestiaries) – Humanoid whose males have enormous feet, and females have tiny feet
117. Strzyga (Slavic) – Vampiric undead
118. Stuhać (Slavic) – Malevolent mountain spirit
119. Stymphalian Bird (Greek) – Metallic bird
120. Suangi (New Guinea) – Cannibalistic sorcerer
121. Succubus (Judeo-Christian) – Female night-demon and seductress
122. Sudice (Slavic) – Fortune spirit
123. Sunakake-baba (Japanese) – Sand-throwing hag
124. Sundel Bolong (Indonesian mythology) – ghost of a woman with beautiful long black hair and a long white dress known for a large hole on its back.
125. Sunekosuri (Japanese) – Small dog- or cat-like creature that rubs against a person's legs at night
126. Sun Wukong
127. Şüräle (Turkic) – Forest spirit
128. Surma (Finnish) – Hellhound
129. Suzaku (Japanese) – Japanese version of the Chinese Vermillion Bird
130. Svaðilfari (Norse) – Unnatural strong horse, father of Sleipnir
131. Svartálfar (Norse) – Cavern spirits; the Black Elves
132. The Swallower (Ancient Egyptian) – Crocodile-leopard-hippopotamus hybrid
133. Swan maiden (Worldwide) – Swan-human shapeshifter
134. Sylph (Alchemy) – Air elemental
135. Sylvan (Medieval folklore) – Forest spirit
136. Syrbotae (Medieval Bestiaries) – African giant
137. Syrictæ (Medieval Bestiaries) – Reptilian humanoid
