= List of Romanian fairy tales =

Fairy tales are stories that range from those originating in folklore to more modern stories defined as literary fairy tales.

This is a list of Romanian fairy tales:

== Collections ==
- Basmele românilor (Basmele românilor. O colecție nemuritoare) is a series of volumes of Romanian fairy tales collected by 19th-century Romanian folklorists, published in 2010.
  - Volumul I - Petre Ispirescu
  - Volumul II – Dumitru Stăncescu
  - Volumul III - Ion Pop Reteganul
  - Volumul IV – Alexandru Vasiliu, I.C. Fundescu
  - Volumul V – N. D. Popescu-Popnedea, Mihai Eminescu
  - Volumul VI – Simion Florea Marian
  - Volumul VII - Ion G. Sbiera
  - Volumul VIII - Ioan Slavici, G. Dem. Teodorescu
  - Volumul IX - Tudor Pamfile, Constantin Rădulescu-Codin
  - Volumul X - Petre Ispirescu
- Legende sau basmele românilor ("Romanian Legends or Fairy-tales"), a collection, in several volumes, of Romanian folktales, first published in 1872 by Petre Ispirescu.

== B ==
- "Balaurul fermecat" ("Enchanted Balaur")

== C ==
- "Capra cu trei iezi", by Ion Creangă
- "Cele trei rodii aurite" ("The Three Golden Pomegranates"), by Petre Ispirescu

== D ==
- "Doi feți cu stea în frunte" ("The Boys with the Golden Stars"), by Ioan Slavici
- "Dănilă Prepeleac" de Ion Creangă

== F ==
- "Fata babei și fata moșneagului" by Ion Creangă
- "Fata din dafin" ("The Bay-Tree Maiden")
- "Făt-Frumos cel rătăcit", by Petre Ispirescu
- "Făt-Frumos cu părul de aur" ("Făt-Frumos with the Golden Hair" or "The Foundling Prince") by Petre Ispirescu
- "Făt-Frumos din lacrimă" by Mihai Eminescu

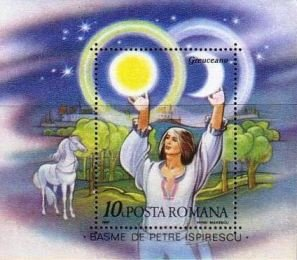
Greuceanu

== G ==
- "Greuceanu"

== H ==
- "Povestea lui Harap Alb" by Ion Creangă

== I ==
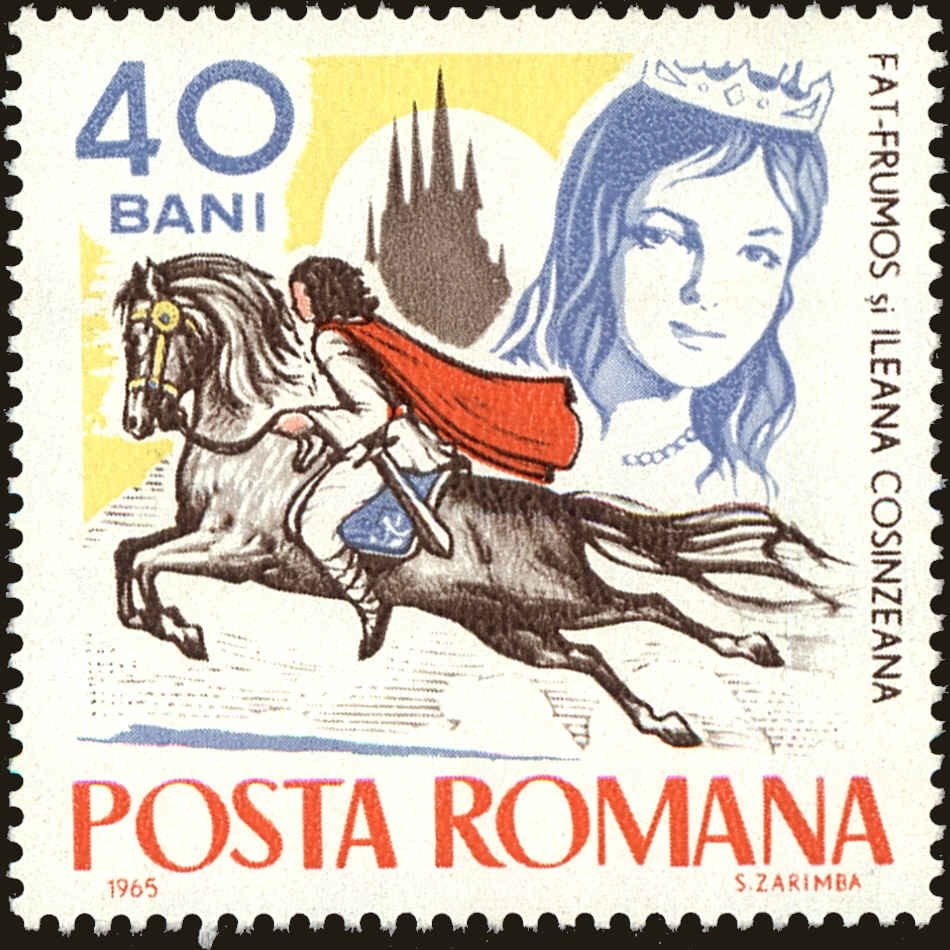
Făt-Frumos and Ileana Cosânzeana

- "Ileana Simziana" by Petre Ispirescu
- Ileana Cosânzeana
- "Ivan Turbincă" ("The Story of Ivan Turbincă"), by Ion Creangă

== Î ==
- "Înșir-te mărgărite" ("A String of Pearls Twined with Golden Flowers")

== O ==
- "Omul de piatră" ("The Man of Stone")

== P ==
- "Pasărea măiastră" ("The Wonderful Bird") by Petre Ispirescu
- "Porcul cel fermecat" ("The Enchanted Pig")
- "Povestea cu măr moramăr și păsărica a ciută" (1972)
- "Povestea lui Harap-Alb" by Ion Creangă
- "Povestea porcului" ("Story of the Pig") by Ion Creangă
- "Prâslea cel voinic și merele de aur" ("Prâslea the Brave and the Golden Apples")
- "Punguța cu doi bani" by Ion Creangă

== S ==
- "Sarea în bucate"
- Stan Bolovan

== T ==
- "Tinerețe fără bătrânețe și viață fără de moarte" ("Youth Without Aging and Life Without Death")
- "Trandafiru", by Arthur Carl Victor Schott and Albert Schott

== U ==
- "Ursul păcălit de vulpe"

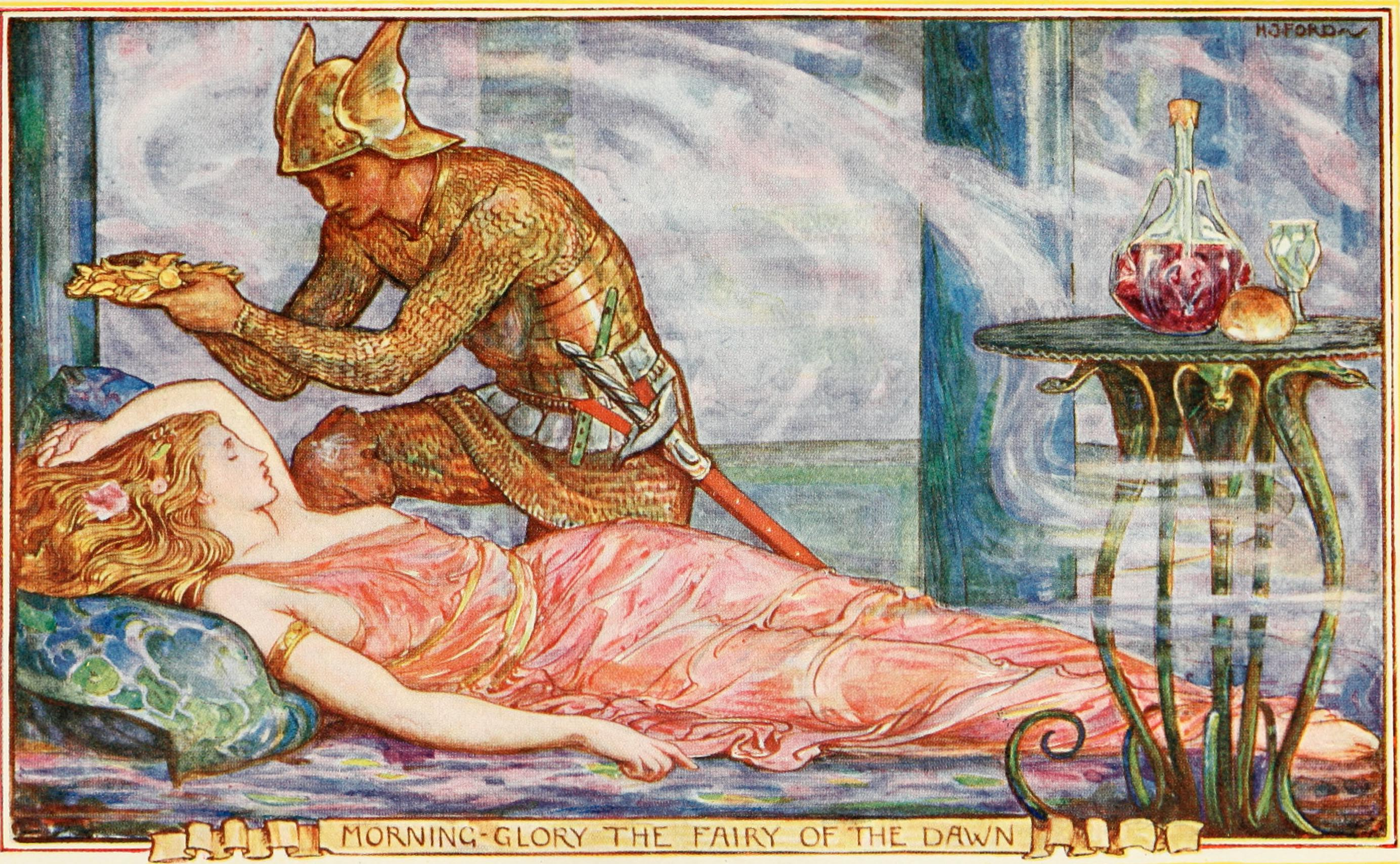
The Fairy Aurora

== Z ==
- "Zâna Zorilor" (The Fairy Aurora)

== Fairy tales from Bukovina ==
- The Flower Queen's Daughter
- The Hazelnut Child

== See also ==
- List of fairy tales
- Folklore of Romania
