= Iele =

Feminine mythical creatures

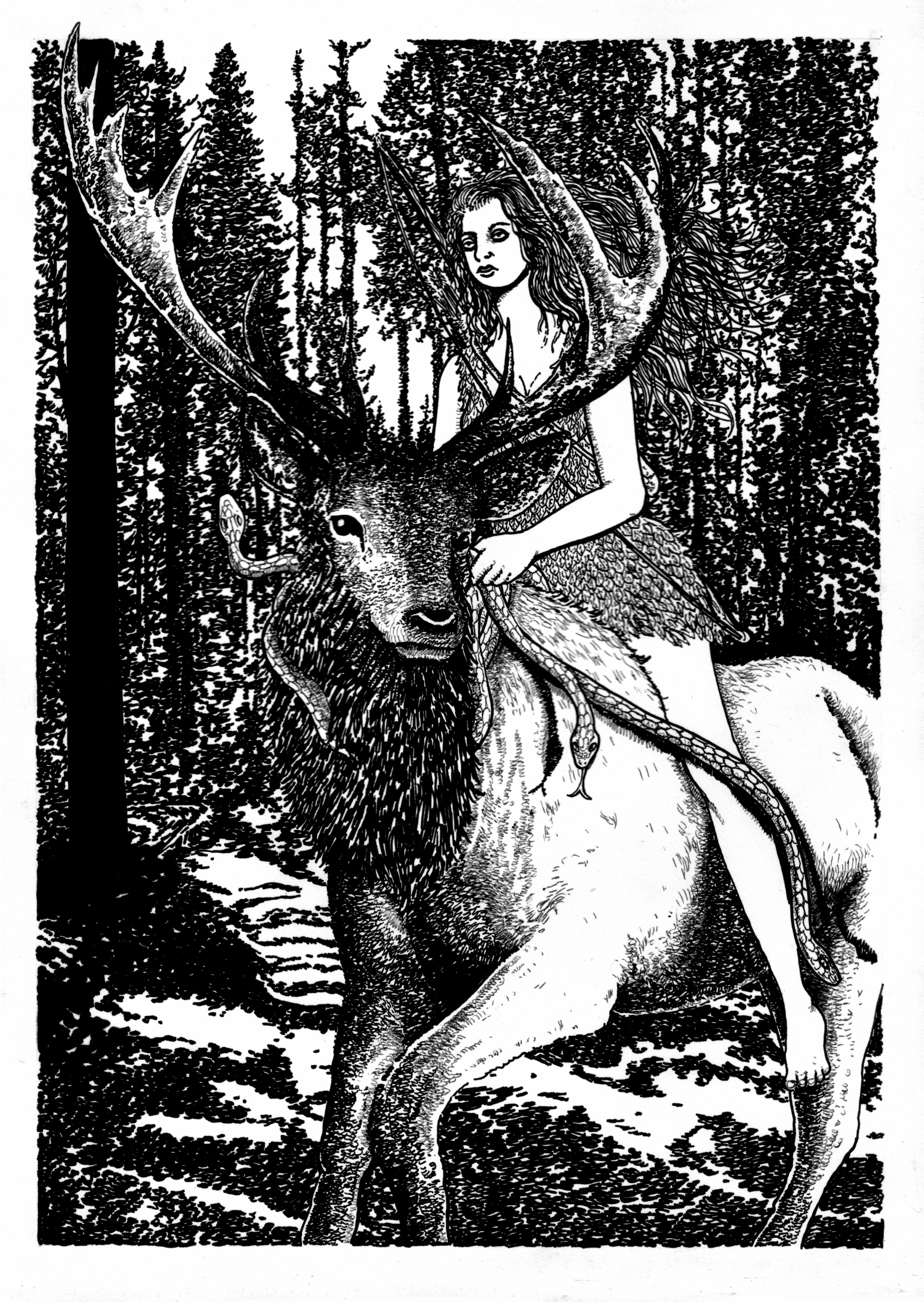
Wiła (Variant spelling of iele) by Andy Paciorek.

The iele are feminine mythical creatures in Romanian mythology. There are several differing descriptions of their characteristics. Often they are described as faeries (zâne in Romanian), with great seductive power over men, with magic skills and attributes similar to nymphs, naiads and dryads found in Greek mythology.

== Locations ==
The iele are said to live in the sky, in forests, in caves and on isolated mountain cliffs, and reported to have been seen bathing in springs or at crossroads. From this point of view, the Iele are similar to the Ancient Greek Hecate, a three headed goddess of Thracian origin, who guards crossroads.

== Activities ==
They mostly appear at night by moonlight, as dancing Horas, in secluded areas such as glades, the tops of certain trees (maples, walnut trees), ponds, river sides, crossroads or abandoned fireplaces, dancing naked, with their breasts almost covered by their disheveled hair, with bells on their ankles and carrying candles. In almost all of these instances, the Iele appear to be incorporeal. Rarely, they are dressed in chain mail coats. The effect of their specific dance, the Hora is similar to the dances of the Bacchantes.

== Scorching ==
The place where they had danced would after remain carbonized, with the grass incapable of growing on the trodden ground, and with the leaves of the surrounding trees scorched. Later, when grass would finally grow, it would have a red or dark-green color, the animals would not eat it, but instead mushrooms would thrive on it.

== Names ==
Dimitrie Cantemir describes the iele as "Nymphs of the air, in love especially with young men" in his Descriptio Moldaviae. The origin of these beliefs is unknown. Incidentally, the noun iele is phonetically close to the feminine plural form of the Romanian word for "they". Their real names are secret and inaccessible, and are commonly replaced with nicknames based on their characteristics. The names based on epithets are: Iele, Dânse, Drăgaice, Vâlve, Iezme, Izme, Irodiţe, Rusalii, Nagode, Vântoase, Domniţe, Măiestre, Frumoase, Muşate, Fetele Codrului, Împărătesele Văzduhului, Zânioare, Sfinte de noapte, Şoimane, Mândre, Fecioare, Albe, Hale, etc. But there are also personal names which appear: Ana, Bugiana, Dumernica, Foiofia, Lacargia, Magdalina, Ruxanda, Tiranda, Trandafira, Rudeana, Ruja, Păscuţa, Cosânzeana, Orgisceana, Lemnica, Roşia, Todosia, Sandalina, Margalina, Savatina, Rujalina, etc. These names must not be used randomly, as they may be the basis for dangerous enchantments. It is believed that every witch knows nine of these pseudonyms, from which she makes combinations, and which are the basis for spells.

== Character ==
The iele are said not to be solitary creatures, but gather in groups in the air, where they can fly with or without wings; they can travel with incredible speeds, either on their own, or with chariots of fire. The iele appear sometimes with bodies, at other times only as immaterial spirits. They are young and beautiful, voluptuous immortals, their frenzy causing delirium in onlookers, and with bad tempers, but not being necessarily evil. They come in groups of three or seven. This version is mostly found in Oltenia, were three Iele are considered the daughters of Alexander the Great, called Catrina, Zalina and Marina.

=== Sometimes evil ===
They are not generally considered evil genii: they resort to revenge only when they are provoked, offended, seen while they dance, when people step on the trodden ground left behind by their dance, sleep under a tree which the Iele consider as their property, drink from the springs or wells used by them. Terrible punishments are inflicted upon the ones who refuse their invitation to dance, or the ones who mimic their movements. The one who randomly hears their songs becomes instantly mute. A main characteristic is their beautiful voices which are used to enchant their listeners, just like the Sirens from ancient Greek mythology. Invisible to humans, there are however certain moments when they can be seen by mortals, such as when they dance at night. When this happens, they abduct the victim, punishing the "guilty" one with magical spells, after they previously caused him to fall into sleep with the sounds and the vertigo of the frenetic Hora, which they dance around their victim, who is abducted, to disappear forever without a trace.

=== Vengeance ===
The iele are also believed to be agents of revenge for God or of the Devil, having the right to avenge in the name of their employers. When they are called upon to act, they hound their victims into the center of their dance, until they die in a furor of madness or torment. In this hypostasis, the Iele are similar to the Ancient Greek Erinyes and the Roman Furies.

== Appeasing the Iele ==
To please the iele, people dedicated festival days to them: the Rusaliile, the Stratul, the Sfredelul or Bulciul Rusaliilor, the nine days after the Easter, the Marina etc. Anyone not respecting these holidays was said to suffer the revenge of the Iele: men and women who work during these days would be lifted in spinning vertigo, people and cattle would suffer mysterious deaths or become paralyzed and crippled, hail would fall, rivers would flood, trees would wither, and houses would catch fire.

People also invented cures against the iele, either preventive or exorcistic in nature: garlic and mugwort worn around the waist, in the bosom, or hung from the hat; or hanging the skull of a horse on a pole in front of the house. The most important cure is the dance of Călușari. This custom was the subject of an episode of the popular TV series, The X-Files (see The Calusari).

== Comparison with other mythologies ==
The same common Indo-European mythological base is suggested by the close resemblance with the Nordic Elves, youthful feminine humanoid spirits of great beauty living in forests and other natural places, underground, or in wells and springs; having as a sacred tree the same maple tree; and with magical powers, such as having the ability to cast spells with their circle dances. The elves also leave a kind of circle where they had danced, the älvdanser ("elf dances") or älvringar ("elf circles"). Typically, this circle also consisted of a ring of small mushrooms. Arguably, Iele are the Romanian equivalent of the fairies of other cultures, like the nymphs of Greek and Roman mythology, the vili from Slavic mythology, and the Irish sídhe.

== Modern sightings ==
There is some discussion on the topic that an episode of "Destination Truth"; which had a follow-up episode may have encountered Iele. The Romanian forest episode, in the episode they believed they were encountering ghosts or aliens. Some viewers went to the online boards for the show discussing that the events and behavior closely tied with the Iele. Private recordings of high-pitched female laughs and screams emanating from Romanian forests at night have also been published online.

== Bibliography ==
- Victor Kernbach, Dicţionar de mitologie generală, Ed. Albatros, București, 1995, pp. 256–257.
