= The Three Golden Pomegranates =

Romanian folk tale about a maiden from a fruit

Folk tale
- Name: The Three Golden Pomegranates
- Also known as: Cele trei rodii aurite; Three Gilded Pomegranates
- Aarne–Thompson grouping: ATU 408, "The Love for Three Oranges"
- Region: Romania
- Related: Legende sau basmele româniloru adunate din gura poporului, by Petre Ispirescu (1892)

Cele trei rodii aurite (English: The Three Golden Pomegranates; Three Gilded Pomegranates) is a Romanian folktale, first collected by author Petre Ispirescu. It is classified as tale type ATU 408, "The Love for Three Oranges", of the international Aarne-Thompson-Uther Index. As with The Three Oranges, the tale deals with a prince's search for a bride that lives inside a fruit, who is replaced by a false bride and goes through a cycle of incarnations, until she regains physical form again.

== Source ==
According to Ispirescu, the tale was provided by his wife Sebastica, from recollections of her childhood in 1858, when she heard it from a servant named Joița.

== Summary ==
In this tale, a prince is feeling downcast. He spots an old woman coming to their garden and throws a stone at a jug she is carrying, breaking it. Annoyed, she curses him to never marry until he finds the three golden pomegranates. Wondering about the old woman's words, he decides to venture into the world and seek such fruits. He passes by three hermit women who direct him to a garden guarded by its guardians: a dragon (which he greets), a baker woman cleaning an oven (to whom he gives a rag), a dirty and slimy well (which he cleans off) and a gate covered with cobwebs (which he cleans). He steals the three pomegranates and rushes back to the hermit woman, and the garden trembles to alert its guardians to stop him, but, due to the prince's kind actions, he leaves unscathed. The prince returns home and opens each of the fruits on the way: from each a woman comes out and asks for water; he cannot give water to the first two, who die of thirst. The third girl survives for the prince gives her water, and guides her up a tree, while he goes to the castle to bring his father to meet her.

While he is away, a gypsy girl comes in to draw water in the well and finds the fairy maiden's visage in water, mistaking it for her own. She returns home to complain to her mistress about doing chores if she has such beauty, and is humiliated. So she returns to the well and notices the fairy maiden up the tree. The fairy maiden commands the tree to raise her to the treetop, and the fairy maiden falls asleep on her lap. The gypsy woman then sticks a poisoned pin in the fairy's hair and turns her into a golden bird, then takes her place. As the bird flies around the tree, the gypsy woman promises to kill it, and waits for the prince. After a few days, the prince returns with an army and musicians and notices the girl atop the tree does not look like the one he released, but the gypsy woman lies that the Sun darkened her skin and the wind swept her hair. Still, the prince takes her as his bride, despite suspecting something about her.

After the marriage, the golden bird flies near the prince's garden and asks the cook about the prince and his bride, wishing a restful sleep for him and an restless, furious sleep for her. The bird's words also cause some trees to rot, and a gardener alerts the prince. The prince orders for tar to be places on some branches and the bird perches atop one, being glued to it. The prince captures the bird and places it in a cage, but the false bride feigns illness and wishes to have the bird killed and cooked. It happens thus, but a fir tree sprouts from its blood. Still in danger, the false bride feigns another illness and orders the tree to be felled so she could bathe in its ashes. It happens thus. A beggar woman watches the fir tree being chopped down and takes with her a splinter to her home to use as pot lid. The fairy maiden comes out of the splinter to do chores for the beggar woman, is found out by the beggar and adopted as her daughter. One day, the fairy maiden asks the beggar woman to buy some linen, which she uses to sew scarves with images of her story. The scarves are given to the prince, who realizes the gypsy girl's deception and executes her. He then takes the fairy maiden to the castle and marries her.

== Analysis ==
=== Tale type ===
The tale is classified in the international Aarne-Thompson-Uther Index as tale type ATU 408, "The Three Oranges". In an article in Enzyklopädie des Märchens, scholar Christine Shojaei Kawan separated the tale type into six sections, and stated that parts 3 to 5 represented the "core" of the story:

1. A prince is cursed by an old woman to seek the fruit princess;
2. The prince finds helpers that guide him to the princess's location;
3. The prince finds the fruits (usually three), releases the maidens inside, but only the third survives;
4. The prince leaves the princess up a tree near a spring or stream, and a slave or servant sees the princess's reflection in the water;
5. The slave or servant replaces the princess (transformation sequence);
6. The fruit princess and the prince reunite, and the false bride is punished.

=== Motifs ===
==== The maiden's appearance ====
According to the tale description in the international index, the maiden may appear out of the titular citrus fruits, like oranges and lemons. However, she may also come out of pomegranates or other species of fruits, and even eggs. According to Walter Anderson's unpublished manuscript, variants with eggs instead of fruits appear in Southeastern Europe. In addition, Christine Shojaei-Kawan located the motif of the heroine emerging from the eggs in Slavic texts.

==== The transformations and the false bride ====
The tale type is characterized by the substitution of the fairy wife for a false bride. The usual occurrence is when the false bride (a witch or a slave) sticks a magical pin into the maiden's head or hair and she becomes a dove. (Note: "The motif of a woman stabbed in her head with a pin occurs in AT 403 (in India) and in AT 408 (in the Middle East and southern Europe).") In some tales, the fruit maiden regains her human form and must bribe the false bride for three nights with her beloved.

In other variants, the maiden goes through a series of transformations after her liberation from the fruit and regains a physical body. (Note: As Hungarian-American scholar Linda Dégh put it, "(...) the Orange Maiden (AaTh 408) becomes a princess. She is killed repeatedly by the substitute wife's mother, but returns as a tree, a pot cover, a rosemary, or a dove, from which shape she seven times regains her human shape, as beautiful as she ever was".) In that regard, according to Christine Shojaei-Kawan's article, Christine Goldberg divided the tale type into two forms. In the first subtype, indexed as AaTh 408A, the fruit maiden suffers the cycle of metamorphosis (fish-tree-human) - a motif Goldberg locates "from the Middle East to Italy and France" (especifically, it appears in Greece and Eastern Europe). In the second subtype, AaTh 408B, the girl is transformed into a dove by the needle.

Separated from her husband, she goes to the palace (alone or with other maidens) to tell tales to the king. She shares her story with the audience and is recognized by him.

== Variants ==
According to ethnologue Ovidiu Birlea, the tale is "widespread" in Wallachia (Muntenia), but appears sporadically in Moldova and Banat. Writer and folklorist Cristea Sandu Timoc noted that Romanian variants of the tale type were found in Southern Romania, where the type was also known as Fata din Dafin ("The Bay-Tree Maiden"). In the Romanian texts, the fruit maiden comes out of apples, and, more rarely, from lemons and pomegranates, and may turn into a bird (dove) or a basil. In variants from Muntenia, the heroine and her sisters live in a laurel tree (Romanian: dafin). Folklorist Elena Niculiță-Voronca also mentioned the existence of a variant with a "fata citroanei" (girl from the lemon), from Ardeal, and a "fata de perj" (girl from the plum tree), from Moldova (ro).

=== The Unborn, Never-Seen ===
In a Romanian variant collected by Arthur and Albert Schott from the Banat region, Die Ungeborene, Niegesehene ("The Unborn, Never Seen [Woman]"), a farmer couple prays to God for a son. He is born. Whenever he cries, his mother rocks his sleep by saying he will marry "a woman that was not born nor any man has ever seen". When he comes of age, he decides to seek her. He meets Mother Midweek (Wednesday), Mother Friday and Mother Sunday. They each give him a golden apple and tell him to go near a water source and wait until a maiden appears; she will ask for a drink of water and after he must give her the apple. He fails the first two times, but meets a third maiden; he asks her to wait on top of a tree until he returns with some clothes. Some time later, a "gypsy girl" comes and sees the girl. She puts a magic pin on her hair and turns her into a dove. The tale was also translated to French as Celle qui n'est pas née et qu'on n'a jamais vue ("The One who was never born, nor never seen").

=== The Three Golden Fruits ===
Writer and folklorist Cristea Sandu Timoc collected a Romanian variant from teller Florescu Floarea, from Vidin, with the title Cele trei roade de aur ("The Three Golden Fruits"). In this tale, an orphan youth with leprosy goes to draw water from a well, when he hears a voice coming from the well, telling him to go to the enchanted land in search of the three golden fruits in order to be cured from his leprosy. Armed with this information, the youth rides his horse to the enchanted land, crossing valleys, seas and gaps, until he reaches the garden of the golden fruits. He steals three fruits and makes his way back. On the road, he stops by a well to rest and give water to his horse, and opens the first golden apple: a beautiful golden-haired zîna (fairy) emerges and asks for water, but dies for not getting any to drink. The youth buries the fairy, and moves on. By another well, he cuts open the second golden apple and releases another fairy, who asks for water but dies for not getting any. Finally, the youth opens the last apple near a third well, and gives water to the fairy. The fairy then tells the youth to wash his face with water from the well, since it contains water from the enchanted land. He does and heals his leprosy. The fairy gives him some sacks of gold for him to buy carriages and other provisions for their wedding. While the youth is away, a gypsy woman replaces the fairy. The story then flashbacks to show how the fairy was replaced: a gypsy woman came to draw water and found the maiden's reflection in the water, mistaking it for her own. The gypsy brought her own mother, a witch, to the well, and the witch noticed the apple fairy upon a nearby tree. The witch killed the fairy and hid her body under some bushes, then placed her own daughter upon the tree. When the youth returns with a retinue of musicians and fiddlers, he notices the fairy is now dark-skinned, but the gypsy girl lies that she is his bride. However, the fairy maiden's voice echoes from the bushes that she is a liar - the story explains a hedgehog brought a reviving herb to cure the fairy. The youth reunites with the fairy and marries her.

=== An emperor has three sons ===
In a Romanian tale published by Ovidiu Bîrlea with the title A fost odată un împărat ș-avea 3 copii ("Once upon a time an emperor had three sons"), a emperor has three sons, the elder two already married, save the youngest, who is single and a troublemaker, for he throws pebbles at windows. One day, he announces he is going to look for a bride. On the road, he meets an old woman, who gives him three nuts, for him to break near a well and have some water and bread on him. The prince walks a bit more and cracks open the first nut with a rock: out comes a zîna (fairy) that asks for water and bread, but dies, since the prince has none with him. He cracks open the second one and out comes the second zîna, who also dies due to not getting any food nor drink. The prince then withholds the third nut until he reaches a well, cracks open the last fruit and gives water and bread to the third zîna. He tells her he must get his parents before they marry, and lets the zîna up a nearby tree. While he is away, two gypsy woman approach the well and see the nut fairy's visage in water, then notice her up the tree. The gypsy mother asks the fairy to lend her clothes for her daughter to try on, which the nut fairy does, then the elder gypsy sticks a pin in her head, turning her into two goldfishes that jump into the well. The gypsy mother places her daughter up the tree and the prince returns, notices she looks darker-skinned, but takes her as his bride. The king then sends servants to fetch water from the well and bring the two goldfishes to the prince. The prince admires the fishes, but the false bride asks him to have them killed and cooked, and their scales must be burnt in a fire. It happens thus, but a golden scale flies out of the window and fall in the garden, where a nut tree sprouts, yielding golden nuts. The false bride asks the tree to be cut down and its wood to be tossed in a pyre, which the prince agrees to do. However, as the woodcutters are burning the tree, a splinter flies off to the road, which an old woman pockets and brings home. When the old woman is not at home, the nut fairy comes out of the splinter, does chores for her, then hides in the splinter. After three days of the mystery, the old woman discovers the nut fairy and adopts her, and the nut fairy asks her not to inform the prince. Later, the prince invites the populace to his court to tell stories, and the nut fairy comes to tell a tale: she recounts how the prince found her, placed her atop the tree, how the gypsy woman tricked her and killed her, how she transformed. The false bride tries to interrupt the nut fairy, no to avail, and she quakes with fear. The prince realizes the nut fairy is his true bride and marries her.

== Bibliography ==
- Șăineanu, Lazăr. Basmele române: în comparatiune cu legendele antice clasice și în legătură cu basmele popoarelor învecinate și ale tuturor popoarelor romanice: studiu comparativǔ. București: Göbl, 1895. pp. 303-310.
