= Ivan Turbincă =

Romanian short story

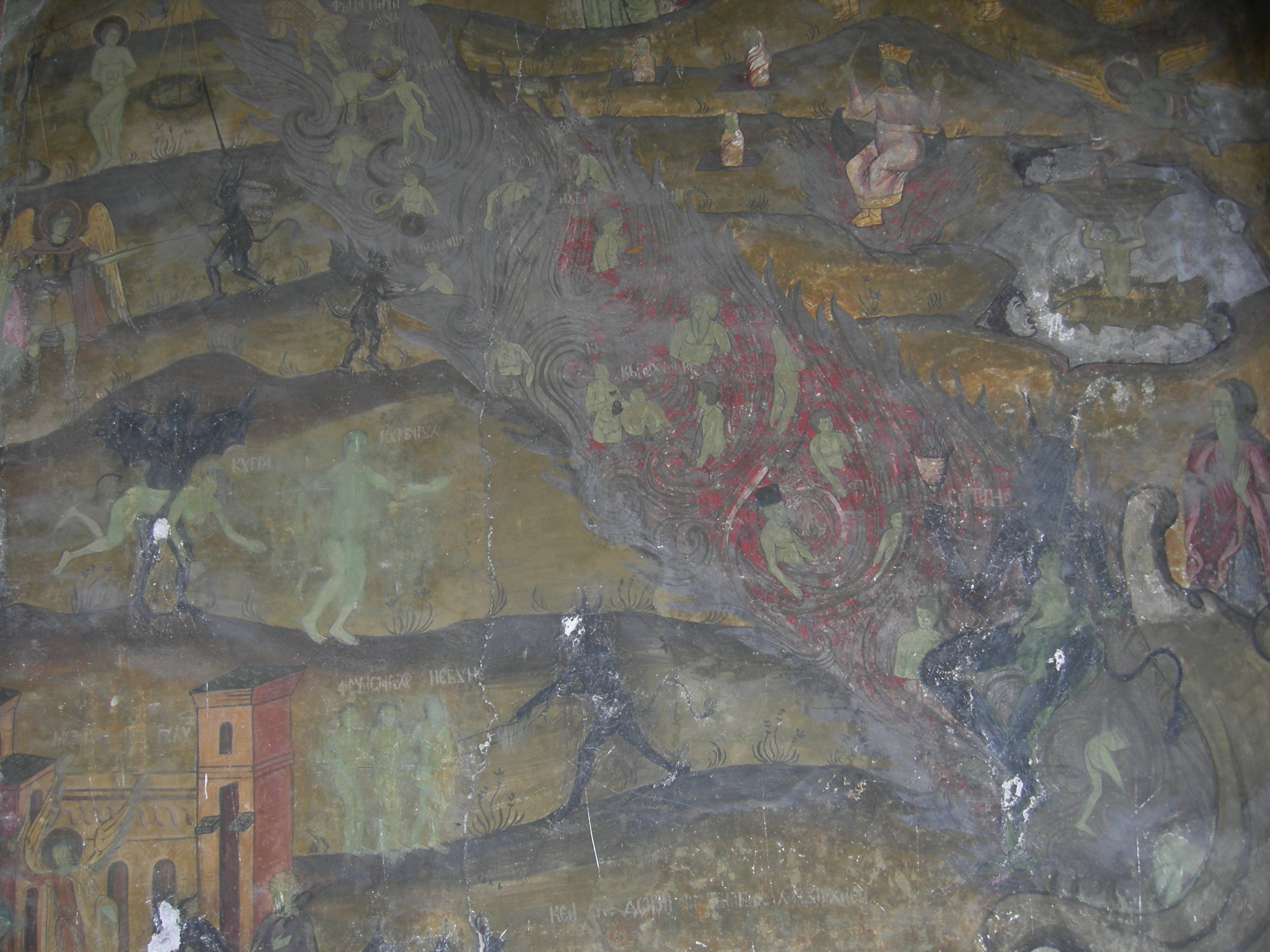
Depiction of Hell in an 18th-century Romanian Orthodox mural (Sfântul Elefterie Vechi, Bucharest)

"Ivan Turbincă" (Romanian pronunciation: [iˈvan turˈbiŋkə]; in full Povestea lui Ivan Turbincă, "The Story of Ivan Turbincă") is an 1880 short story, fairy tale and satirical text by Romanian writer Ion Creangă, echoing themes common in Romanian and European folklore. It recounts the adventures of an eponymous Russian soldier, who passes between the world of the living, Heaven and Hell, on a quest for immortality. In the beginning of the story, God rewards Ivan's charitable nature with a pouch that allows him to trap all things in existence, which is used by the soldier to subdue Satan and the multitude of devils, and eventually serve his purpose of cheating Death. The text also includes a portrayal of Saint Peter as the gatekeeper of Heaven, a reference to the miraculous powers of Saint Nicholas, as well as humorous references to the lifestyle of local aristocrats, or boyars. The protagonist himself is shown to be devoted and intelligent, but is primarily motivated by partying and drinking, activities which he engages in for eternity.

One of Creangă's celebrated contributions to Romanian literature, "Ivan Turbincă" has become a familiar point of reference for the reading public and critics in both Romania and Moldova. It has notably inspired a short story by Moldovan author Vlad Ioviță and the 1967 Moldovan film Se caută un paznic.

== Plot ==
=== Early adventures ===
The "Ivan Turbincă" story opens with a brief overview of the protagonist's life in the Imperial Russian Army, which had been his home from childhood. Having survived over the age limit, Ivan is given his weapons and two rubles, and released from service. While traveling down a country road, he ends up walking behind God and Saint Peter, who are visiting the world of humans incognito. When Saint Peter expresses alarm at the sight of a soldier who might be prone to mistreating civilians, God informs him that Ivan is a kind man of outstanding generosity, and urges Peter to test that himself. They transform themselves into beggars, and wait at each end of a bridge for Ivan to pass through. The soldier proceeds to give them both of his rubles, stating that "God will again render onto me, for there's more of his to give." As Ivan leaves the scene, the moved Peter urges his divine companion to reward the soldier. They both catch up with him, whereupon God reveals himself and lets the astonished Ivan have his money back. The soldier kneels and prays God to bless his army issue pouch (turbincă), "so that I may be able to pack inside of it anybody I may wish; and so that they could never get out without my approval." The amused God grants him this wish, and, before leaving, informs Ivan that, should he ever feel tired of roaming the land, he'll be welcomed to knock on the gate of Heaven.

The old soldier continues his aimless travel, determined to put his pouch to the test. That evening, he reaches the house of a boyar, and, profiting from his "Imperial man" status, demands and receives lodging. The reluctant and stingy boyar decides to trick the unwelcome guest by making him sleep inside the only one of his houses where devils are supposed to be roaming. The soldier falls asleep on a divan, only to be rudely awakened when his pillow is thrown away by invisible hands, and again when the entire room is animated by loud, onomatopoeic sounds. Ivan puts a stop to this when he yells Pașol na turbinca! (an approximate Romanian rendition of the Russian for "Get into the pouch!"), and all devils throughout the boyar's house are absorbed into his small container. He falls back to sleep, but is again woken up by Satan himself (referred to with the popular etymology Scaraoschi), who is infuriated by the loss of his servants, and slaps the soldier over the face. Ivan is much annoyed by this, and promptly orders his aggressor into the pouch, with the other devils. At daybreak, Ivan takes his revenge on the boyar by awaking his entire household, and claiming that he has spent the night trapping rabbits in his bag, and asks the host to provide him with ramrods so that he may peel the skin off the animals. The boyar, understanding of what Ivan means, hands him "a cartload" of sticks, whereupon the protagonist drags the devils out one by one and gives each of them a severe beating, making them promise never to return. The emotional boyar embraces the rescuer of his property and offers him permanent lodging, but Ivan declines, stating that his task is to defend God, "every man's emperor". As he leaves the premises, the narrator notes: "It seems to me that the boyar himself [...] had come to fear the pouch, so he did not feel too sorry at seeing Ivan leave".

=== Cheating Death ===
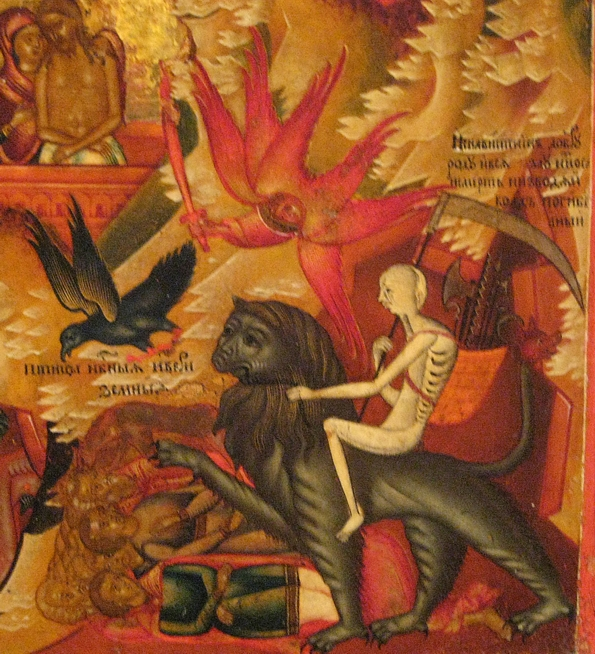
Depiction of Death in an 18th-century Russian icon

Back on the road, Ivan states his new purpose, that of finding out where God dwells, and invokes the help of Saint Nicholas. Immediately after kissing an icon of the saint, he finds himself transported to the gate of Heaven. He repeatedly bangs on it, until Saint Peter, the gatekeeper, asks him to state his name and purpose. Still on the other side of the door, Ivan inquires about the essentials of Heaven, being informed that the place does not hold tobacco, vodka, women or lăutari (fiddlers), but that he will find all of these in Hell. He rushes there, and has a similar conversation with one of the devils, whose report is to Ivan's satisfaction. Once the gate is opened, the devils find themselves perplexed and, recalling their earlier encounter with the soldier, decide to service him and tolerate his whims. They are left despondent by their new master's drunken partying and exploitative demands, until the creature known as Talpa iadului ("The Foundation of Hell"), portrayed as the cleverest demon, promises to overturn the situation: she creates a drum, and bangs the rhythm of a march on it, tricking the inebriated soldier into believing that war has started. He takes hold of his belongings and rushes out of Hell, leaving the devils to lock the gate behind him.

Ivan then falls back on his original plan of serving God, and returns to the entrance of Heaven, which he obstinately guards for days on end. He is there as a self-appointed guard when Death herself attempts to report back to God for instructions, and, as she insists on getting past him, traps her in the pouch. Leaving the item to hang on a tree, the soldier again bangs on the door, and is allowed inside Heaven for an audience with God. He proceeds to inform divinity that Death is at the gate, but without specifying that she is his prisoner, and asks what orders he should relay. Amused by Ivan's behavior, God asks him to tell the visitor that, for the following three years, she should only kidnap the old folk "such as yourself". The soldier returns, releases his prisoners, and tweaks the original order to say that Death must roam the forests and consume the old trees within the space of three years. This she does and, when the term expires and she runs back to Heaven, she is shocked to find the soldier is still by the gate. A heated exchange follows, at the end of which Ivan sends Death back into the pouch and leaves for another audience with God. The latter, the narrator informs, is aware of Ivan's ruse, but decides to play along: he lets his guest know that he should tell Death to capture the young for three years, and then misbehaved children for another three. Ivan again misinterprets the command, forcing Death to eat first young trees, then twigs, for a total of six years. Once her ordeal is over, she is back at Heaven's entrance, and again in front of Ivan. He again traps her, telling her that this is revenge for people she has killed "since Adam", and informing her that she will no longer be allowed out of the bag.

The episode is interrupted by God, who lets Ivan know that he should hand in his pouch and prepare for his own timely death, leaving him three days to prepare. The man uses this interval to reflect on his adventures and fashion himself a coffin. When newly released Death returns to him, Ivan claims not to be aware of how people are supposed to be laid to rest. He exasperates his adversary by dropping himself into the coffin every which way but the proper one, until she decides to teach him by personal example. Once Death is on her back, eyes closed and hands crossed on her chest, Ivan seals the coffin lid and traps her inside. God again intervenes, and is shown to be upset about the soldier's tricks: while he resigns in front of Ivan's determination to live, he punishes him to spend eternity as an old man. The story ends with the indication that Ivan went on to party for ever, boozing and attending a succession of guleaiuri (banquets or wedding parties), and that "he may still be alive now, if he did not die in the meantime."

== Critical reception and legacy ==
Ion Creangă's version of the story probably incorporates an old theme in Romanian folklore and is believed to be an echo of themes shared by several European traditions. Writing early in the 20th century, researcher Tudor Pamfile integrated "Ivan Turbincă" within a large framework of Eastern European folkloric accounts in which Death or Samodiva are the antagonists. Also according to Pamfile, the story of a soldier escaping fatality in a fashion similar to Ivan's is present in Ukrainian folklore. The interest in uncovering the links between Creangă's stories and oral literature was later pursued by other commentators. Focusing on the episode in which Ivan plays stupid in front of Death, Romanian researcher of children's literature Muguraş Constantinescu described the similarity between Creangă's character and Till Eulenspiegel, a popular character in German folklore. Constantinescu, who analyzed the manner in which old age is depicted in the 19th-century writer's work, saw "Ivan Turbincă" as standing for a "well-adjusted, cheerful, jovial side" of man's final years, concluding: "Even if [Ivan's] eternal old age is located on the border between boredom and entertainment, it allows room for games, pranks, mischief, which may yet become characteristic for old age, too commonly associated with disease, powerlessness, sadness." Literary historian Mircea Braga, who discussed the presence of folkloric narrative motifs in Creangă's main stories, noted that such texts are usually introduced by a "perturbing situation"—in the case of "Ivan Turbincă", the acquisition of "an item with miraculous qualities." Another such omnipresent element, Braga argues, is the series of "trials" which are imposed on the various protagonists, and which, in this case, are found "in the haunted house episode, in that of hellish partying or in Death's successive pressures." Essayist and literary chronicler Gheorghe Grigurcu comments on the manner in which protagonist defies Death, seeing it as "probably an archaic manner of conjuration, the residue of a magic ritual."

A controversial reinterpretation of the story was publicized during the final stages of Romania's communist regime, when the official national communist ideology came to endorse radically nationalist claims such as protochronism. At that stage, retrospectively called "cultural megalomania" by historian Lucian Boia, protochronist ideologue Dan Zamfirescu claimed that Ion Creangă was equal or superior to world classics Homer, William Shakespeare and Johann Wolfgang von Goethe, and found Ivan Turbincă, "the character who dominates world history in our century", to be "more contemporary than Hamlet, Faust, Don Quixote, and Alyosha Karamazov". Outside of this context, the story served to inspire the Timișoara-based writer Şerban Foarţă, who used it as the basis for a 1983 adaptation for the Romanian stage. According to theater chronicler Sanda Diaconescu, the text was fused with fragments from Creangă's other works, and, in general, with "gems from the archaic treasures of Romanian folklore."

The "Ivan Turbincă" story is also popular in Romania's neighboring state of Moldova, which, as the Moldavian SSR, has been part of the Soviet Union and is historically included in the region of Bessarabia. The 1967 film Se caută un paznic, made by writer Vlad Ioviţă and director Gheorghe Vodă, was loosely based on the Creangă narrative, and constituted an early sample of Moldovan cinema. Structured around a similarly titled experimental prose work by Ioviţă, it received special notice for its musical score, the work of composer Eugen Doga: Moldovan film critic Ana-Maria Plămădeală found it in harmony with the film's "symbiosis of the comedic and the philosophical". Plămădeală also believes that the music and film both created a discreet satire of Soviet pressures on the local population: "The synthetic style of the melodic structure helps the young filmmakers to transfer Creangă's ideas into a world of totalitarian oppression, highlighting the eternal aspiration of a nation haunted by the atrocities of history toward spiritual emancipation." A similar verdict was passed on Ioviţă's original text by literary critic Viorica Stamati-Zaharia, who detected possible ironies aimed at the guidelines of socialist realism. A version of the play was staged in 2009 by Moldovan actor-director Ion Sapdaru, and was notably hosted by the National Theatre Bucharest.

The story is among those of Ion Creangă's that have been known to an English-speaking audience since the interwar period, when they were first circulated in translation. According to British author Paul Bailey, the versions rely on archaisms and are unsatisfactory; he recommended new translations, in particular one of the "terribly amusing" "Ivan Turbincă".

== See also ==
- List of Romanian fairy tales
