= Doamna Neaga =

Romanian folklore heroine

Doamna Neaga is the heroine of many tales in Romanian folklore. She is allegedly based on a real individual who lived in 17th-century Wallachia. According to the legends, she owned many beautiful and well-hidden estates in the Buzău region, where she used to hide with her servants during Tatar incursions.
