= Apa Sâmbetei =

Mythological world ocean

In Romanian mythology, Apa Sâmbetei (Romanian pronunciation: [ˈapa ˈsɨmbetej]; lit. saturday's water) is the name given to the World Ocean, the ocean that was said to encompass the entire earth. Its description varies by region, being described as boiling due to the proximity of hell (in Bucovina), or as cold as the Kingdom of God is said to be built upon it.

It is said that the souls of the deceased follow the course of rivers into the Apa Sâmbetei. The currents of this ocean encircle the earth three times before descending into hell for the purpose of transporting the souls to the afterlife. It is because of this belief that Romanians make the sign of the cross before drinking from a stream, in order to ensure that they do not "drink" one such soul.

Also in Bucovina, it is believed that a woman is unable to cross the Apa Sâmbetei, but only men, especially the monks who were considered to live a pious life.

== Contemporary use ==
The Saturday's Water is often used in colloquial Romanian in the expression s-a dus pe Apa Sâmbetei! (it has gone on the Saturday's Water), meaning that something has gone wrong or been wasted.
