= Iovan Iorgovan =

Iovan Iorgovan is a character in Romanian mythology, similar in some ways to Hercules. The legend is present in the Valea Cernei valley of south-western Oltenia. In the legend, Iovan is named "fiu de rămlean", which can be translated as "son of Rome".
