= Vântoase =

Creatures in Romanian folklore

Vântoase are creatures present in Romanian folklore, as a sort of female spirits (iele). Popular beliefs describe them as capable of causing dust storms and powerful winds, similar to harpies. They live in forests, in the air, in deep lakes, and use a special wagon for traveling. The Vântoase are also believed to be capable of attacking children, and the only protection against them is the mysterious "grass of the winds".
