= Xana =

Mythological entity

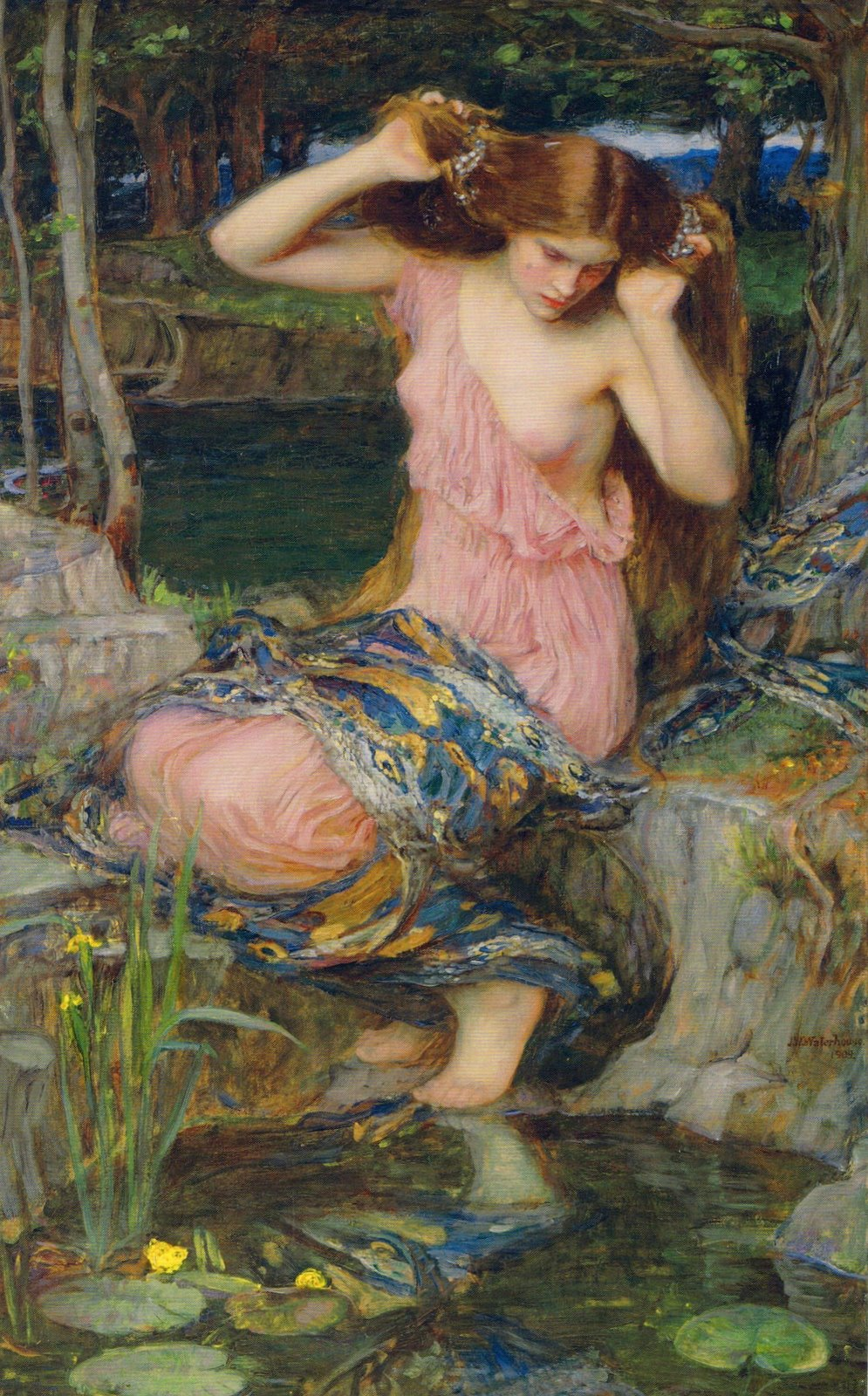
Xana (Lamia, John William Waterhouse, 1909).

The xana (Asturian: /ˈʃana/or [ˈɕa.na]) is a character found in Asturian mythology. Always female, she is a creature of extraordinary beauty believed to live in fountains, rivers, waterfalls, or forested regions with pure water. The origin of the Asturian word xana is unclear, though some scholars see it as a derivation from the Latin name for the goddess Diana. References to where the mythological xanas lived are still common in Asturian toponyms. They also appear in Eastern Galician and Cantabrian mythology (Anjanas).

== Characteristics ==
The xanas promise treasures and can be disenchanted. Some xanas also attack people and steal their food. They live in fountains and caves.

A xana can be a beneficial spirit, offering "love water" to travellers and rewards of gold or silver to those found worthy through some undefined judgment. Their hypnotic voices can be heard during spring and summer nights. Those who have a pure soul and hear the song will be filled with a sense of peace and love. Those whose souls are not pure will feel they are being suffocated and may be driven insane.

== Xaninos ==
Xanas have children called xaninos (singular: xanín), but because they cannot take care of them—xanas cannot produce milk to feed their babies—they usually take a human baby from his cradle and put their own fairy child in instead, similar to changelings in other cultures. The human mother realizes this change when the baby grows up in just a few months. In order to unmask the xanín, one must put some pots and egg shells near the fire, and, if the baby is a changeling, he will exclaim, "I was born one hundred years ago, and since then I have not seen so many egg shells near the fire!"

== Folktales involving xanas ==
The stories about xanas can be divided into four broad categories. First, stories in which the xana has a child. In these stories, the xana switches her baby for that of another woman. Second, stories of xanas who suffer spells. In these stories, an act performed according to a secret ritual can break the spell. Third, xanas who possess treasures and riches. The xana may have acquired the riches accidentally, or through donation or theft; sometimes the human character of the tale obtains the treasure, but most of the times does not. Finally, stories about xanas who are malicious. The most important tales of this category are those in which the xana enters a home through a keyhole; the xana takes and enchants someone; the xana transforms into an animal; and the xana provides a magic belt.

== In literature ==
Sharpe’s Rifles Bernard Cornwell

Cuban writer Daína Chaviano uses the xana motif in her novel The Island of Eternal Love. When one of the characters encounters a xana while she is combing her hair, the dialogue between them marks a crucial twist in the plot.

Kelley Armstrong's Darkness Rising series has three characters who are believed to be xanas. Resurgent members of this supernatural race due to genetic modification: Hayley Morris, Nicole Tillson, and the deceased Serena. Given their powers and association with water, Serena's death by drowning is a point of mystery in the story.

== See also ==
- Enchanted Moura (Galician-Portuguese supernatural women)
- Zana
- Zână
