= Vâlvă =

Female spirit in Romanian folklore

Vâlvă (plural vâlve) is a female spirit mentioned in the Romanian folklore. The Vâlve are believed to walk over the hilltops at night, and are subdivided into Vâlve Albe ("White Vâlve"), who are considered beneficial, and Vâlve Negre ("Black Vâlve" or "Dark Vâlve"), who are considered evil. In certain contexts, they are believed to have human form (especially when they came to protect villages from a storm). They may also appear under various guises, such as shadows or black cats. They also have the ability to shapeshift.

== Types of Vâlve ==
The Vâlve include several types, among which are: Vâlva Apei ("of the water"), considered as a sort of guardian of the water sources and fountains; Vâlva Bucatelor (roughly, "of the morsels"), protector of the poor people, and of crops; Vâlva Băilor ("of the mines"), defender and protector of mines and tunnels, whose departure means that the deposit is coming to an end; Vâlva Banilor ("of the money"), protector of money; Vâlva Comorilor ("of the treasures"), protector of treasures, who can also signal the spot where these are buried; Vâlva Pădurii ("of the forest"), protector of woodlands, similar to Muma Padurii; Vâlva Ciumei ("of the plague"), controlling bubonic plague and other diseases; Vâlva Zilelor ("of the days"), protector of the days (there is one for each day of the week); Vâlva Cetăţilor ("of the citadels"), defender of ancient ruins.

== Vâlve of the mines ==
The best known among oral tradition are, still, the Vâlve of the mines. Legends about them flourish around traditional metal exploitation areas in Romania, such as Roşia Montană, a place extremely rich not only in gold, but also in folklore and myth. There, the people still say that you cannot find any gold in the mines without the help of a Vâlvă (which is white). But if one gets too greedy, or spends the money foolishly, or if someone steals the gold or money from the family it was originally revealed to, the Vâlvă will become a black one and will not stop until she will avenge the injustice and disrespect to her. Miners say that anyone can hear her knocking through the galleries just in the next corridor, even if there is no knowledge of that place in the rock or if you know for sure no one can be there at that time. She is producing that strange sound to search for gold to show them, or to help them not get lost. If they don't listen to her advice, the galleries collapse on them.

This might got the Efteling inspired by. The Witte Wieven of dive coaster Baron 1898 also do this all

== See also ==
- Culture of Romania
- Religion in Romania
