= Sântoaderi =

Supernatural entity of Romanian folklore

The Sântoaderi were a group of supernatural entities found in Romanian folklore. Viewed as either seven or nine young men with long feet and hooves, they were also thought of as wearing capes. It was believed that they would mysteriously appear in a village, where they would sing, beat their drums, and cause illness for people; wrapping them up in chains causing rheumatism or stamping on their bodies.

Upon hearing their music and the sound of hooves, people were advised to stay indoors, which was considered safe. Those that did not retreat indoors, could be kidnapped by the Sântoaderi and made part of the procession. The victims of such kidnappings would sometimes return in healthy condition and carrying gifts; other times, they would return sick, dying, or insane.

The Sântoaderi share some similarities with the fairies of Irish folklore. The Romanian historian Mircea Eliade also noted a similarity between the Sântoaderi and the zîne, the Romanian equivalent of the fairy godmother, both of whom were believed to travel through the night in a procession of dancers. There is also a belief that on the 24th day after Easter, the zîne and Sântoaderi meet together to play, and offer them bouquets of flowers. The name "Sântoader" derives from a regional name for Saint Theodore, with folklore suggesting that the creatures were more likely to appear on his feast day.

== See also ==
- Călușari
- Wild Hunt
