= Căpcăun =

Romanian legendary creature

A Căpcăun is a creature in Romanian folklore, depicted as an ogre who kidnaps children or young ladies (mostly princesses). It represents evil, as do its counterparts Zmeu and the Balaur. In most Romanian publications of other European works the names of creatures such as Ogres or Trolls are usually translated as căpcăun. The Romanian word appears to have meant "Dog-head" (căp being a form of cap, meaning "head", and căun a derivative of câine, "dog"). According to Romanian folkloric phantasy, the căpcăun has a dog head, sometimes with four eyes, with eyes in the nape, or with four legs, but whose main characteristic is anthropophagy.

The term căpcăun also means "Tatar chieftain" or "Turk chieftain", as well "pagan".

Some linguists consider căpcăun to be an echo of a title or administrative rank, such as kapkan (also kavhan, kaphan, kapgan) used by various Central Asian tribes who invaded Eastern Europe during late antiquity and the medieval era, such as the Pannonian Avars, Bulgars and Pechenegs.
