= Samca =

Evil spirit in Romanian mythology

Samca is an evil spirit in Romanian mythology. She most commonly takes the appearance of a naked woman with disheveled hair growing down to her heels, with small eyes that shine as brightly as the stars, with iron hands and long nails sharp as knitting needles or hooked as sickles and a tongue of fire. Other forms Samca can take are: a very large and fierce pig, a grinning dog showing awful teeth, a hairless cat with fiery, bulging eyes, a crow with bloody eyes, and a big black spider.

In its woman form, this demon has a very large, ugly and crooked mouth that always spits fire. It can come out at the end of each month, around full moon, and it usually appears to children under the age of four, who are so frightened that they become sick immediately. The disease children develop after Samca appears to them is called "the children's malice". This demon can also appear to women who are about to give birth. Once visible she would touch the pregnant women as if kneading them, scaring them so much that they either die instantly or remain crippled for life.

Samca has 19 names: Vestitia, Navadaraia, Valnomia, Sina, Nicosda, Avezuha, Scorcoila, Tiha, Miha, Grompa, Slalo, Necauza, Hatavu, Hulila, Huva, Ghiana, Gluviana, Prava, and Samca. To defend against Samca, people need to write all her 19 names on a wall of the house or have to convince someone else to write a protective spell, which they would afterwards carry on them. When attacked, this spell will make Samca harm the writer of the protective spell instead, with the exception that, if the writer of the spell was old, Samca would not hurt them, making them just grit their teeth in their sleep.

The Samca was described in 1900 by Rabbi Moses Gaster, who noted the similarities between Christian (namely Romanian, Greek, and Slavonic) and Semitic (Aramaic) charms against child-stealing, and the frequency of these tales, both oral and written, in the Balkans. Per a folk incantation recorded from "the mouth of the peasants of Roumania", Gaster described Samca as Avezuha, the "wing of Satan".

== In modern culture ==
The legend was revived thanks to a TikTok trend in late 2021 - early 2022. Users of this social platform have reported that an evil spirit attributed to Samca roams the cemeteries and country roads during the night attacking violently wanderers and travelers. Numerous deaths and unresolved crimes have been attributed to Samca over the years, however none were proven real.

In 2022, Hamilton Fringe Festival's new play contest was won by playwrights Natalia Bushnik and Kathleen Welch for their play, Samca, which used the mythology of Samca attacking pregnant women as a metaphor for abortion.
