= Marțolea =

Marțolea is a demonic entity in Romanian mythology (especially in the regions of Bucovina and Maramureș). The entity's gender is unclear, as it can shapeshift at will. It lives up in the mountains and descends on Tuesday nights to lure with its singing and punish the women caught working.

Also known as Marț-sara or Marți Seara (the old Romanian words for "Tuesday Evening"), it is a malefic entity who demands the semi-holy day of Tuesday to be respected and who forbids four women's chores: spinning of the wool, sowing, boiling laundry and baking bread. This is a pagan being. One of its equivalents is Faun.

Marțolea's punishments for these things are harsh like: killing by ripping, hanging the guts on nails to the wall and around the dishes, in the unmarried women cases. For the married women the punishments are killing or possessing their baby or their husband who is far from home.

Usually its form is of a goat with a human-like head, horns and hooves. It can shapeshift into an ugly, old woman dressed all in white, a soldier or as a handsome man. To married women, it shows as an old woman; to married men as a virgin, and to unmarried women as a young charming man.

In some regions, there is a different character called Joimârița, another form of the Romanian word for Thursday. This one, however, punishes lazy children.

Marțolea repays the women who keep the Tuesday day sacred by leaving them eggs on their doorstep or flowers from the highest mountains in Bukovina. On the first night of March, women that wear March Trinkets (Mărțișor) are repaid by Marțolea with a silver coin that the girls will have to keep all year.
