= The Bay-Tree Maiden =

Romanian fairy tale

Folk tale
- Name: The Bay-Tree Maiden
- Also known as: Fata din dafin
- Aarne–Thompson grouping: 407
- Mythology: Romanian
- Country: Romania

The Bay-Tree Maiden (Romanian: Fata din dafin) is a Romanian fairy tale about a fairy or maiden that comes out of a tree or plant and falls in love with a human prince.

In the story, the prince's mother promises to him marriage with the maiden Sanda-Lucsandra. Years later, she confesses to him that Sanda-Lucsandra does not exist. The prince sets out to find his promised bride. Later, he is convinced that two different love interests of his are Sanda-Lucsandra. He marries the maiden from the bay tree. Variants of the story have been collected in Romania, Greece and Turkey.

Folklorists have noted similarities between the tree maiden of the tale and the myth of Daphne, the maiden transformed into a laurel tree. There are also similarities to the hamadryads, dryads who live in trees. The name "Lucsandra" may derive from that of the mythical princess Cassandra (Alexandra), and from the city of Leuctra connected to her cult.

== Published sources ==
This tale was originally collected and published by author I. C. Fundescu with the name Fata din dafinu, in 1875.

According to Laura Regneala, a version of the tale, titled Fata din Dafin, was written down by Romanian folklorist G. Dem. Teodorescu in 1878, but was only published in 1894, in the magazine Ateneul Român, on the January 15th edition.

== Synopsis ==
Once, a prince began to cry six weeks before he was due to be born. Nothing his mother did placated him until she promised him that he could marry Sanda-Lucsandra, a fair maiden who lived past nine lands and nine seas. When he grew up, however, he demanded that his parents marry him to her, and when the queen confessed she had made up Sanda-Lucsandra, he set out in search of her.

He came to a great bay tree. While the prince rested under it, he heard a verse being pronounced, calling a maiden out, and a beautiful maiden came out. He seduced her, promising to marry her, and sneaked away the next morning. He came to a castle, where the master claimed that his own daughter was Sanda-Lucsandra and a wedding was arranged.

The maiden could no longer get back into the bay tree, and so set out in search of the prince. She traded her clothing, unsuitable for travel, with a monk. Then she found the carriage where the prince was bringing his bride back. The prince took her up and she told the story of seeing a maiden weeping in the meadow because a prince had seduced her, and she could no longer get into the bay tree. He had her tell it to him again and again.

At his parents' castle, on the wedding day, the monk vanished. The prince went to the room and found the monk hanging by the neck. When he went to cut her down, he realized she was the maiden and that he had not married the true Sanda-Lucsandra. He sent back the false bride and married the maiden from the bay tree.

== Translations ==
The tale was translated from the original Romanian into English with the title The Daughter of the Rose.

== Analysis ==
=== Tale type ===
Romanian scholarship classified the story in the then Aarne-Thompson Index as type AaTh 652A, "The Myrtle". This tale type refers to a myrtle born of a human woman; from the myrtle comes out a beautiful maiden or fairy, who the prince falls in love with. However, German folklorist Hans-Jörg Uther, in his revision of the Aarne-Thompson Index, in 2004, subsumed type AaTh 652A (and others about a flower girl) under only one type: ATU 407, "The Girl as Flower".

Writer and folklorist Cristea Sandu Timoc stated that the title Fata din Dafin is another name for the tale type ATU 408, The Love for Three Oranges, in variants from southern Romania.

According to Greek scholars Anna Angelopoulou and Aigle Broskou, Greek variants of former tale type 407A, "The Bayberry Child" (now subsumed under ATU 407), may involve a mother wishing for a child, even if it is some sort of plant. In regards to the ending of the tale, there are variants where the tree maiden marries the prince, and variants where both hang themselves.

=== Motifs ===
According to Felix Karlinger, in variants, the heroine's infertile mother can give birth to a bay tree, an orange tree, or to a myrtle branch. Later in the story, the laurel maiden cannot reenter the tree after kissing or spending the night with the human prince.

=== Mythological parallels ===
==== The Greek myth of Daphne ====
Fundescu stated that "Dafinu" was the name for the laurel tree in Romanian, and recalled the Greek myth of Apollo and Daphne, the maiden transformed into her arboreal namesake - a relation that folklorist Elena Niculiță-Voronca also noted. In the same vein, Felix Karlinger, citing Wiegand, posits that the "Daphne complex" from Ancient Greek mythology has been preserved in modern Aromanian and Megleno-Romanian variants of the story.

Romanian folklorist Petru Caraman (ro) also considered that the maiden harked back to the myth of Daphne. However, he noted that the maiden is not the tree, but lives in it. He argued that, since the maiden is described as a fairy or having immense, almost supernatural beauty, the tree maiden was something of a tree or nature goddess - a remnant of ancient tree worship.

==== Other parallels ====
Moses Gaster and B. Heller cited the Romanian tale Fata din Dafin as a parallel to the story of prophet Isaiah hiding inside of a cedar-tree. The hamadryads of Greek mythology (dryads who live in trees) were also listed as another parallel.

Fundescu associated the name "Sanda Lucsandra" with Cassandra, princess of Troy. According to him, "Lucsandra" may be connected to Leuctra, a region in Laconia where Pausanias described that Cassandra was known as "Alexandra".

=== Interpretation ===
Researcher Galina Kabakova sees that, in the tale type, the plant acts as a parent to the heroine; after the prince touches her, she cannot return to the tree, and has to fend for herself in the world of men. In the same vein, Felix Karlinger highlights a psychological element in variants of the story: the heroine's infertile mother eats the plant; the laurel becomes the heroine, or there is a separation between the tree and the heroine. In the latter case, the laurel tree acts as a dwelling or prenatal abode; when the heroine matures, she cannot return to the tree and must find her way in the world.

== Variants ==
=== Romania ===
In Teodorescu's variant, the tree maiden calls the tree Dafinul-verde ("Green Laurel"). She is still seduced by the prince and disguises herself as a monk. Before the prince's wedding with the false bride, he unmasks the tree maiden.

According to Laura Regneala, Teodorescu's tale was translated into French as La Fée du Laurier Vert ("The Fairy of the Green Laurel"), and published by Jules Brun in a 1896 compilation of Romanian fairy tales.

Romanian author Cristea Sandu Timoc collected another Romanian variant with the same name, from a 35-year-old teller named Stani Meila.

von Hahn cited a Wallachian tale from Banat, collected by the Schott brothers, with the title Die Waldjungfrau Wunderschön. In this story, the heroine lives in a bed atop a tree she calls Dafin. She meets a prince and is abandoned by him. She meets a monk on the way and trades clothes with him. The girl from the tree, as a monk, becomes the prince's friend, even after he marries another princess. His father discovers her true nature and hangs her. The prince, seeing that the monk was the girl from the tree, joins her sad fate.

=== Greece ===
According to Richard MacGillivray Dawkins, similar tales may begin with a mother wishing for a bayberry tree child, but, as the story continues, the daughter acts as if she lived in the tree all along - a trait "distinctively Greek", he argued. He also reported a Turkish variant where her abode is a cypress tree, and 7 other texts found in Greece. In another book, Dawkins noted that in "all these Greek" stories, the heroine is not the tree itself, but an inhabitant of the tree.

One of the Greek variants was collected from Iannina by Austrian consul Johann Georg von Hahn, with the title Das Lorbeerkind ("The Laurel Child"). In this tale, a childless mother prays for a child, even if it is a leaf of a laurel tree. She gives birth to a leaf that is washed away and plants itself on the ground, becoming a golden-leaved laurel tree. A prince rests nearby and a maiden comes out of the laurel tree by chanting a command for the tree. She is seduced and abandoned by the prince, and trades her clothes for a dervish's garments and horse. Another Greek variant was collected by William Roger Paton in Mytilene, from Mersini.

=== Turkey ===
In the Typen türkischer Volksmärchen ("Turkish Folktale Catalogue"), by Wolfram Eberhard and Pertev Naili Boratav, both scholars classified a similar narrative as Turkish type TTV 186, "Das Perlenzelt" ("The Pearl Tent"): a heroine for some reason finds a caravan or a retinue, enters the pearly tent and eats its food, then hides; a prince discovers her and spends time with her, but is informed he has to return to marry his intended back at the kingdom, and abandons the heroine; the heroine dons a male disguise as a poor person and meets her beloved, who does not recognize her, and makes cryptic references in verse or song about the tent and her plight; during the prince's wedding, the heroine tries to hang herself, but she is sometimes saved and recognized by the prince. In six of the indexed variants, the heroine is born as a plank of wood when a dervish gives an apple to her parents, or when her childless parents bring home a branch to raise as their child, the heroine appears from it. According to Eberhard, in Turkish variants of the tale type, the girl is the tree, and she cannot return to the tree due the light of the sunrise.

In a Turkish tale collected by Naki Tezel with the title Altın Kozalaklı Gümüş Selvi, translated as The Silver Cypress Tree with Golden Fruit, a poor childless woman takes a piece of wood, carves a likeness of a child and cradles it as if a baby. Her husband thinks her mad, and, after some time, takes the wooden image and throws it out the window. Where the wooden image lands, a cypress tree sprouts. Some time later, a prince and his retinue camp near the tree, and, every night, the prince notices that a silver and a golden candelabra switched positions. He stays awake one night and discovers that a beautiful maiden is the one responsible. She tells him she must not tarry until sunrise, and must return to her mother, the cypress tree. She and the prince talk the nights away, until he tells her he has to go back, and must say goodbye to the girl. On the appointed day, the prince departs before early dawn and leaves the maiden asleep. When she wakes up, it is already dawn, and she tries to return to the tree, but cannot. She wanders off and trades clothes with a shepherd, then goes to the king's court. They become companions, until the prince is set to be married on a certain day. The shepherd then asks the prince to prepare a room with a swinging bed, for he will hang himself. The prince goes to check on the shepherd and realizes "he" was the maiden from the tree. He stops her folly and marries her.

== See also ==
- Lovely Ilonka (maiden coming out of a bulrush)
- The Young Slave
- The Sleeping Prince
- The Myrtle
