= Syrictæ =

Tribe in Greek mythology

The Sciritae (Syrictæ, Syrictae, Sciritai or Skiritai) in medieval bestiaries and Greek mythology were an Indian tribe with snake-like nostrils in place of a nose and bandy serpentine legs.
