= Stuhać =

Demonic creature in Serbian mythology

Stuhać (Serbian: Стухаћ) is a demonic mythical creature in Serbian mythology, recorded in Herzegovina. Though its name is similar to and from the same etymological root as zduhać, there is little similarity between the two mythical beings.

Stuhać lives in high mountains and barren areas; how it looks is not described, however, it is known that it wears clutters made of human ligaments on its legs, so that it would not slip on mountain precipices. If its clutter broke, he would pull ligaments from someone's legs to make new ones.
