= Jarita =

Bird in Sanskrit epic

Jarita (Sanskrit: जरित, IAST Jaritā) was a certain female bird of the species called Sarngika, whose story is told in the Mahabharata. The saint Mandapala, who returned from the shades because he had no son, assumed the form of a male bird, and by her had four sons. He then abandoned her. In the conflagration of the Khandava Forest she showed great devotion to the protection of her children, and they were eventually saved through the influence of Mandapala over the god of fire. Their names were Jaritari, Sarisrikta, Stambamitra, and Drona. They were "interpreters of the Vedas;" and there are hymns of the Rigveda bearing the names of the second and the third.

== Jarita as a tribe in Rigveda ==
Rigveda (X.27.1), (III.15.5), (VIII.100.4) mention about the tribe Jarita (जरित).

असत सु मे जरितः साभिवेगो यत सुन्वते यजमनय शिक्षम |
अनाशीर्दामहमस्मि परहन्ता सत्यध्व्र्तं वर्जिनायन्तमाभुम || Rigveda (X.27.1)

asat su me jaritaḥ sābhivegho yat sunvate yajamanaya śikṣam |
anāśīrdāmahamasmi prahantā satyadhvṛtaṃ vṛjināyantamābhum || Rigveda (X.27.1)

अछिद्रा शर्म जरितः पुरूणि देवानछा दीद्यानः सुमेधाः |
रथो न सस्निरभि वक्षि वाजमगने तवं रोदसीनः सुमेके || Rigveda (III.15.5)

achidrā śarma jaritaḥ purūṇi devānachā dīdyānaḥ sumedhāḥ |
ratho na sasnirabhi vakṣi vājamaghne tvaṃ rodasīnaḥ sumeke ||

अयमस्मि जरितः पश्य मेह विश्वा जातान्यभ्यस्मि मह्ना |
रतस्य मा परदिशो वर्धयन्त्यादर्दिरो भुवना दर्दरीमि || Rigveda (VIII.100.4)

ayamasmi jaritaḥ paśya meha viśvā jātānyabhyasmi mahnā |
ṛtasya mā pradiśo vardhayantyādardiro bhuvanā dardarīmi || Rigveda (VIII.100.4)

== Jarita as a name ==
Jarita as a name refers to an earthen water jug. It is an uncommon name.
