= Spiriduș =

Domestic spirit in Romanian mythology

A spiriduș in Romanian mythology is said to be a "demon incarnate", or a domestic spirit, oftentimes taking the form of an avian familiar, such as hens, crows, or hunting birds. The purpose of these familiars once they're summoned, is to act as messengers or intermediaries between the master of the home in which the spiriduș was born, and the devil. The master can use the spiriduș to request from the devil any mortal desire, in return for their soul in the afterlife.
