= Folklore of Romania =

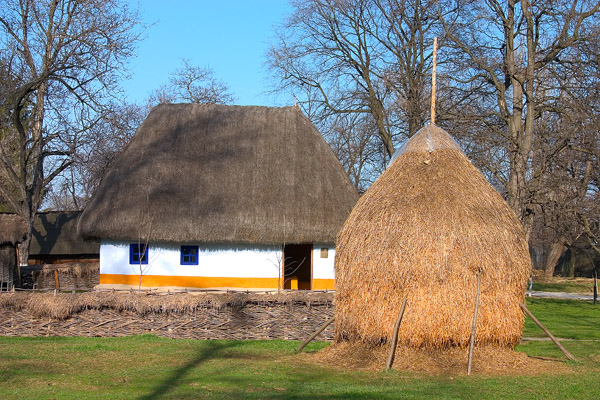
A traditional house in the Village Museum

The folklore of Romania (and of Moldova) is the collection of traditions of the Romanians. A feature of Romanian culture is the special relationship between folklore and the learned culture, determined by two factors. First, the rural character of the Romanian communities resulted in an exceptionally vital and creative traditional culture. Folk creations (the best known is the ballad Miorița) were the main literary genre until the 18^{th} century. They were both a source of inspiration for cultivated creators and a structural model. Second, for a long time learned culture was governed by official and social commands and developed around courts of princes and boyars, as well as in monasteries.

== Overview ==
=== Creation of the world ===
Stories suggest God made the Earth with the help of animals, while the Devil was trying to thwart his plans. In the majority of versions, before the earth existed, a boundless ocean called Apa Sâmbetei was the abode of God and the Devil, seen as master and servant rather than equals. In these stories the Devil goes by the name "Nefârtatul" and is the somewhat foolish brother of God in folk versions of stories. These stories appear not only in Romanian folklore, but also in those of Aromanian, Slavic Macedonian and Bulgarian folklore. Upon deciding to create the Earth, God sent the Devil to bring a handful of clay from the ground of the World Ocean in his holy name. The Devil set forth and tried to bring it to the surface in his name instead, but could not succeed until he brought it up in the name of God. As this piece of clay grew into the Earth, God laid himself down to sleep. The Devil tried to push him over the side, but the ever-expanding Earth would hinder that. After trying to throw God off the Earth in every one of the four cardinal directions, he shied away from the cross he drew in the ground himself.

=== Origin of evil ===
Other accounts, closer to the biblical one, suggest that the Devil and his demons were once angels of God. The Devil, however, tried to rebel, and, in response, God opened up the heavens so that he might fall to the Earth. Fearing that Heaven might be voided, the archangel Michael re-sealed it, thus freezing the demons that had not yet fallen to hell in place. This is related to the concept of soul customs, where every soul is intercepted on its way to heaven by these demons, who force it into hell. It has also given rise to the Romanian saying până ajungi la Dumnezeu, te mănâncă sfinții ("before you reach God, the saints will eat you").

=== Origin of God ===
Another question commonly addressed is that of the origin of God, which is explained in a Russian doll-type fashion; before every god there was another god that created him. Thus explaining the many names the Bible used for God, the Oltenians believed the first god was called Sabaoth, followed by Amon, Apollo, the Creator God of the Bible and, finally, Jesus Christ.

=== The Earth ===
Even after Christian imagery and symbolism became part of Romanian culture, Mother Earth is identified as the consort of God, the heavenly Father.

The origin of mountains is explained in a number of ways by the cultures of the different regions of Romania. One account is that mountains formed as a response to God demanding the Earth to nurture all life, to which the earth shuddered and brought forth mountains. Another version suggests the Earth was too large to fit under the firmament, and so God attempted to shrink it, thus raising mountains. Often, these accounts are accompanied by the imagery of one or several World Pillars, which sustain the earth from below and are usually placed beneath mountains. Earthquakes are frequently attributed to the earth slipping due to the Devil's constant gnawing at these pillars, which are rebuilt by God and his angels in times of fasting.

=== The myth of the Blajini ===
The etymology of the word blajin (adj.) is the Slavonian blažĕnŭ meaning 'kind, well-minding person'. According to Christian calendar, Romanians from Banat, Transylvania, Bucovina and Maramureș counties celebrate Easter of Blajini on first Monday after St. Thomas Sunday. Easter of Blajini is called also Easter of Deaths or Mighty Easter. Romanians, generally, perceived the Earth as a disc, and they imagined what existed on the other side. This other Earth is imagined as a mirror image of the planet, and as a home to creatures called Blajini [blaˈʒinʲ] ("gentle/kind-hearted ones"), sometimes given the name Rohmani [ˈroh.manʲ] in Bucovina. They are described as anthropomorphic and short, sometimes having the head of a rat. They are either described as malicious, or as having great respect for God and leading a sinless life. They are considered to fast the year through, and thus doing humans a great service.

The Romanian holiday Paștele Blajinilor (Easter of Blajini) is a way to repay them for the benefits they bring. Since they live in isolation, they have no way of knowing when Easter comes. It is for this reason that Romanians eat dyed eggs and let the shells flow downstream, from there they believe they will get to the Apa Sâmbetei, and from there to the Blajini. Blajini are invisible connectors between Inner and Hollow Earth.

Blajin also means a dead child who did not receive the benediction of Holy Spirit. The ethnograph Marian Simion Florea wrote : Blajini are fictitious beings, incarnations of dead children not baptized, who live at the end of Earth, nearby The Holy water (of Saturday). Some explain them as the descendants of Seth, Adam's son. Others think that they used to live alongside humans on the earth, but Moses, seeing his people oppressed by them, split the waters and, after he and his people had retreated to safety, poured the waters back onto them, sending them to their current abode.

For celebrating the souls of dead relatives or friends, Romanians from above mentioned counties prepare festive meals and offer them, in the cemetery, nearby the tombs, after the religious mass and benediction, to all who wished to commemorate and pay their respects to the dead. They cheer up in memory of the deceased.

=== Eschatology ===
The most prominent symbol associated with the End Times is that of the earthquake. Waters overflowing and mountains collapsing are both linked to these earthquakes, which are mainly caused by lack of faith, which accelerates the crumbling of the World Pillars. Others attribute the earthquakes to the Earth (which is alive, and can therefore feel) realising the wicked ways of humans, and trembling in fright. Other rare natural phenomena such as Eclipses or Comets were seen as a sign of impending doom.

If these warnings should fail, God will initiate the End of the World. Such imagery as a darkened Sun, a bleeding Moon and falling stars are associated with the beginning of the End Times. Three saints (usually in the persons of Enoch, John and Elijah) are said to come to Earth to unveil the Devil's attempts to destroy the world, whereupon they shall be killed by decapitation. The sky and the Earth will be set alight and the Earth will be purged, so that its Creator may descend upon it. The 12 winds are said to sweep up the ashes of people and gather them in the valley of Safed, where the Last Judgement shall be done.

Sources form Moldova and Bucovina also speak of a great army led by the emperor Constantine, which will conquer all the world's states, and kill everyone, save for a few pure ones, which will then repopulate the Earth. In another instance, should this army not come, God shall burn the earth as described and bring the Blajini to live there. In another version, true to the succession of gods mentioned earlier (s. here), Jesus Christ is said to come and create a new world, like his father before him. A not-so-widespread belief is that of a definitive destruction of the earth, whereupon God and the Devil shall divide the souls of the dead among themselves and retire to the Moon, who is considered to have been made in the image of the Earth to serve a place of retreat after the destruction of the Earth.

== Characteristics ==
Strong folk traditions have survived to this day due to the rural character of the Romanian communities, which has resulted in an exceptionally vital and creative traditional culture. Romania's rich folk traditions have been nourished by many sources, some of which predate the Roman occupation. Traditional folk arts include wood carving, ceramics, weaving and embroidery of costumes, household decorations, dance, and richly varied folk music. Ethnographers have tried to collect in the last two centuries as many elements as possible: the Museum of the Romanian Peasant and the Romanian Academy are currently the main institutions which systematically organise the data and continue the research.

Wood used to be the main construction material, and heavily ornamented wooden objects were common in old houses. In Maramureș, wood was used to create impressive structures such as churches or gates; in Dobruja, windmills were made of wood, and in mountainous regions hardwood was used even for covering the roof. To preserve traditional houses, many village museums have been created in the last century throughout Romania, such as the Village Museum in Bucharest, the Traditional Popular Civilisation ASTRA Museum in Sibiu or the Oltenian Village Museum in Râmnicu Vâlcea.

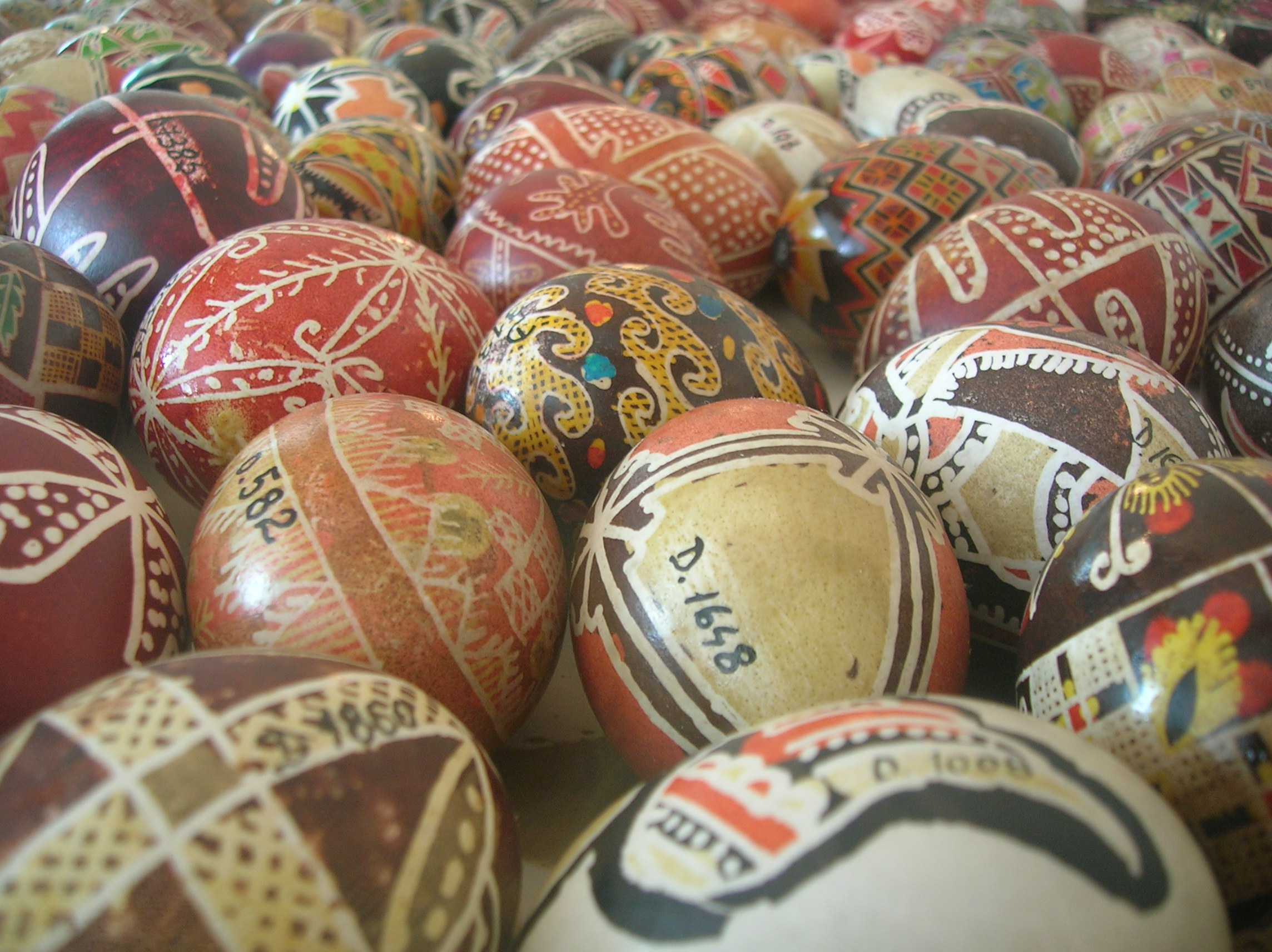

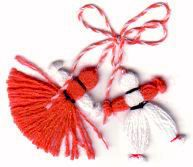

Linen was the most common material for clothing, combined with wool during the winter or colder periods. These are embroidered with traditional motifs that vary from region to region. Black is the most common colour used, but red and blue are predominant in certain areas. Traditionally, men wore a white shirt and pants (if made of wool they are called ițari) with a wide leather belt, usually over the shirt, and a vest sometimes made of leather and embroidered. They wore either boots or a simple shoe made of leather and tied around the foot called opincă and they wore a hat which differs in design from region to region. Women also wore a white skirt and a shirt with a vest. They wore an apron called șorț or cătrință which is also embroidered and a headscarf called basma; on special occasions they wore more elaborate outfits.

Music and dance represent a part of the Romanian folklore and there are a great variety of musical genres and dances. Party music shows both Balkan and Hungarian influences. Sentimental music, however, is the most valued, and Romanians consider their doina (a sad song either about one's home or about love, composed like an epic ballad) unique in the world. Maria Tănase is considered to be one of the greatest Romanian folk singers and today Grigore Leșe and Taraful Haiducilor are two of the most famous musicians. The dances are lively and are practiced throughout Romania by a large number of professional and amateur groups, thus keeping the tradition alive; Hora is one of the most famous group dances but men's folk dances such as călușari are extremely complex and have been declared by UNESCO to be "Masterpieces of the Oral and Intangible Heritages of Humanity".

Romanians have had, from time immemorial, a myriad of customs, tales and poems about love, faith, kings, princesses, and witches. Ethnologists, poets, writers and historians have tried in recent centuries to collect and to preserve tales, poems, ballads and have tried to describe as well as possible the customs and habits related to different events and times of year. Customs related to certain times of year are: the colinde – Romanian Christmas carols, sorcova on New Year's Eve or the Mărțișor custom on 1 March, marking the spring. Other customs are presumably of pre-Christian pagan origin, like the Paparuda rain enchanting custom in the summer, or the masked folk theatre or Ursul (the bear) and Capra (the goat) in winter.

The novelist and storyteller Ion Creangă, was successful in collecting folk tales and he shaped stories like Harap Alb (roughly, "The White Moor") and Fata babei și fata moșului ("The old woman's daughter and the old man's daughter") into theform which is now known. Also, the poet Vasile Alecsandri published a popular version of the ballad Miorița (The Little Ewe), an emotional, philosophical poem, centered around a simple subject: the plot by two shepherds to kill a third shepherd because they envied his wealth. Another prolific editor of folk tales was Petre Ispirescu, who in the 19th century published several volumes containing multiple short novels and tales from popular mythology. They are centered on well-known characters from folk tales like the prince Făt-Frumos (aka the Romanian "Prince Charming"), the princess Ileana Cosânzeana, the villain or monster Zmeu or Căpcăun, the dragon Balaur or the fantastical creatures with surnatural powers like the good Zână and the evil Muma Pădurii.

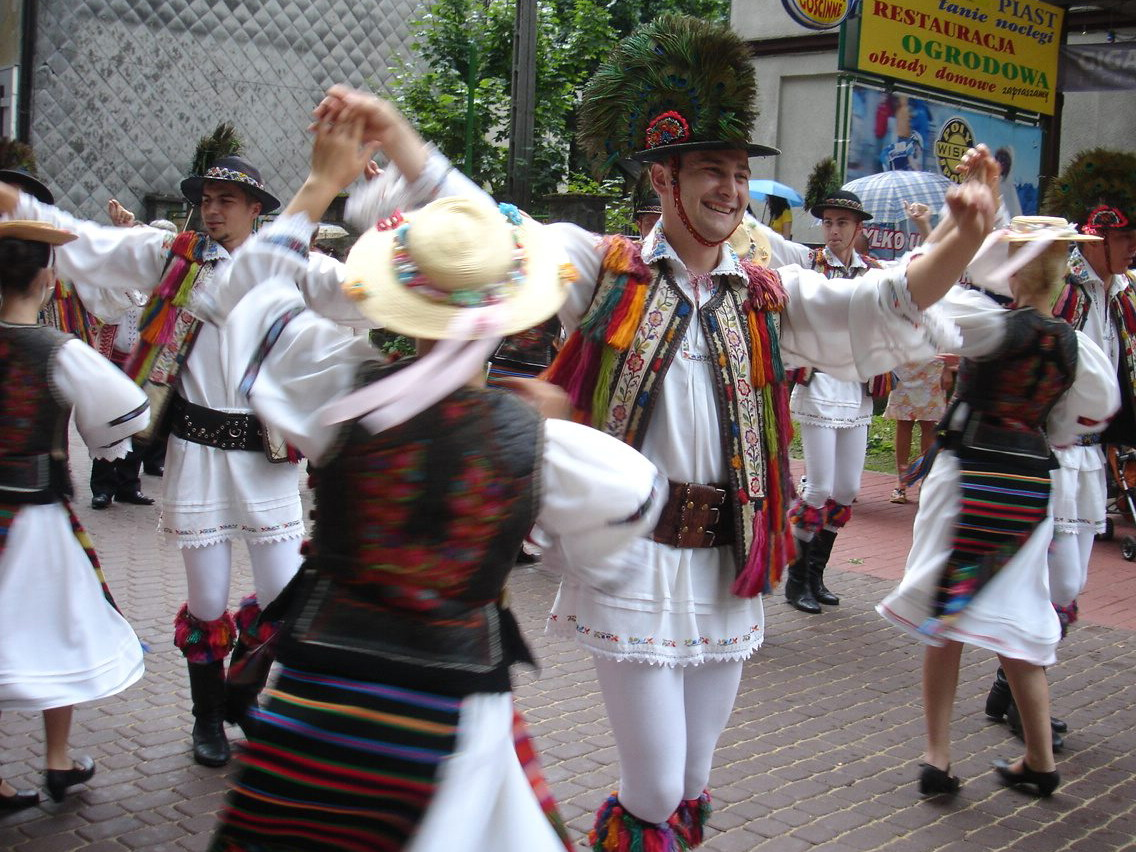
Transilvania Romanian folk group, in Cluj Napoca, in original Romanian folk-costumes from Bistrița-Năsăud area. 2008

=== Places ===
- Apa Sâmbetei
- Apa Vie/Apa Moartă
- Sorbul Pământului
- Tărâmul Celălalt (Hollow Earth, direct translation: The other Realm)

=== Folk tales ===
- Miorița
- Meșterul Manole
- Babele
- Verea Viteazul
- Scholomance

=== Musical poems ===
- When the shepherd lost his sheep
- The Story of Tânjală (Povestea lui Tânjală)

=== Romanian myths part of international culture ===
- Vampire - See strigoi and moroi, which are more phantom – or wizard-like creatures.
- Werewolf (vârcolac)
- Șobolan - A giant rat similar to the South American capybara. Rural Romanian folklore tends to attribute the șobolan human characteristics.
- Solomonar - See Hultan and Solomonari, who were a group of nobles and wizards, made famous more by their families' high social status, than for their deeds. However, this is mainly due to the massive crusades of Christianity and the attempt to destroy all the historic tradition of these Wizards. Some of these are Dracula Vlad, Solomon and Despina the Impure.

Most of these names can be found in the Romanian Lore in reference to vampires and dragons.

=== Rituals ===
- Dragobete (Romanian folklore similar to Valentine's Day)
- Caloian
- Paparuda
- Star boys' singing procession
- Nunta mortului

=== Fairy tales ===
- "The Boys with the Golden Stars"
- "The 12 Sisters and the Demon Bride"
- "Seventh son of a seventh son"
- "Let Thee Be Marked in Magic"
- "Harap Alb's story"
- "Greuceanu"
- "Youth Without Aging and Life Without Death"
- "Trandafiru"
- "Enchanted Balaur"
- "The Three Golden Pomegranates"

== Characters in folk literature ==
- Baba Cloanța (similar to Muma Pădurii)
- Baba Dochia
- Calul năzdrăvan (similar to Pegasus, direct translation: The Marvellous Horse)
- Cățelul Pământului
- Cotoroanță (similar to Muma Pădurii)
- Craiul (the king)
- Fata Pădurii
- Faurul Pământului (The Blacksmith of the Earth)
- Ileana Cosânzeana
- Împăratul (the emperor)
- Luceafăr - similar to Planet Venus
- Marțolea (Demon of Tuesday)
- Michiduță (the devil)
- Moșul (the old man)
- Muma Pădurii
- Murgilă
- Rohmani (or Blajini)
- Samca
- Scaraoțchi (the devil)
- Sfânta Duminică
- Sfânta Miercuri
- Sfântu' Petru (Saint Peter)
- Sfânta Sâmbătă
- Sfânta Vineri
- Solomonari
- Statu-Palmă-Barbă-Cot (The one who rests his chin on his palm while using his elbow)
- Ucigă-l-toaca (the devil)
- Uniilă (a devil)
- Ursitoare - similar to the Fates
- Vâlva
- Zburător
- Zorilă

=== Heroes ===
- Ber-Căciulă
- Doamna Neaga
- Dumnezeu (God)
- Făt-Frumos
- Ileana Cosânzeana
- Greuceanu
- Harap Alb (The White Arab)
- Iovan Iorgovan
- Ler Împărat - in remembrance of Flavius Valerius Constantinus, the Roman emperor
- Baba Novac
- Păcală
- Prâslea cel voinic (Prâslea the Sturdy)

=== Creatures ===
- Balaur (giant dragon with seven heads)
- Baubau, variant form Babau (similar to the Bogeyman)
- Căpcăun (an ogre)
- Corcoaia (similar to Lernaean Hydra)
- Dragon
- Iele
- Moroi (a type of vampire)
- Nemorți (similar to zombi)
- Pasărea măiastră (the magic bird)
- Pricolici (a werewolf or demon)
- Sântoaderi
- Sânziana (or Drăgaică)
- Scorpie (Chimera)
- Spiriduș (a sprite)
- Stafie - similar to ghost
- Strigoi (a vampire or zombie)
- Uriaș - similar to Giant
- Vasilisc - similar to Basilisk
- Vântoase (spirits of the wind)
- Vârcolac (werewolf)
- Zână (fairy)
- Zburător (similar to an incubus)
- Zgripțor (similar to Griffin)
- Zmeu

== List of folk dances ==
- Bătute
- Brâul (Sesh dance)
- Buciumeana (hornpipe dance)
- Călușari (Călus, Călușul)
- Ciuleandra
- Hora (a circle dance)
- Geamparale
- Joc
- Joc cu bâta (Jocul cu bâta) - Game with stick
- Mărunțel
- Perinița, translated as "Little pillow", a dance of wedding traditions, a.k.a. Handkerchief Joc
- Pe loc ("On Spot", a stomping dance)
- Poarga românescă (Romanian polka)
- Sârba
- Tropotițe

=== Banat plain ===
- Sorocul de la Beregsăul Mare
- Sorocul de la Jebel
- Pe loc ca la Murava
- Pe loc a lui lefta Lupu
- Întoarsa

=== Banat mountain ===
- Brîu Bătrîn
- Ardeleana de la Rugi
- Ardeleana "Baba Peleaga"
- Ardeleana ca pe Valea Almajului
- Doiul roata de la Glimboca
- De doi ca la Caransebeș

=== Moldova ===
- Arnăutul
- Haiduceasca
- Jocul fierarilor ("The blacksmiths' dance")
- Bătrânesca din Bucovina
- Arcanul
- Arcanul Bătrânesc
- Bătuta
- Hora Câmpulungului
- Hora de la Munte
- Rața
- Hora miresei (translated as "The bride's reel")
- Bătuta de la Tudora
- Bătuta de la Vorona

=== Oltenia ===
- Alunelul de la Goicea
- Sârba Călușerească
- Sârba Oltenească
- Trei Păzește de la Bistreț
- Trei Păzește de la Dolj
- Bobocica
- Boiereasca
- Alunelul
- Briuletul
- Hora mare
- Galaonul

=== Bihor ===
- Polca
- Pe picior

=== Năsăud ===
- De-a lungul
- Barbuncul
- Învârtita (a Romanian-style square dance, done mainly throughout the Romanian Transylvania region, which also includes Năsăud.)

=== Transylvania ===
- Crihalma
- Fecioreasca
- De-a Lungul
- Joc în Patru
- Oaș Dance
- Sârba "Sita Buzălilui"

== See also ==
- Romanian traditional music

== See also ==
- Christmas in Romania
- Culture of Romania
- Religion in Romania
