= Skrzak =

Polish and Slavic household spirit

The skrzak is a household spirit in Polish and Wendish mythology. It dwells beneath the hearth and performs household chores and protects the home, however after its master dies, the skrzak will take their soul.

== In popular culture ==
- In the fantasy fiction anthology City of the Gods - Starybogow: Whispers in the Dark the skrzak is depicted as a little purplish-black flying imp. Within the anthology's setting, earthquakes had released both Eldar Gods and Slavic Deities from the Void. This left many underground labyrinthine mazes which skrzak are said to inhabit. In additional to fangs and claw, the skrzak are given maniacal laughter that induces madness. Prior to August 1, 2022, this article's the description of skrzak came directly from this fantasy fiction anthology without sourcing or reference.

== See also ==
- Krasnoludek (also known as skrzat)
