= Muma Pădurii =

Mythological figure

In Romanian folklore, Muma Pădurii (Romanian pronunciation: [ˈmuma pəˈdurij]) is an ugly and mischievous or mad old woman living in the forest (in the heart of virgin forests, in a hut/cabin, or an old tree). She is the opposite of fairies such as Zână. She is also the protector of the animals and plants, brewing potions and helping injured animals. She cures the forest if it is dying and she keeps unwanted trespassers away by driving them mad and scaring them.

She can be associated with witches (like the witch from the story of "Hansel and Gretel"), but she is a neutral "creature", harming only those who harm the forest.

== Etymology ==
Muma Pădurii literally means "mother of the forest", though "mumă" is an archaic version of "mamă" (mother), which has a fairy tale overtone for the Romanian reader (somewhat analogous to using the archaic pronouns like "thou" and "thy" in English). A few other words, typically protagonists of folktales, have this effect.

== Characteristics ==
Muma Pădurii is a spirit of the forest in a very ugly and old woman's body. Sometimes she has the ability to change her shape. She lives in a dark, dreadful, hidden little house.

She is thought to attack children and because of this a large variety of spells (descântece in Romanian) are used against her.

This (step-) mother of the forest kidnaps little children and enslaves them. In one popular story, at some point, she tries to boil a little girl alive in a soup. However the little girl's brother outsmarts Muma Pădurii and pushes the woman-monster in the oven instead, similar to the story of Hansel and Gretel. The story ends on a happy note when all kids are free to go back to their parents.

== In modern culture ==
Instead of saying "She's ugly", Romanians sometimes say "She looks like Muma Pădurii".

== See also ==
- Baba Yaga
- Black Annis
- Boo Hag
- Crone
- Culture of Romania
- Hag
- Mother Nature
- Nocnitsa
- Onibaba (folklore)
- Religion in Romania
- The Witch (fairy tale)
- Coraline - The Beldam is often based on the Muma Padurii
