= Struthopodes =

Legendary humanoid creatures in Medieval bestiaries

The Struthopodes in Medieval bestiaries were a race of humanoids whose males had enormous feet, but whose females had tiny feet.
