= Enichioi =

- Commune
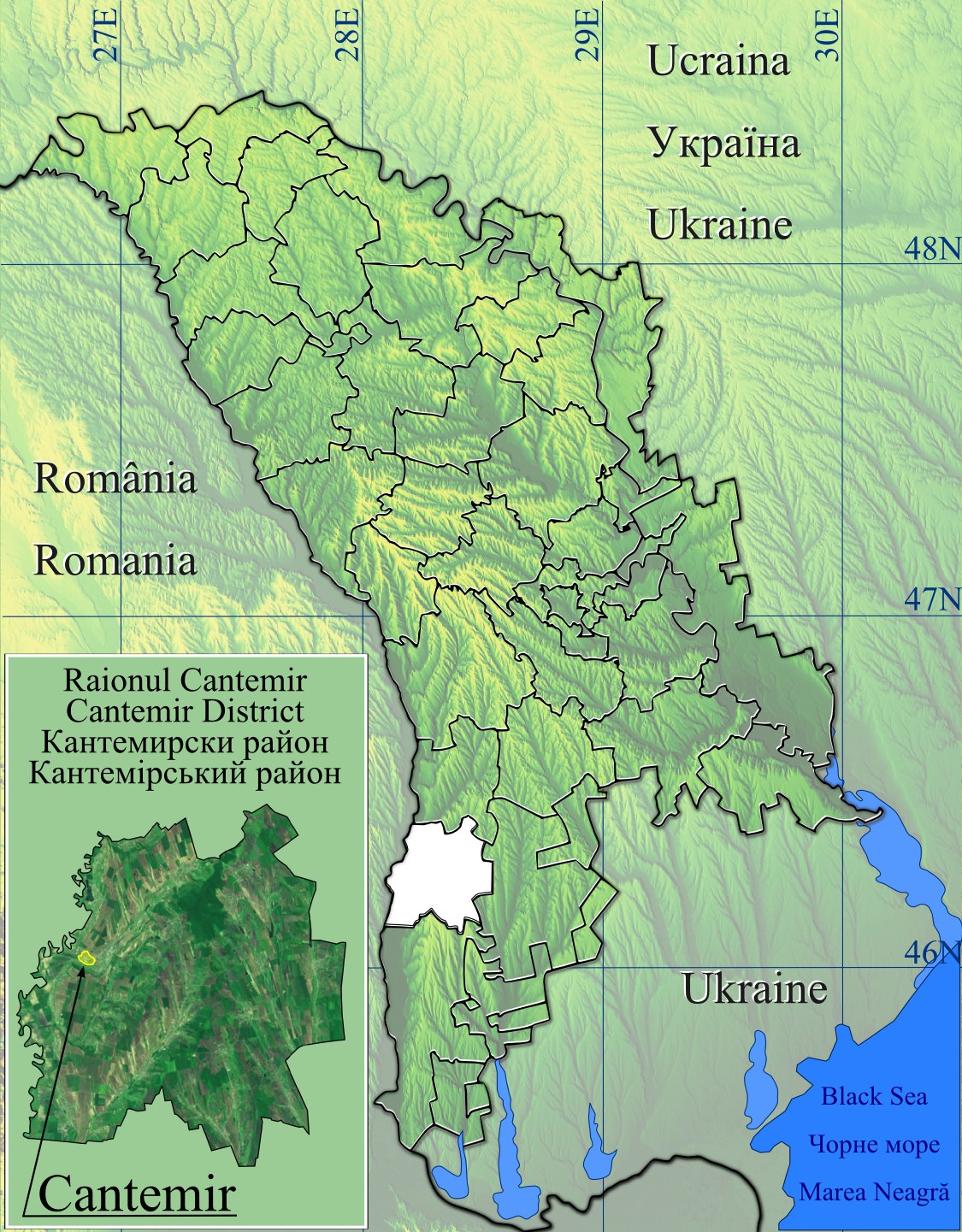
- Location within Cantemir
- Coordinates: 46°13′11″N 28°25′7″E
- Country: Moldova
- District: Cantemir District

Government
  - Mayor: Vladimir dutcã PSRM, comunist, 2037 PNL
- Elevation: 115 m (377 ft)

Population (2014)
  - Total: 1,776
- Time zone: UTC+2 (EET)
  - Summer (DST): UTC+3 (EEST)
- Postal code: MD-7324

Enichioi is a commune in Cantemir District, Moldova. It is composed of four villages: Bobocica, Enichioi, Floricica and Țolica.
