= Călușari =

Participants in a traditional Romanian dance

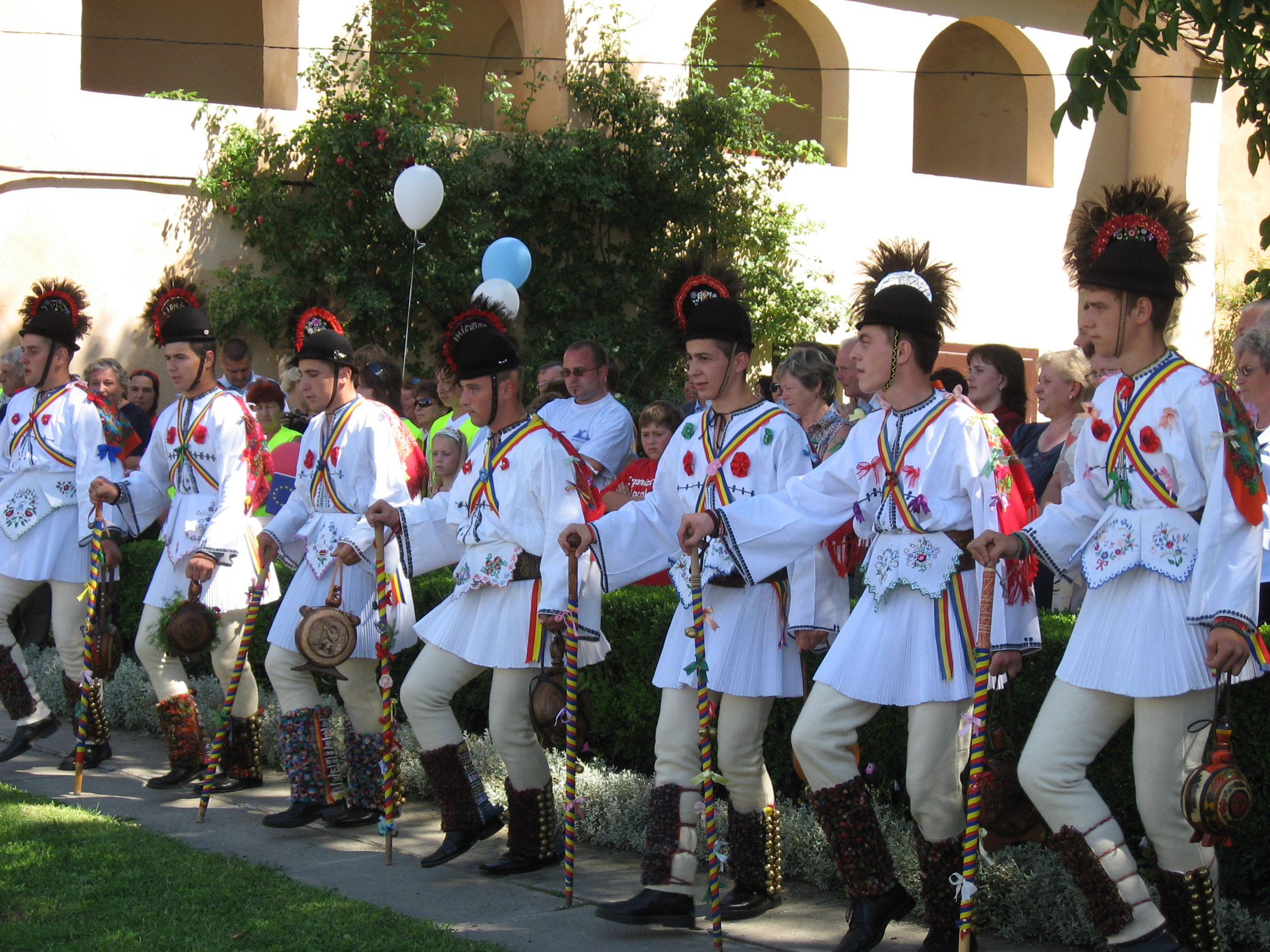
- Dancers dressed in the călușari style
- Genre: Traditional
- Origin: Romania

Căluş ritual
- UNESCO Intangible Cultural Heritage
- Country: Romania
- Reference: 00090
- Region: Europe and North America

Inscription history
- Inscription: 2008 (3rd session)
- List: Representative

The Călușari (Romanian: Călușarii, Romanian pronunciation: [kəluˈʃarʲ]; singular: Călușar) are the participants to an old traditional Romanian dance known as the căluș. From three weeks after Easter until Pentecost, called Rusalii in Romanian, for around two weeks they have traditionally travelled to all their local communities where they would dance, accompanied by a few fiddlers.

== History ==
The origins of the Călușari are unknown, although the first written attestations are from the 17th-century musical notations of Ioan Căianu.

Romanian historian of religion Mircea Eliade noted that "Although the oath taken is made in the name of God, the mythico-ritual scenario enacted by the calusari has nothing in common with Christianity" and that, in the 19th century at least, there was clerical opposition to the group, with its members being excluded from taking communion for three years in some regions.

== Etymology ==
The generally accepted derivation of Căluș is from the old Latin double form "collusium, collusii", meaning both "a dance group" and "a secret society", however other derivations have been proposed. The Romanian word căluș also means "a small piece of wood placed in the mouth to prevent talking", and derivation from this word has some support from the presence of the mute figure in some groups, and the ritual silence that used to be observed by the entire group. Others, such as Mircea Eliade, see căluș as a diminutive of cal "horse", in turn derived from the Latin caballus, and point to the horse's mythical associations with fertility and war, as well as the imitation of horses found in certain Căluș dances (although these dances do not currently play a principal role in the ritual).

Kligman (1977) remarks: "Extensive scholarship has been devoted to proving 'at any price a pure Roman origin' of this beloved ritual. [T]he results are far from persuasive." One such theory is that it derives from "Coli-Salii" — that is, the Salii Collini mentioned by Livy — these being Roman priests dedicated to the worship of Mars.

== Description ==
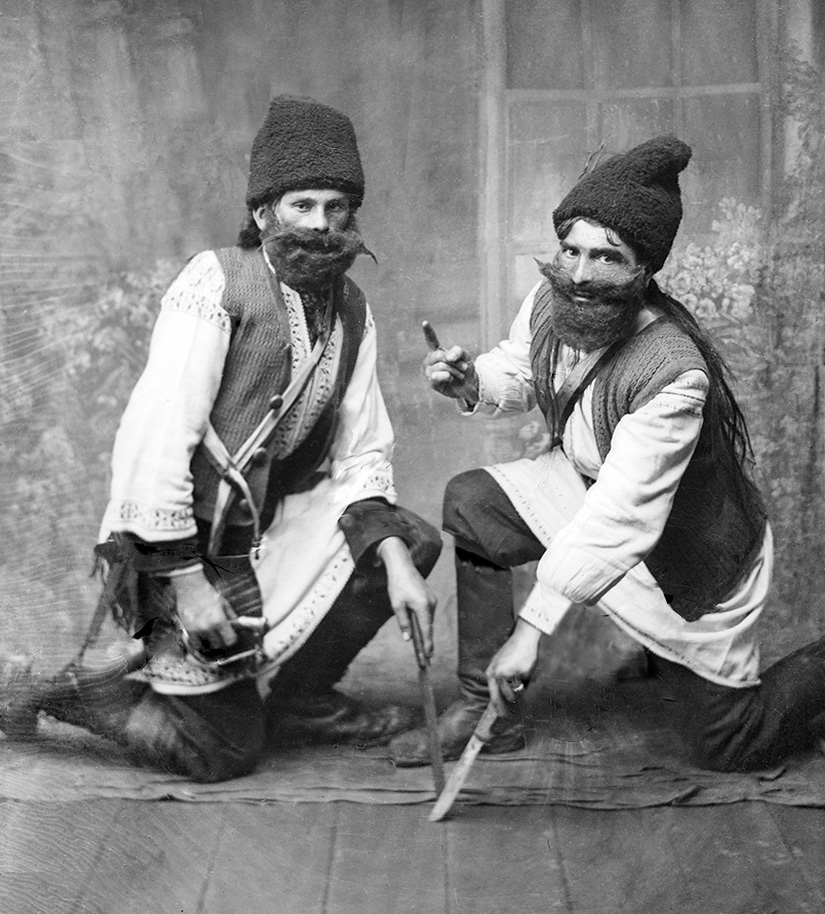
Two Călușari, photographed by Costică Acsinte, c. 1930–1940

Traditionally, the Călușari group is a secret, male-only society associated with a spring rite, possibly a remnant of tribal warrior societies. The group leader (usually an older man) recruits a number of acolytes, always young, single adults chosen for physical prowess. The group members take an oath of secrecy, whereupon they participate in an initiation rite and taught the forms of the dance. The groups of Călușari roam the country in spring-time, visiting villages by turns and taking part in the week-end dances – hora.

=== Căluș dance ===
The căluș is a male group dance, although there are records of traditions from Oltenia region that included 1–2 young girls, now obsolete. A "bride" would be chosen by the group from each village they passed through, based on her dancing skills. The "bride" would be oath-bound to join in the ritual dance, for three years in a row.

Dancers wear white trousers and white tunics, with brightly coloured ribbons streaming from their hats. Bells are attached to their ankles, and dances include the use of ornate sticks held upright whilst dancing, or pointing at the ground as a prop. The dance itself is highly acrobatic, emphasizing extension and high jumps, much like the Ceili dance.

Like many Morris dances, in many traditions Călușari dancers include a fool, known as the "nebun", or "crazy".

The dance includes the following elements:

- The starting figure of walking (plimbări), or a basic step, in a circle moving counter clockwise.
- More complex figures (mișcare) performed in place between walking steps.
- Figures are formed from combinations of elements, often have a beginning-middle-end structure.

=== Association with fairies ===
According to the Romanian historian Mircea Eliade, the Călușari were known for "their ability to create the impression of flying in the air" which he believed represented both the galloping of a horse and the dancing of the fairies (zâne). Indeed, the group's patron was the "Queen of the Fairies" (Doamna Zânelor), who was also known as Irodiada and Arada, and who Eliade connected with the folkloric figure Diana. The Călușari were believed to be able to cure the victims of fairies.

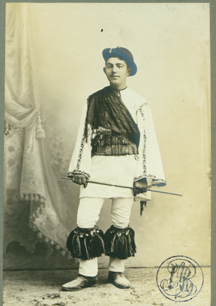
Căluşari dancer holding a sword c. 1920

=== Military elements ===
In their dance, the Călușari carried clubs and a sword, as well as a flag and a wooden horsehead. They swore on the group's flag to treat each other as brothers, to respect the customs of the Călușari and to remain chaste for the next nine days. Upon their return home, their flag was fixed into the ground, with one member climbing it and crying out "war, dear ones, war!".

== Similar dances ==
Other male group dances originating from ritual dances are found along the Carpathians and in Transylvania. The Carpathian variants such as Trilișești and Țânțăroiul from Moldavia and Bărbătescul and De sărit from Maramureș include only the most basic features whereas the De bâtă, Haidău, and Fecioreasca of Transylvania are very close to the Călușari with the addition of more complex later developments.

The English Morris dance is also similar in choreography, the meaning of the ritualistic sword dance, and the costumes. It could simply be a common European folk dance, hence its connections with common folk beliefs such as fairies.

== See also ==
- Green week
- Hobby horse
- Weapon dance
- Sântoaderi
