= Zână =

Creature in Romanian mythology

Zână (plural zâne; zînă and zîne, d̦ână and d̦âne in old spellings) is the Romanian equivalent of the Greek Charites or the fairy godmother. They are the opposite of monsters such as Muma Pădurii. These characters make positive appearances in fairy tales and mostly reside in the woods. They can also be considered the Romanian equivalent of fairies and the Germanic elf. They vary in size and appearance and can transform to blend into their surroundings for protection and cover. They can appear openly in the woods and coax travelers to follow them in order to help them find their way. They can also hide in the woods and quietly guide those who need help through signs and "breadcrumbs" through the forest.

== Mythological role ==
They give life to fetuses in utero and bestow upon them great gifts like the art of dancing, beauty, kindness, and luck. In folk tales, it is told not to upset them because they also have the power to do bad things or put a curse on the wrongdoer. They also act like guardian angels, especially for children who enter the woods or other good people.

== Etymology ==
The word zână comes from the Roman goddess Diana (as does Astur-Leonese xana). She is the one who has all the beauty, and is the one that gives it away.

== In culture ==
Zână is also used in current Romanian slang to refer to an attractive girl.

== See also ==
- Xana
- Zana
- Sântoaderi
