= Aileen =

- Gender: Female

Other names
- Related names: Eileen, Eibhlín, Eilín

Aileen is an Irish feminine given name, a variant of Eileen.

Notable people with this name include:

- Aileen Adams (born 1923), British consultant anaesthetist
- Aileen Allen (1888–1950), American diver
- Aileen Armitage (born 1930), British writer and author
- Aileen Baviera (1959–2020), Filipino political scientist and sinologist
- Aileen Bernal (born 1994), Panamanian model and beauty pageant contestant winner
- Aileen Britton (1916–1986), Australian actress
- Aileen Bryan (1925–2005), American sailor
- Aileen Campbell (born 1980), Scottish politician
- Aileen Cannon (born 1981), American lawyer and federal judge
- Aileen Carroll (1944–2020), Canadian politician
- Aileen Christianson (1944–2020), English lecturer
- Aileen Convery (born 1969), Irish swimmer
- Aileen H. Cowan (1926–2024), Canadian painter and sculptor
- Aileen Crowley (born 1994), Irish rower
- Aileen Dent (1890–1978), Australian artist
- Aileen Despard (1908–1981), Irish actress
- Aileen Donnelly, Irish judge
- Aileen Eagleton (1902–1984), British painter and wood engraver
- Aileen Eaton (1909–1987), American boxing and wrestling promoter
- Aileen Mary Elliott (1896–1966), British artist
- Aileen Fisher (1906–2002), American writer, poet and children's author
- Aileen Fox (1907–2005), English archaeologist
- Aileen Frisch (born 1992), South Korean-Slovenian luger
- Aileen Fyfe, British historian
- Aileen Galvin (born 1968), Scottish cricketer
- Aileen Garmson (1863–1951), New Zealand trade unionist and political activist
- Aileen Geving (born 1987), American curler
- Aileen Gilroy (born 1993), Australian rules footballer
- Aileen de Graaf (born 1990), Dutch darts player
- Aileen Griffiths (1918–2007), Australian community worker
- Aileen Gunther (born 1954), American state politician and nurse
- Aileen Hamilton (1902–1993), English and American screenwriter, actress, singer and costume designer
- Aileen Hernandez (1926–2017), American union organizer and civil right activist
- Aileen Keel (born 1952), Scottish medical doctor and academic
- Aileen S. Kraditor (1928–2020), American historian
- Aileen Kuhn (born 2003), German hammer thrower
- Aileen Lee (born 1970), American businesswoman
- Aileen Elizabeth Lynch (1898–1983), Australian public servant and politician
- Aileen MacDonald, Australian politician
- Aileen MacKeogh (1952–2005), Irish sculptor and academic
- Aileen Manning (1886–1946), American actress
- Aileen Marson (1912–1939), British actress
- Aileen Marty, Cuban-born American doctor, infectious disease expert, pathologist and academic
- Aileen McColgan, British barrister and academic
- Aileen McCorkell (1921–2010), British businesswoman
- Aileen McGlynn (born 1973), Scottish Paralympic cyclist
- Aileen McLeod (born 1971), Scottish politician
- Aileen Meagher (1910–1987), Canadian relay runner
- Aileen Mehle (1918–2016), American columnist
- Aileen Mills (born 1962), English track and field athlete
- Aileen Morales (born 1987), American softball coach
- Aileen Moreton-Robinson (born 1956), Australian academic, feminist, author and activist
- Aileen Morrison (born 1982), Irish triathlete
- Aileen Neilson (born 1971), Scottish wheelchair curler
- Aileen Noonan (born 1950), Irish chess player
- Aileen O'Brien (1913–2000), American writer, journalist, and political activist
- Aileen O'Toole, Irish former journalist, newspaper founder and consultant
- Aileen Osofsky (1926–2010), American community leader, philanthropist and bridge player
- Aileen Palmer (1915–1988), British-Australian poet and diarist
- Aileen Passloff (1931–2020), American dancer and teacher
- Aileen Paterson (1934–2018), Scottish writer and illustrator
- Aileen Pippett (1895–1974), British journalist and biographer
- Aileen Plant (died 2007), Australian expert in infectious diseases
- Aileen Plunket (1904–1999), Anglo-Irish hostess
- Aileen Preston (1889–1974), Irish chauffeur and suffragette
- Aileen Pringle (1895–1989), American actress
- Aileen Quinn (born 1971), American actress
- Aileen Raymond (1910–2005), English television and stage actress
- Aileen Ribeiro, English historian
- Aileen Richards, Welsh businesswoman
- Aileen Riggin (1906–2002), American swimmer and diver
- Aileen Roberts, 2nd Countess Roberts (1870–1944), British noblewoman
- Aileen B. Ryan (1912–1987), American politician
- Aileen Shaw (born 1945), Australian figure skater
- Aileen Stace (1895–1977), New Zealand craftswoman, spinnerand spinning teacher
- Aileen Stanley (1893–1982), American singer
- Aileen Cole Stewart (1893–1997), African-American United States Army nurse
- Aileen Tan (born 1966), Singaporean actress
- Aileen Thomas (1907–1989), Canadian fencer
- Aileen Ward (1919–2016), American professor
- Aileen Osborn Webb (1892–1979), American aristocrat and crafter
- Aileen Whelan (born 1991), English footballer
- Aileen Williams (1924–2015), Canadian activist
- Aileen Wilson (born 1984), British high jumper
- Aileen Wuornos (1956–2002), American serial killer, robber and prostitute
- Aileen Yingst, American geologist and scientist

== See also ==
- Aleen Cust (1868–1937), Anglo-Irish veterinary surgeon, first female veterinary surgeon to be recognised by the Royal College of Veterinary Surgeons
