= Eileen =

Eileen (/aɪˈliːn/ eye-LEEN or /ˈaɪliːn/ EYE-leen) is an Irish feminine given name anglicised from Eibhlín, an Irish form of the Norman French name Aveline, which is derived from the Germanic Avi, possibly meaning desire in combination with the diminutive suffix el and -in. It is related to the English name Evelyn and the variant name Aileen. It has been featured in classic Irish songs.

It may refer to:

== People ==
=== Artists ===
- Eileen Agar (1899–1991), British Surrealist painter and photographer
- Eileen Andjelkovitch (1896–1941), British violinist
- Eileen Fisher (born 1951), clothing retailer and designer
- Eileen Folson (1956–2007), Broadway composer
- Eileen Ford (1922–2014), American model agency executive
- Eileen Gray (1878–1976), Irish furniture designer and architect
- Eileen Hazell (1903–1984), Canadian sculptor and potter
- Eileen Ramsay (1915–2017), British maritime photographer
- Eileen Shields (born 1970), American footwear designer and entrepreneur

=== Entertainers ===
- Eileen (singer) (born 1941), American-born singer in France
- Eileen Atkins (born 1934), English actress
- Eileen Barton (1924–2006), American singer
- Eileen Bellomo, member of rock group The Stilettos
- Eileen Bowman (born 1966), American actress
- Eileen April Boylan (born 1987), Filipina/Irish-American actress
- Eileen Brennan (1932–2013), American actress
- Eileen Catterson, Scottish fashion model and former Miss Scotland
- Eileen Daly (born 1963), English actress, singer and director
- Eileen Davidson (born 1959), American film actress
- Eileen Derbyshire (born 1930), English character actress
- Eileen DeSandre, American actress
- Eileen Essell (1922–2015), Irish actress
- Eileen Farrell (1920–2002), American opera and concert singer
- Eileen Fulton (1933–2025), American actress
- Eileen Heckart (1919–2001), American actress
- Eileen Helsby (born 1937), British actress
- Eileen Herlie (1918–2008), Scottish-American actress
- Eileen Ivers (born 1965), Irish-American musician
- Eileen Joyce (1908–1991), Australian pianist
- Eileen McCallum (born 1936), Scottish actress
- Eileen O'Brien (actress), English actress
- Eileen Pollock (1947–2020), Northern Ireland actress
- Eileen Rodgers (1930–2003), American singer and Broadway performer
- Eileen Rose (born 1965), American singer/songwriter
- Eileen Ryan (1927–2022), American actress
- Eileen Sedgwick (1898–1991), American silent film actress
- Eileen Walsh (born 1977), Irish actress
- Eileen Way (1911–1994), English actress
- Eileen Whitfield, Canadian journalist and playwright
- Eileen Wilson (1923–2018), American television star
- Eileen Yeow (born 1972), Singaporean actress

=== Politicians ===
- Eileen Anderson (1928–2021), Hawaii politician
- Eileen Bell (born 1943), Northern Ireland politician
- Eileen Desmond (1932–2005), British politician
- Eileen C. Dugan (1945–1996), New York politician
- Eileen Ehlers, New Hampshire politician
- Eileen Flockhart (born 1944), American politician
- Eileen Gordon (born 1946), United Kingdom politician
- Eileen Hickey (New York politician) (1945–1999), New York politician
- Eileen M. Hickey (1886–1960), Northern Irish politician
- Eileen Lemass (born 1932), Irish politician
- Eileen Malloy (born 1954), US ambassador
- Eileen Paisley, Baroness Paisley of St George's (born 1931), Northern Irish politician
- Eileen Parsons, British Virgin Islands politician
- Eileen Woestmann (born 1993), German politician

=== Sportspeople ===
- Eileen Ash (1911–2021), English cricketer
- Eileen Coparropa (born 1981), freestyle swimmer from Panama
- Eileen Ellison (1910–1967), English Grand Prix racer
- Eileen Gleeson (born 1972), Irish football manager
- Eileen Gu (born 2003), Chinese freestyle skier
- Eileen Hiscock (1909–1958), British athlete
- Eileen McNamara (born 1952), equestrian
- Eileen O'Keeffe (born 1981), Irish hammer thrower
- Eileen Bennett Whittingstall (1907–1979), UK tennis player

=== Writers ===
- Eileen Albrizio (born 1960), American writer
- Eileen Chang (1920–1995), Chinese writer
- Eileen Dunne (born 1958), Irish newsreader
- Eileen Gunn (born 1945), American science fiction writer and editor
- Eileen Kernaghan (born 1939), Canadian novelist
- Eileen McNamara (born 1952), American columnist and professor
- Eileen Myles (born 1949), American poet
- Eileen Pollock (writer) (1926–2012), American television screenwriter and producer
- Eileen Power (1889–1940), British economic historian and medievalist
- Eileen Tabios (born 1960), Filipino-American writer and artist
- Eileen Wilks (born 1952), American fiction writer

=== Other ===
- Eileen Barker (born 1938), British sociologist
- Eileen Blair (1905–1945), British poet and psychologist
- Eileen Caddy (1917–2006), founder of the Findhorn Foundation community
- Eileen Collins (born 1956), American astronaut
- Eileen de Coppet, Princess of Albania (1922–1985)
- Eileen Rockefeller Growald (born 1952), American philanthropist
- Eileen Nearne (1921–2010), member of UK Special Operations Executive (SOE)
- Eileen Costello O'Shaughnessy (died 1947), Irish murder victim
- Eileen Saxon (1942–1945), infant known as "The Blue Baby"
- Eileen Southern (1920–2002), African-American musicologist
- Eileen Tallman Sufrin (1913–1999), Canadian author and labour activist
- Eileen Vidal (1926–2003), kelper telephone and radio operator

== Characters ==
- Eileen Shallot, from the novella The Dream Master
- Eileen the Crow, from the 2015 video game Bloodborne
- Eileen Roberts, from the cartoon Regular Show
- Eileen Galvin, from the horror video game Silent Hill 4
- Eileen Leahy, from the television series Supernatural
- Eileen Grimshaw from the British soap opera Coronation Street
- Eileen, a fairy in the charmed ridge level from Spyro: Year of the Dragon
- Eileen, a character from Tyler Perry's 2013 film A Madea Christmas
- Eileen (Virtua Fighter), a character in the game Virtua Fighter 5
- Eileen, a character from Craig of the Creek
- Eileen, a character from Library of Ruina
- The Birthday Girl: Eileen
- Eileen Prince, mother of Severus Snape from the Harry Potter book series

== Media ==
- Eileen (film), a 2023 psychological thriller
- Eileen (novel), a 2015 novel
- Come on Eileen, a 1982 song by Dexys Midnight Runners

== See also ==
- Aileen, a given name
- Aylin, a given name
- Eileen Browne (disambiguation)
- Eileen O'Connell (disambiguation)
- Evelyn (disambiguation)
- Helen (disambiguation)
- Ilene, a given name
