= Aili =

Female given name

- Gender: Female
- Languages: Estonian, Finnish, Sami

Origin
- Meaning: Finnish version of Helga, "holy"

Aili is a Finnish, Sami and Estonian female given name, with the pronunciation [aɪliː]. It is the Finnish variation of the name Helga, via the Sami Áile, deriving ultimately from heilagr, meaning "holy", or "blessed". Ailikki is a diminutive.

Aili has also been used as an anglicised spelling of Eilidh, in this case with the pronunciation [eɪli]. Eilidh is the Gaelic variant of the Greek name Helen and also the Scottish diminutive of Eleanor. The meaning of Eleanor is disputed, but the theory most supported by evidence is that it is derived from the Old Germanic name Adenorde, via the Provençal Aliénor.

Aili can also be considered a diminutive for various names, such as Aileen, Eileen and Alice.

Some notable bearers of the name Aili:

- Aili Alliksoo (born 1959), Estonian sprinter and hurdler
- Aili Aarelaid-Tart (1947–2014), Estonian sociologist and cultural historian
- Aili Jõgi (1931–2017), Estonian patriot
- Aili Keskitalo (born 1968), Norwegian-Sami politician, president of the Sami Parliament of Norway
- Aili Siiskonen (1907–1983), Finnish journalist, civil servant and politician
- Aili M. Tripp (born 1958), Finnish-American political scientist
- Aili Vahtrapuu (1950–2024), Estonian sculptor
- Aili Vint (born 1941), Estonian artist
