= Mihkel Tüür =

Estonian architect

Mihkel Tüür (born 2 July 1976 in Tallinn) is an Estonian architect.

Tüür studied in the Estonian Academy of Arts in the department of architecture and city planning. He studied architecture 1996/7 in Ecole d'Architecture Paris Vale de Marne and 1999/2000 in Virginia Tech Architectural Consortium in Washington DC. He graduated from the Estonian Academy of Arts in 2001.

Tüür works in the architectural bureau KTA (Kadarik Tüür Arhitektid OÜ).

Notable works by Tüür are the central square of Rakvere, the apartment buildings in Laagri, Tallinn, the four apartment buildings in Rotermanni Quarter and the new apartment building in the old town of Tallinn. Tüür is a member of Union of Estonian Architects.

== Works ==
- Apartment building on Põldma Street, 2003 (with Ott Kadarik)
- Apartment buildings in Laagri, 2003 (with Ott Kadarik, Villem Tomiste)
- Central square of Rakvere, 2004 (with Villem Tomiste, Ott Kadarik Veronika Valk)
- Duplexes on Põdrakanepi Street, 2005 (with Ott Kadarik, Villem Tomiste)
- Apartment buildings in Rotermanni Quarter, 2007 (with Ott Kadarik, Villem Tomiste)
- Apartment building in Old Town of Tallinn, 2009 (with Ott Kadarik, Villem Tomiste)

== Competitions ==
- 1997 Ärihoone Kuressaares honorable mention M.Maiste, R.Kotov
- 1999 Tamme staadioni tribüün II prize O.Kadarik
- 2000 Pärnu Sütevaka kooli võimla arhitektuurivõistlus II prize O.Kadarik
- 2001 Urva 7 kortermaja kutsutud võistlus I prize O.Kadarik
- 2002 Mustjõe detailplaneering I prize V.Tomiste, O.Kadarik
- 2002 Kalevi kommivabriku ala planeering ostupreemia V.Tomiste, O.Kadarik
- 2003 Aia tänava äri- ja kortermaja kutsutud võistlus I prize V.Tomiste, O.Kadarik
- 2003 Tartu Emajõeäärse ala planeeringuvõistlus III prize V.Tomiste, O.Kadarik
- 2003 Kipsala saare planeeringuvõistlus runner-up V.Tomiste, O.Kadarik
- 2003 Linnahalli ümberehitus I-II prize V.Tomiste, O.Kadarik
- 2003 Tartu mnt.63, Marati kvartali juurdeehitus I prize V.Tomiste, O.Kadarik
- 2003 Marati Kvartali arhitektuurivõistlus I prize V.Tomiste, O.Kadarik, P.Ulman
- 2003 Paadi tänava hotelli kutsutud arhitektuurivõistlus I prize V.Tomiste, O.Kadarik, T.Hayashi
- 2003 Viimsi Koolimaja arhitektuurivõistlus ost V.Tomiste, O.Kadarik
- 2004 Rottermanni kvartali kutsutud arhitektuurivõistlus I prize V.Tomiste, O.Kadarik
- 2004 Tartu Fortuuna kvartali arhitektuurivõistlus III prize V.Tomiste, O.Kadarik
- 2004 Viljandi metsakalmistu kabel äramärgitud V.Tomiste, O.Kadarik
- 2005 Tartu Mõisavahe hoonestuskava ideekonkurss I prize V.Tomiste, O.Kadarik
- 2005 Tallinna Pritsumaja kvartali hoonestus, kutsutud võistlus I prize V.Tomiste, O.Kadarik
- 2005 ERMi uue hoone arhitektuurivõistlus ostupreemia V.Tomiste, O.Kadarik
- 2005 Kliversala saare planeeringuvõistlus ostupreemia V.Tomiste, O.Kadarik
- 2005 Skoone bastioni planeeringuvõistlus III prize V.Tomiste, O.Kadarik, P.Ulman
- 2006 Kiviõli Linnaväljaku arhitektuurivõistlus ostupreemia V.Tomiste, O.Kadarik, K.Kivi
- 2006 Maakri Kvartali arhitektuurivõistlus runner-up V.Tomiste, O.Kadarik
- 2006 Juhkentali Kvartali kutsutud arhitektuurivõistlus I prize V.Tomiste, O.Kadarik
- 2006 Paide Spordihalli arhitektuurivõistlus I prize V.Tomiste, O.Kadarik
- 2006 Pärnu Jõeäärse Planeeringu ideevõistlus III prize V.Tomiste, O.Kadarik
- 2006 TTÜ Raamatukogu arhitektuurivõistlus III prize V.Tomiste
- 2007 Patarei ja Lennusadama ala planeeringuvõistlus III prize V.Tomiste
- 2007 Paide Kutsekooli arhitektuurivõistlus I prize V.Tomiste, O.Kadarik
- 2007 Tamsalu keskosa ruumiline planeerimine III prize V.Tomiste, O.Kadarik
- 2007 Vabaõhumuuseumi arhitektuurivõistlus ostupreemia V.Tomiste, O.Kadarik
- 2008 Viljandi Kultuuriakadeemia uue hoone arhitektuurivõistlus honorable mention V.Tomiste, R.Poo-puu
- 2009 Kultuuritehase arhitektuurivõistlus III prize V.Tomiste, O.Kadarik
- 2009 Luther quarter urban planning competition I prize

== Articles ==
- MAJA 07.2008 Biooniline arhitektuur
- EE 21.12.2007 Võimalus ehitada kergelt
