= Ott Kadarik =

Estonian architect

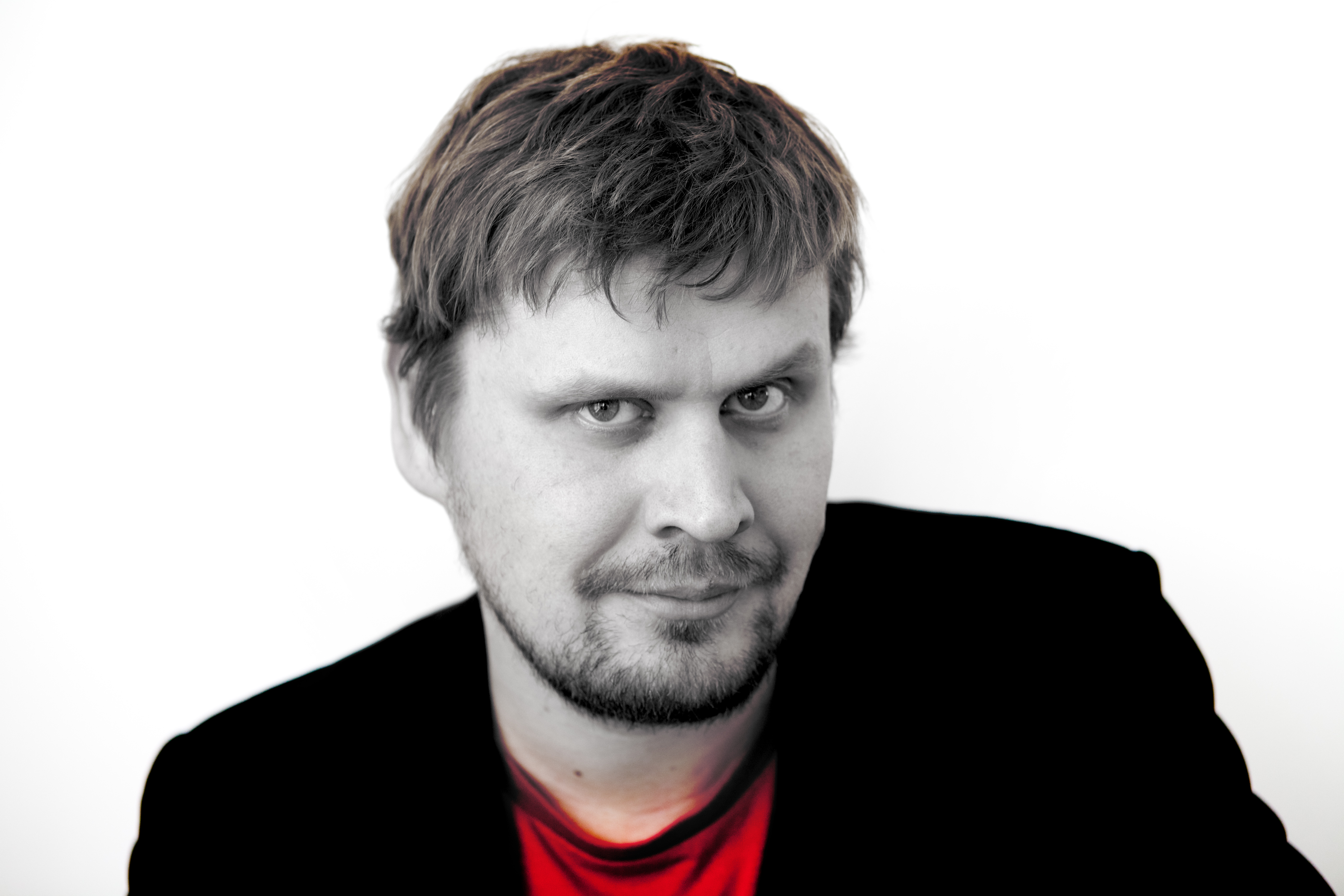
Ott Kadarik (2011)

Ott Kadarik (born May 9, 1976 in Tallinn) is an Estonian architect.

He graduated from the Department of Architecture of the Estonian Academy of Arts in 2000.

Ott Kadarik works in the architectural office KOSMOS OÜ.

Works by Ott Kadarik include the central square of Rakvere, the apartment buildings in Laagri, the four apartment buildings in the Rotermanni Quarter and the apartment building in the old town of Tallinn. Ott Kadarik is a member of the Union of Estonian Architects.

== Works ==
- Apartment building on Põldma Street, 2003 (with Mihkel Tüür)
- Apartment buildings in Laagri, 2003 (with Mihkel Tüür, Villem Tomiste)
- Central square of Rakvere, 2004 (with Villem Tomiste, Mihkel Tüür Veronika Valk)
- Duplexes on Põdrakanepi Street, 2005 (with Mihkel Tüür, Villem Tomiste)
- Apartment buildings in Rotermanni Quarter, 2007 (with Mihkel Tüür, Villem Tomiste)
- Apartment building in Old Town of Tallinn, 2009 (with Mihkel Tüür, Villem Tomiste)
- 5th Tallinn Applied Art Triennial, Main exhibition “KNOW HOW” design 2009 (with Tuuli Aule)

== Competitions ==
- 1997 Ärihoone Kuressaares II prize M.Kadarik
- 1998 Rakvere keskosa detailplaneering I prize V.Tomiste, V.Valk
- 1998 Vabaduse Väljaku planeering äramainimine V.Tomiste
- 1999 Hugo Treffneri Gümnaasiumi juurdeehitus I prize A.Lunge
- 1999 Tamme staadioni tribüün II prize M.Tüür
- 1999 Võru Keskväljaku ja selle Lähiümbruse detailplaneering ostupreemia V.Tomiste, V.Valk
- 2000 Pärnu rüütli platsi kujundus III prize R.Valner
- 2000 Lasnamäe spordihoone äramärkimine V.Tomiste, V.Valk
- 2000 Tartu sissesõidutähis I prize L.Torim
- 2000 Tartu Rüütli tänava kujundus I prize R.Valner
- 2000 Tallinna mereäärse ala planeeringuvõistlus ost R.Valner
- 2000 Europan 6 Viinis runner-up R.Valner, S.Vallner, K.Koov
- 2000 Pärnu Sütevaka kooli võimla arhitektuurivõistlus II prize M.Tüür
- 2000 Põlva keskosa planeeringuvõistlus ostupreemia V.Tomiste, V.Valk
- 2001 Urva 7 kortermaja kutsutud võistlus I prize M.Tüür
- 2002 Mustjõe detailplaneering I prize V.Tomiste, M.Tüür
- 2002 Kalevi kommivabriku ala planeering ostupreemia V.Tomiste, M.Tüür
- 2003 Aia tänava äri- ja kortermaja kutsutud võistlus I prize V.Tomiste, M.Tüür
- 2003 Tartu Emajõeäärse ala planeeringuvõistlus III prize V.Tomiste, M.Tüür
- 2003 Kipsala saare planeeringuvõistlus runner-up V.Tomiste, M.Tüür
- 2003 Linnahalli ümberehitus I-II prize V.Tomiste, M.Tüür
- 2003 Tartu mnt.63, Marati kvartali juurdeehitus I prize V.Tomiste, M.Tüür
- 2003 Marati Kvartali arhitektuurivõistlus I prize V.Tomiste, M.Tüür, P.Ulman
- 2003 Paadi tänava hotelli kutsutud arhitektuurivõistlus I prize V.Tomiste, M.Tüür, T.Hayashi
- 2003 Viimsi Koolimaja arhitektuurivõistlus ost V.Tomiste, M.Tüür
- 2004 Rottermanni kvartali kutsutud arhitektuurivõistlus I prize V.Tomiste, M.Tüür
- 2004 Tartu Fortuuna kvartali arhitektuurivõistlus III prize V.Tomiste, M.Tüür
- 2004 Viljandi metsakalmistu kabel äramärgitud V.Tomiste, M.Tüür
- 2005 Tartu Mõisavahe hoonestuskava ideekonkurss I prize V.Tomiste, M.Tüür
- 2005 Tallinna Pritsumaja kvartali hoonestus, kutsutud võistlus I prize V.Tomiste, M.Tüür
- 2005 ERMi uue hoone arhitektuurivõistlus ostupreemia V.Tomiste, M.Tüür
- 2005 Kliversala saare planeeringuvõistlus ostupreemia V.Tomiste, M.Tüür
- 2005 Skoone bastioni planeeringuvõistlus III prize V.Tomiste, M.Tüür, P.Ulman
- 2006 Kiviõli Linnaväljaku arhitektuurivõistlus ostupreemia V.Tomiste, M.Tüür, K.Kivi
- 2006 Maakri Kvartali arhitektuurivõistlus runner-up V.Tomiste, M.Tüür
- 2006 Juhkentali Kvartali kutsutud arhitektuurivõistlus I prize V.Tomiste, M.Tüür
- 2006 Paide Spordihalli arhitektuurivõistlus I prize V.Tomiste, M.Tüür
- 2006 Pärnu Jõeäärse Planeeringu ideevõistlus III prize V.Tomiste, M.Tüür
- 2006 TTÜ Raamatukogu arhitektuurivõistlus III prize V.Tomiste
- 2007 Patarei ja Lennusadama ala planeeringuvõistlus III prize V.Tomiste
- 2007 Paide Kutsekooli arhitektuurivõistlus I prize V.Tomiste, M.Tüür
- 2007 Tamsalu keskosa ruumiline planeerimine III prize V.Tomiste, M.Tüür
- 2007 Vabaõhumuuseumi arhitektuurivõistlus ostupreemia V.Tomiste, M.Tüür
- 2008 Viljandi Kultuuriakadeemia uue hoone arhitektuurivõistlus II prize
- 2008 Arhitektuurimuuseumi urbanistliku pargi konkurss II prize
- 2009 Kultuuritehase arhitektuurivõistlus III prize V.Tomiste, M.Tüür
- 2009 Hoolekandeküla arhitektuurivõistlus Äramärkimine V.Tomiste
- 2009 Tartu Füüsikahoone juurdeehituse arhitektuurivõistlus I prize V.Tomiste
- 2009 Tartu Füüsikahoone juurdeehituse arhitektuurivõistlus II prize V.Tomiste
