= Albrizio =

Albrizio is a surname. Notable people with the surname include:

- Conrad Albrizio (1894–1973), American muralist
- Eileen Albrizio (born 1963), American writer, proofreader, editor, and broadcast journalist

== See also ==
- Abrizio
