= Veronika Valk =

Estonian architect (born 1976)

Veronika Valk (born 21 November 1976 in Tallinn) is an Estonian architect.

== Biography ==
Veronika Valk graduated from Tallinn 21. Keskkool with gold medal in 1994. She studied in the Estonian Academy of Arts in the department of architecture and city planning. She graduated from the academy in 2001 with master's degree, cum laude. From 1996 to 1997 she studied in the Rhode Island School of Design.

In 2009, she received Estonian Cultural Endowment National Annual Award in architecture for Lasva Water Tower conversion into an Art Gallery (with Kadri Klementi, Kalle-Priit Pruuden, Peeter Laurits, Kalle Tikas).

From 1998 to 2002 Veronika Valk practiced as a freelance architect. From 2002 to 2005 Veronika Valk was founder, partner and architect in the Kavakava LLC architectural bureau. From 2005 to 2008 Veronika Valk was AD and co-producer of Tallinn Festival of Light, Valgusfestival. From 2004 to 2008 she was teaching at the Estonian Academy of Arts. In 2005 she founded, and to present works in the Zizi&Yoyo LLC. Since 2006, she is board member of NGO Kultuurikatel.

Most notable works by Veronika Valk are the central square of Rakvere, the sports hall of the Suure-Jaani Gymnasium, the monument of the composer Eduard Tubin and the reconstruction of the Lasva water tower. In addition Veronika Valk has successfully participated in numerous architectural competitions, won several awards, published over one hundred articles on architecture and urbanism. Veronika Valk is a member of the Union of Estonian Architects since 2001 (council member from 2004 to 2008). She has been council member of architecture magazine Ehituskunst and design magazine RUUM.

== Works ==
- Central square of Rakvere, 2000 (with Villem Tomiste and Ott Kadarik)
- Reconstruction of the Steineri garden in Pärnu, 2001 (with Villem Tomiste)
- Monument of Eduard Tubin in Tartu, 2006 (with sculptor Aili Vahtrapuu and sound designer Louis Dandrel)
- Sports hall of the Suure-Jaani Gymnasium, 2005
- Reconstruction of the Lasva water tower into an info point and art gallery 2009
- Interior design and landscaping of the Tarvastu kindergarten, 2009
- Single-family homes in Merirahu area, Tallinn

== Competitions ==
- 2008 I Tallinn (EE) I Poetess Marie Under Monument design competition (with Kirke Kangro), Honorable Mention
- 2007 I Viljandi (EE) I Arkaadia promenade landscaping competition, winning entry
- 2007 I Tallinn (EE) I Maakri District urban planning competition (with Leena Torim, Kadri Klementi, Tõnis Arjus, Eerik Kändler), 1st phase runner-up
- 2005 I Tallinn (EE) I Pae recreation park landscaping competition (with Kerli Raamsalu), winning entry
- 2005 I Tallinn (EE) I at Virgin Mary Russian orthodox church design competition (with Yoko Alender), Special Mention
- 2004 I Viljandi (EE) I Metsakalmistu Cemetery Chapel design competition (with Yoko Alender and Tuuli Köller), Special Mention
- 2004 I Tartu (EE) I Composer Eduard Tubin’s memorial design competition (with sculptor Aili Vahtrapuu), winning entry
- 2004 I Tallinn (EE) I Estonian Interior Defence Academy urban planning competition (with Kavakava architects), winning entry
- 2003 I Tallinn (EE) I “New Sakala” arthouse cinema architecture competition, 1st phase runner-up
- 2003 I Tallinn (EE) I Music Centre architecture competition (with Kavakava architects), Honorable Mention
- 2003 I Tallinn (EE) I Kalev Chocolate Factory and Tallinn Dairy Factory urban planning competition, 3rd prize
- 2002 I Tallinn (EE) I Mustjõe dwelling area urban planning competition, 3rd prize
- 2002 I London (UK) I Pilkington Glasshouse architecture competition, 1st commendation
- 2002 I Tallinn (EE) I at Tallinn entrance sign design competition (with Mariann Valk), winning entry
- 2001 I Pärnu (EE) I Pärnu Highschool sports hall architecture competition (with Viilem Tomiste), Honorable Mention
- 2001 I Võru (EE) I Olympic Park reconstruction landscaping competition (with Villem Tomiste), winning entry
- 2001 I Tallinn (EE) I Highschool No21 reconstruction architecture competition (with Villem Tomiste), 3rd prize
- 2001 I Pärnu (EE) I Steiner Garden landscaping design competition (with Villem Tomiste), winning entry
- 2001 I Narva (EE) I Narva City Centre urban planning competition (with Villem Tomiste), Honorable Mention
- 2000 I Tallinn (EE) I Tallinn Waterfront Area urban development competition (with Villem Tomiste), winning entry
- 2000 I Tartu (EE) I Ecological Building architecture competition (with Villem Tomiste), Two Honorable Mentions
- 2000 I Tallinn (EE) I Lasnamäe Sports Center architecture competition (with Villem Tomiste and Ott Kadarik), Two Honorable Mentions
- 2000 I Suure-Jaani (EE) I Suure-Jaani Highschool Sports Centre architecture competition, winning entry
- 2000 I Tartu (EE) I Baltic Defence College Square landscaping competition, winning entry
- 1999 I Tartu (EE) I Tartu University Dormitory architecture competition, 3rd prize
- 1999 I Põlva (EE) I Põlva City Centre urban planning competition (with Villem Tomiste and Ott Kadarik), Honorable Mention
- 1999 I Võru (EE) I Võru City Centre urban planning competition (with Villem Tomiste and Ott Kadarik), Honorable Mention
- 1999 I Kaali (EE) I Meteoritics Museum architecture competition (with Villem Tomiste), 2nd prize
- 1999 I Rakvere (EE) I Rakvere City Center urban planning competition (with Villem Tomiste and Ott Kadarik), winning entry
- 1998 I Väike-Munamäe (EE) I Väike-Munamäe Ski Center architecture competition, 2nd prize

== Installation art ==
- 2010 New York (US) ‘Brooklyn Ad Night’ screening in public space (with Ed Kimball and Karin Laansoo), PointB worklodge
- 2010 Stockholm (SE) ‘Building Blocks’ exhibition on architecture commissioned by children, Färgfabriken
- 2009 Tallinn (EE) architectural installation JOHAN:23 for Tallinn Design Night (with Johan Tali and Siim Tuksam)
- 2009 Ljubljana (SL) Svetlobna Gverila festival of light / lighting design installation Pattern (with Katri Kikkas)
- 2008 Beijing (CH) Creating Spaces – art bridge between EU and China / artworks Beijing Tricycle, Creativity Stamp, Scrubber
- 2007 Pärnu (EE) Set design for Kajakas (The Seagull, by A. Chekhov) at Endla Theatre
- 2006 Eindhoven (NL) GLOW festival / urban artwork Swinging In the Light
- 2006 Cardiff (UK) Urban Legacies II: New Babylon / indoor pneumatic installation Mikrouun
- 2007..2006 Lyon (FR) Fête des Lumières: Superflux / outdoor pneumatic installation Mikrouun
- 2008..2005 Tallinn (EE) lighting design installations Light Dome, Iglu, Swinging in the Light etc. for Tallinn Festival of Light Valgusfestival

== Exhibitions ==
- 2004 Hansalite, Tallinn, Arhitektuuri- ja Disainigalerii
- 2005 Young European Architects, Rotterdam, Netherlands Architecture Institute
- 2005 Designmai, Berlin
- 2008 BOOM/ROOM NEW ESTONIAN ARCHITECTURE, Tallinn, The Museum of Estonian Architecture
- 2009 Protsendiaeg, Tallinn, The Museum of Estonian Architecture

== Talks ==
- 2010 New York (US), PointB worklodge
- 2010 Aarhus (DK), Ȧrhus School of Architecture
- 2010 Gent (BE) Fragile conference at Sint-Lucas School of Architecture
- 2010 Melbourne (AU), Affirmative Architecture conference at RMIT University School of Architecture and Design
- 2010 Tallinn (EE), TEDx Tallinn, KUMU Museum of Estonian Art
- 2009 Tallinn (EE), Pecha Kucha Night, Tallinn Design Night (Prooviveski in Rotermanni quarters)
- 2009 Melbourne (AU), Parallax conference
- 2008 Beijing (CH), Tsinghua University, Department of Art & Design
- 2008 Tallinn (EE), Tallinn Vision Conference 2008
- 2008 Tallinn (EE), III Baltic Sea Region Energy Dialogue
- 2007 Tokyo (JA), New Trends of Architecture in Europe and Asia-Pacific 2006-2007, Showa Women’s University
- 2006 Patras (GR), New Trends of Architecture in Europe and Asia-Pacific 2006-2007, University of Patras
- 2004 Tokyo (JA), Pecha Kucha Night at Superdeluxe by Klein Dytham architecture
