= Ilene =

Ilene is a given name. Notable people with the name include:

- Ilene Beckerman (born 1935), American writer
- Ilene Berns (1943–2017), American record company director
- Ilene Chaiken (born 1957), American television producer and writer
- Ilene Erskine (1933—2018), Scottish educational psychologist, artist and printmaker.
- Ilene Graff (born 1949), American actress and singer
- Ilene Hamann (born 1984), South African actress and model
- Ilene Kristen (born 1952), American actress
- Ilene Woods (1929–2010), American singer and actress
- Danella Ilene (born 1996), Indonesian fashion model

== See also ==
- Eileen, a given name
- Ilene Markham, reoccurring fictional character on the TV series Home Improvement (TV series)

Media related to Ilene at Wikimedia Commons
