= Villem Tomiste =

Estonian architect

Villem Tomiste (born 8 August 1975 in Tallinn) is an Estonian architect.

He graduated from high school in 1993 Tallinna Liivalaia Gümnaasium. Tomiste was enrolled as a student of the Tallinn University of Technology the same year. The architectural degree was acquired in Estonian Academy of Arts from 1994 to 2000.

He worked as an editor for the daily newspaper Post from 1993 to 1997. Tomiste also was part of the pop/rap-group Must Q for two years since 1995. From 2000 till 2002 he practiced as a freelance architect. Since 2002 he is a partner in architectural office KOSMOS. In 2012 office name was changed into Stuudio Tallinn.

He is best known for his wide range of completed works and polemical/published interventions concerning the subject of urbanity and city-life. The completed works include: the Central Square for the Town of Rakvere; apartment buildings in Laagri; a mixed-use city-block in Rotermanni Quarter in the City of Tallinn and the apartment building with retail space in the Old Town part in the City of Tallinn. The best known speculative propositions are the vision for the Viru Square in Tallinn, as a pedestrian area free of car-traffic (2004) and alternative visions for the spire of the church of the Holy Ghost in Tallinn, which was destroyed in fire (2002). The built and envisioned spaces and structures created with Ott Kadarik and Mihkel Tüür (architectural office KOSMOS) are distinctive for playful use of materials, their dramatic spatial language and hypermodern layout of volumes. Next to the built edifices and philanthropic urban proposals he has successfully participated in multiple local and international competitions. He was awarded with Urban Studies Prize by the Cultural Endowment of Estonia in 2003 and as part of the architectural practice KOSMOS he won the Estonian Republic’s national Cultural Advancement Award for the city-block in Rotermanni Quarter in 2008.

Villem Tomiste is a member of the Union of Estonian Architects since 2001 and Member of Chair of the Union of Estonian Architects since 2002. Since 2010 Villem Tomiste is Vice-Chairman of The Union of Estonian Architects. He was also part of the Architectural Council for the Tallinn City Centre from 2005 to 2006. In 2011 he organized first Tallinn Architecture Biennale with Estonian Architecture Center.

== Selected projects ==
- Reconstruction of the Steiner garden in Pärnu, 2001 (with Veronika Valk)
- Alternative vision for the spire of the church of the Holy Ghost in Tallinn, 2002 (with Ott Kadarik, Mihkel Tüür)
- Apartment buildings in Laagri, 2003 (with Ott Kadarik, Mihkel Tüür)
- Central square of Rakvere, 2004 (with Ott Kadarik, Mihkel Tüür, Veronika Valk)
- Alternative vision for the Viru Square, 2004 (with Ott Kadarik, Mihkel Tüür)
- Duplexes on Põdrakanepi Street, 2005 (with Ott Kadarik, Mihkel Tüür)
- Rotermanni Quarter, 2007 (with Ott Kadarik, Mihkel Tüür)
- Apartment building Aiamaja in the Old Town of Tallinn, 2009 (with Ott Kadarik, Mihkel Tüür)

== Competitions ==
- 1997 Modular kiosk architectural competition; I prize
- 1998 Vabaduse square planning competition (with Ott Kadarik); runner-up
- 1999 Rakvere center planning competition (with Ott Kadarik, Veronika Valk); I prize
- 1999 Kaali meteorite museum architectural competition (with Veronika Valk); II prize
- 1999 Võru central area planning competition (with Ott Kadarik, Veronika Valk); honorary prize
- 2000 Lasnamäe sports hall architectural competition (with Veronika Valk); honorable mention
- 2000 Lasnamäe sports hall architectural competition (with Ott Kadarik, Veronika Valk); runner-up
- 2000 Tartu ecological building architectural competition (with Veronika Valk); I honorary prize
- 2000 Tartu ecological building architectural competition (with Veronika Valk); II honorary prize
- 2000 Tallinn coastal area planning competition (with Veronika Valk); I prize
- 2000 Tallinn School No. 21 architectural competition (with Veronika Valk); III prize
- 2000 Munamäe skiing center architectural competition (with Veronika Valk); III prize
- 2000 Võru central square architectural competition (with Veronika Valk); I-II prize
- 2000 Pärnu Sütevaka Private High School gymnasium architectural competition (with Veronika Valk); honorary prize
- 2000 Põlva central area planning competition (with Ott Kadarik, Veronika Valk); honorary prize
- 2001 Suurejaani High School architectural competition (with Veronika Valk); I prize
- 2001 Narva Peetri square planning competition (with Veronika Valk); III prize
- 2001 Steiner garden landscape competition võistlus (with Veronika Valk); I prize
- 2002 Narva, Tallinna and Kangelaste intersection planning competition; III prize
- 2002 Tallinn, Admiraliteed Bassein, planning competition; I prize
- 2002 Tallinn, Vanasadam, planning competition; I prize
- 2002 Mustjõe planning competition (with Ott Kadarik, Mihkel Tüür); I prize
- 2002 Kalev candy factory planning competition (with Ott Kadarik, Mihkel Tüür); honorary prize
- 2003 Tallinn, Aia st.4 architectural competition (with Ott Kadarik, Mihkel Tüür); I prize
- 2003 Tartu, Emajõe planning competition (with Ott Kadarik, Mihkel Tüür); III prize
- 2003 Riga, Ķīpsala planning competition (with Ott Kadarik, Mihkel Tüür); honorary prize
- 2003 Tallinn, Linnahall architectural competition (with Ott Kadarik, Mihkel Tüür); I-II prize
- 2003 Pärnu gymnasium architectural competition (with Mihkel Tüür); III prize
- 2003 Marati quarter architectural competition (with Ott Kadarik, Mihkel Tüür, Paco Ulman); I prize
- 2003 Paadi st. hotel hotelliarchitectural competition (with Tomomi Hayashi, Ott Kadarik, Mihkel Tüür); I prize
- 2003 Viimsi High School architectural competition (with Ott Kadarik, Mihkel Tüür); honorary prize
- 2004 Rottermanni quarter architectural competition (with Ott Kadarik, Mihkel Tüür); I prize
- 2004 Tartu Fortuuna quarter architectural competition (with Ott Kadarik, Mihkel Tüür); III prize
- 2004 Viljandi cemetery chapel architectural competition (with Ott Kadarik, Mihkel Tüür); honorary prize
- 2005 Tartu, Mõisavahe planning competition (with Ott Kadarik, Mihkel Tüür); I prize
- 2005 Tallinn, Pritsumaja quarter architectural competition (with Ott Kadarik, Mihkel Tüür); I prize
- 2005 Estonian National Museum architectural competition (with Ott Kadarik, Urmas Oja, Krista Saluveer, Mihkel Tüür); honorary prize
- 2005 Riga, Klīversala island planning competition (with Ott Kadarik, Mihkel Tüür); honorary prize
- 2005 Skoone Bastion planning competition (with Ott Kadarik, Mihkel Tüür, Paco Ulman); III prize
- 2006 Kiviõli, central square landscape competition (with Ott Kadarik, Mihkel Tüür, Kaiko Kivi); honorary prize
- 2006 Maakri quarter planning competition (with Ott Kadarik, Mihkel Tüür); honorary prize
- 2006 Juhkentali quarter architectural competition (with Ott Kadarik, Mihkel Tüür); I prize
- 2006 Paide gymnasium architectural competition (with Ott Kadarik, Mihkel Tüür); II prize
- 2006 Pärnu, Jõeäärse planning competition (with Ott Kadarik, Mihkel Tüür); III prize
- 2006 Tallinna Tehnikaülikool Library architectural competition (with Ott Kadarik); III prize
- 2007 Tallinn, Patarei area planning competition (with Ott Kadarik); III prize
- 2007 Paide Vocational Training Centre arhitektuurivõistlus architectural competition (with Ott Kadarik, Mihkel Tüür); I prize
- 2007 Tamsalu central area planning competition (with Ott Kadarik, Mihkel Tüür); III prize
- 2007 Estonian Open Air Museum architectural competition (with Ott Kadarik, Mihkel Tüür); honorary prize
- 2008 Estonian University of Life Sciences architectural competition; honorary prize
- 2008 Tallinn Pirita st. 26 architectural competition (with Ott Kadarik); I-II prize
- 2008 Viljandi Culture Academy architectural competition (with Reedik Poo-Puu, Mihkel Tüür); honorary prize
- 2008 Tallinn, the Museum of Estonian Architecture, landscape competition; I prize
- 2009 Kultuurikatel architectural competition (with Ott Kadarik, Mihkel Tüür); III prize
- 2009 Hoolekandeküla architectural competition (with Ott Kadarik); honorary prize
- 2009 Institute of Physics, University of Tartuarchitectural competition (with Ott Kadarik); I-III prize
- 2009 Institute of Physics, University of Tartuarchitectural competition (with Ott Kadarik); I-III prize
- 2009 Tartu Maraton, monument competition; honorary prize

== Exhibitions ==
- 2003 Vision for Pirita st., Tallinn, Arhitektuuri- ja Disainigalerii
- 2004 Viru Plats 2008, Tallinn, Arhitektuuri- ja Disainigalerii
- 2004 Collage Europa, Rotterdam, NAI
- 2005 Emerging Identities, Berlin, DAZ
- 2006 Skaalanihe – skulptuur avatud mänguväljal, Tallinn, KUMU
- 2006 Raine Karp, isikunäituse koostamine ja kujundus, Tallinn, The Museum of Estonian Architecture
- 2008 FOR THE ROAD - EUROPEAN DESIGN TOUR, Budapest, Design Terminál Kht.
- 2008 BOOM/ROOM NEW ESTONIAN ARCHITECTURE, Tallinn, The Museum of Estonian Architecture
- 2011 Borders of architecture 2: housing, Louisiana Museum of Modern Art, Denmark
- 2011 11FLIRTS – Curator exhibition of the TAB Tallinn Architecture Biennale, Kadriorg Palace, Tallinn
- 2012 EIGHT EIGHTS / KAHEKSA KAHEKSAT, Tallinn, The Museum of Estonian Architecture
