= Rotermanni Quarter =

Historic industrial area in Tallinn

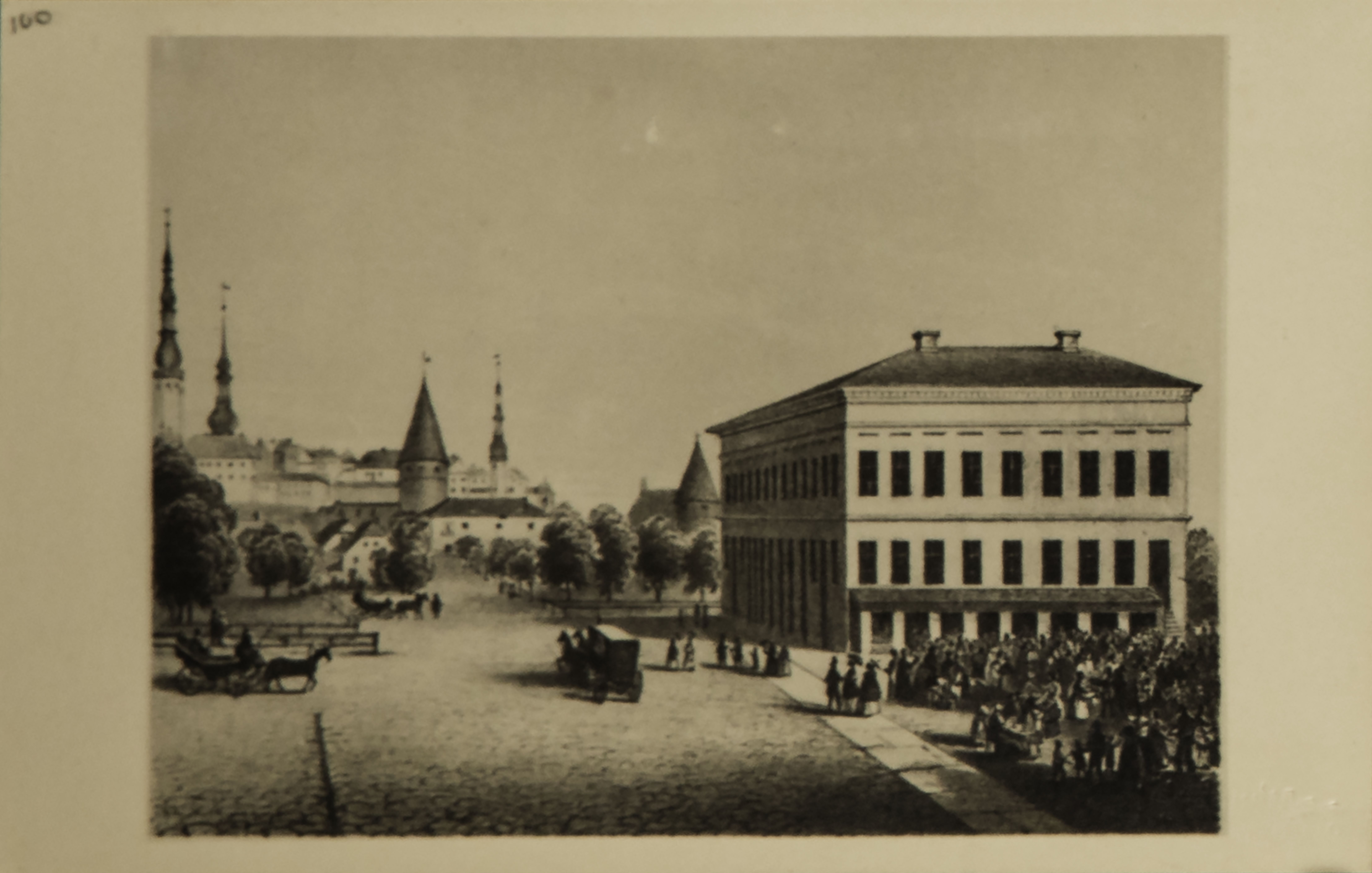
19th century view

Rotermanni Quarter is an area in the downtown of Tallinn, Estonia. It is located between Tallinn Old Town, the Port of Tallinn and Viru Square.

This area has played an important role in Tallinn's history; in the 19th century it was the crossing of roads from Tartu, Narva and Pärnu. There were also other big industrial companies in the area.

The developer of the quarter is Rotermann City OÜ (founded by Urmas Sõõrumaa).

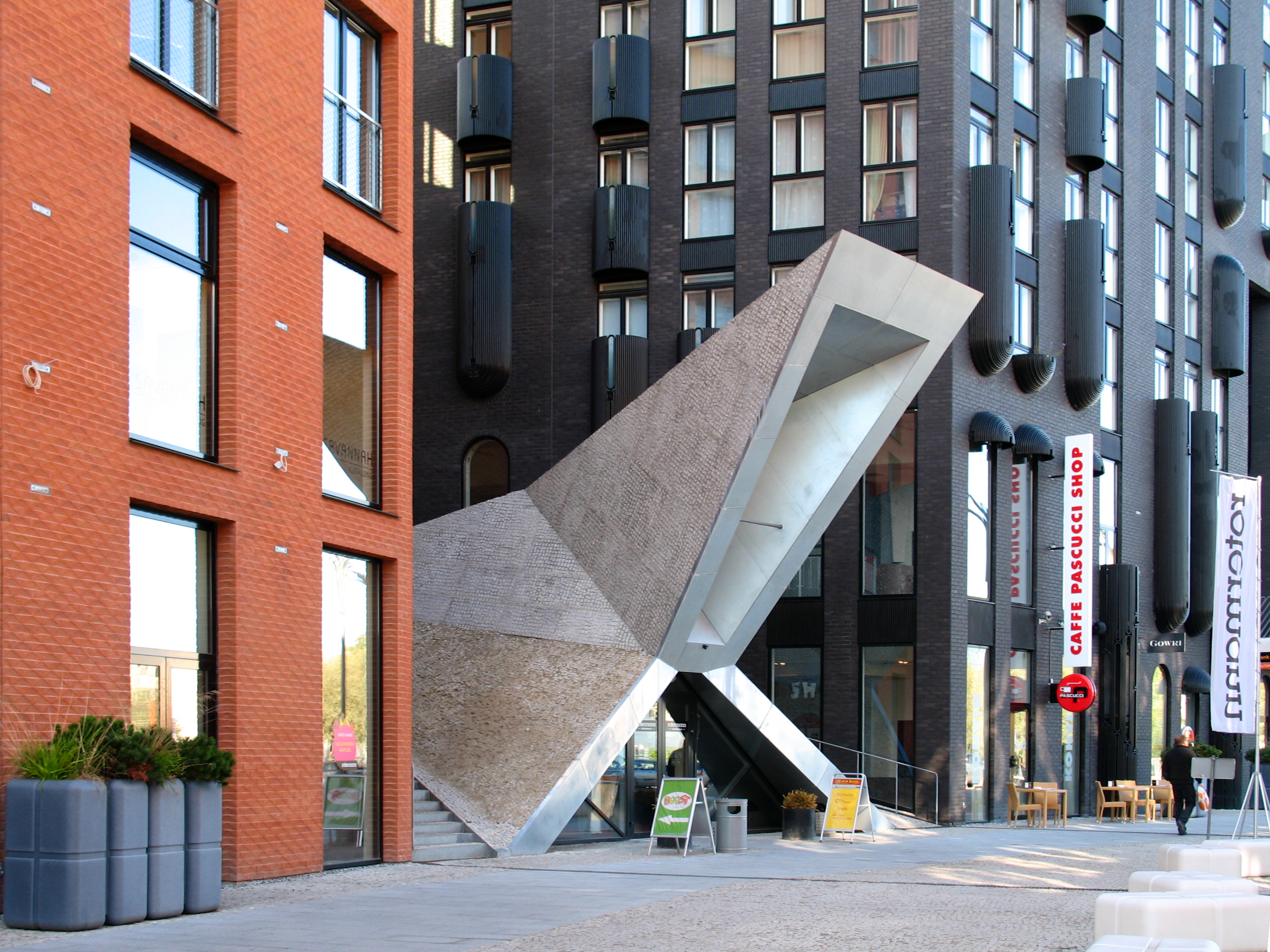
Apartment block in Rotermanni

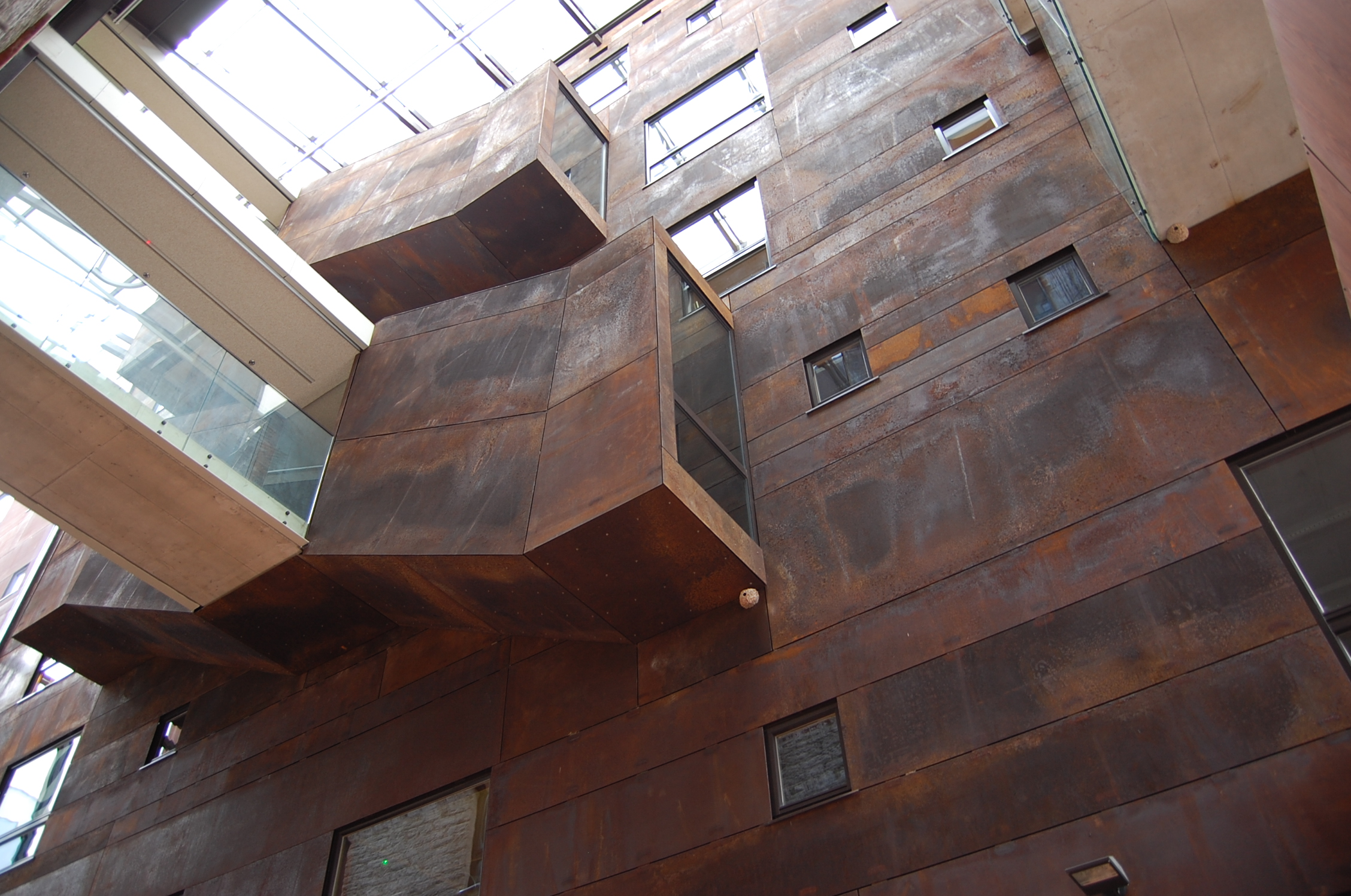
Interior design in Rotermanni

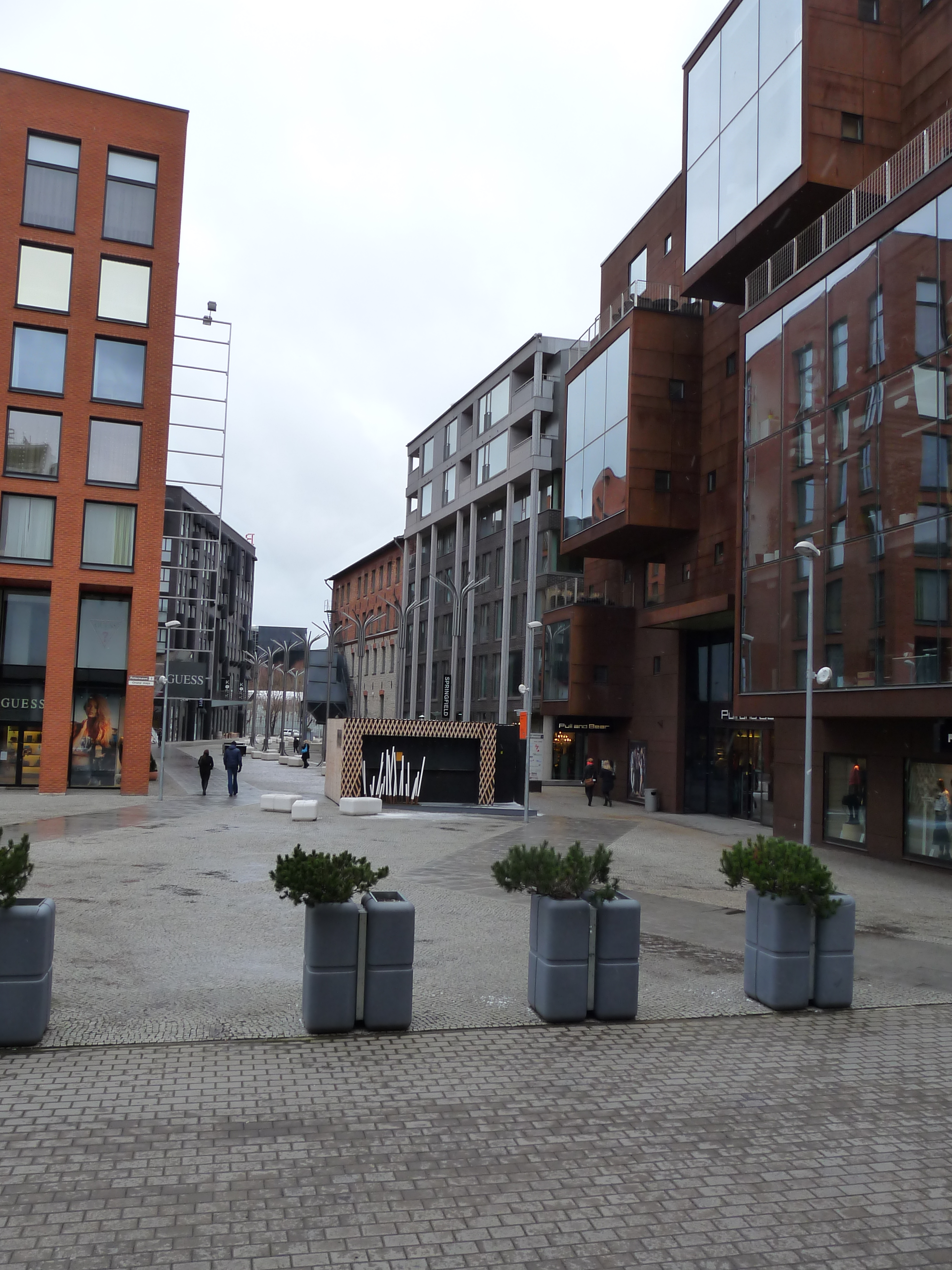
Rotermanni Square and Street

Flour storage buildings in Rotermanni

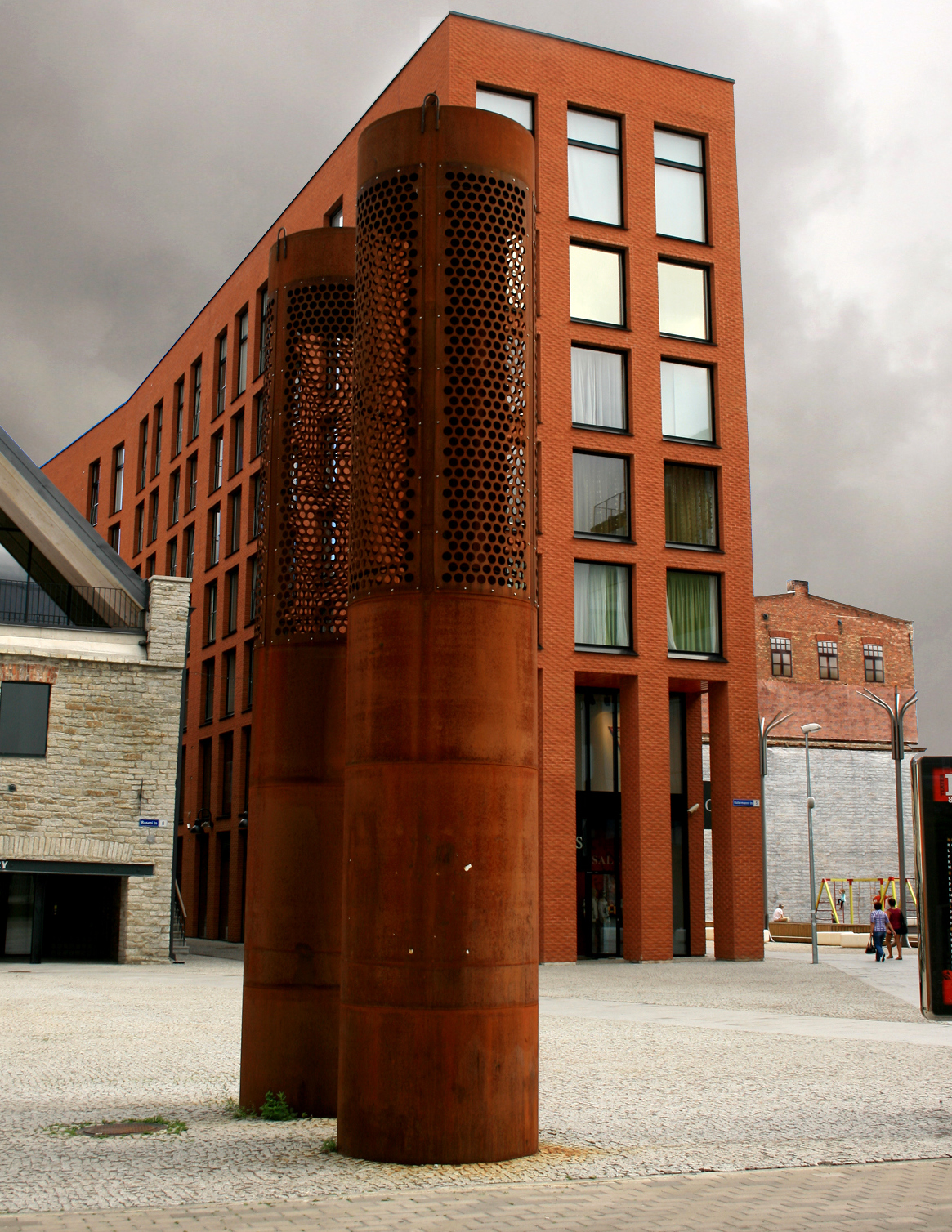
Design details on the main square

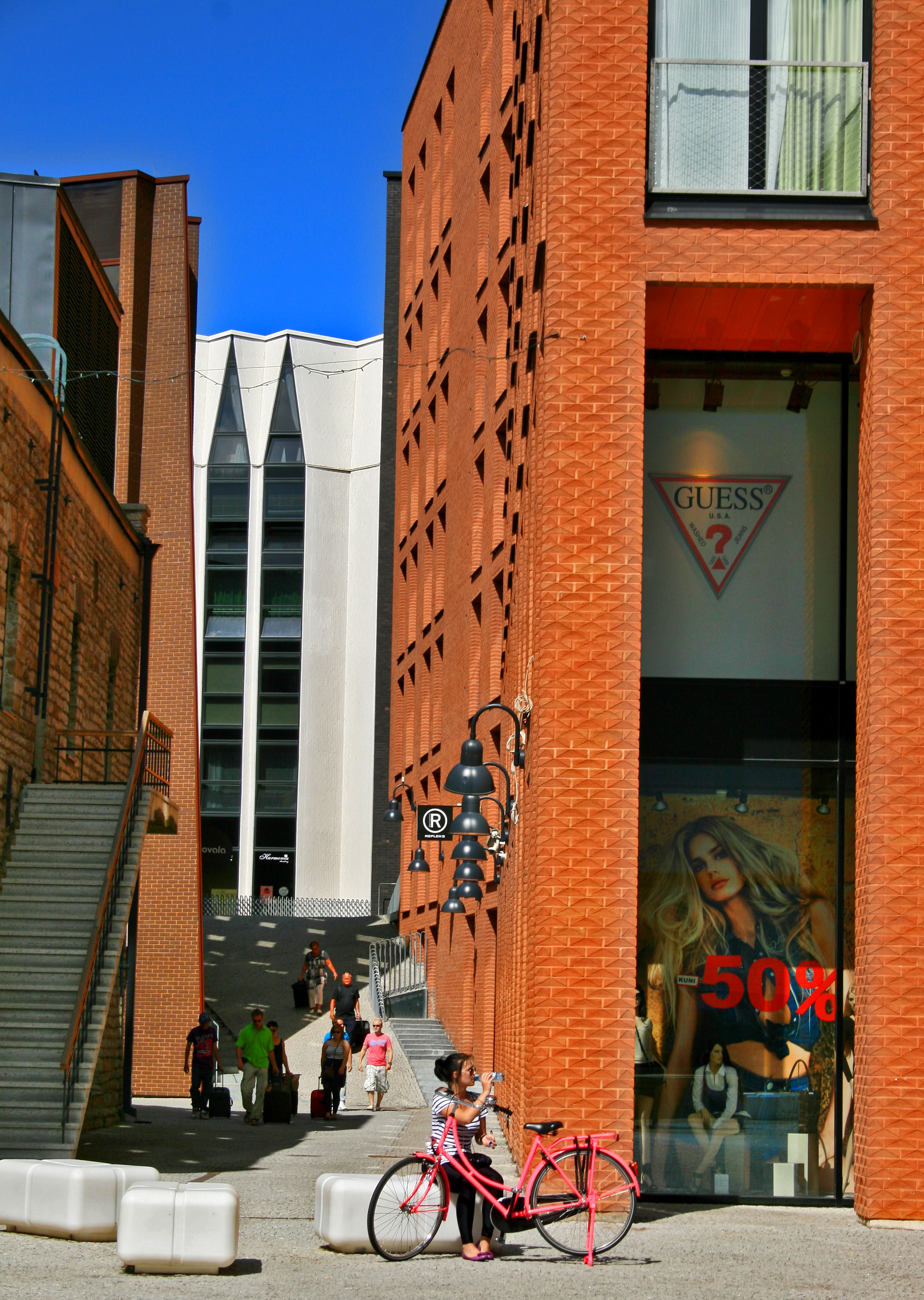
Interior streets of apartment buildings

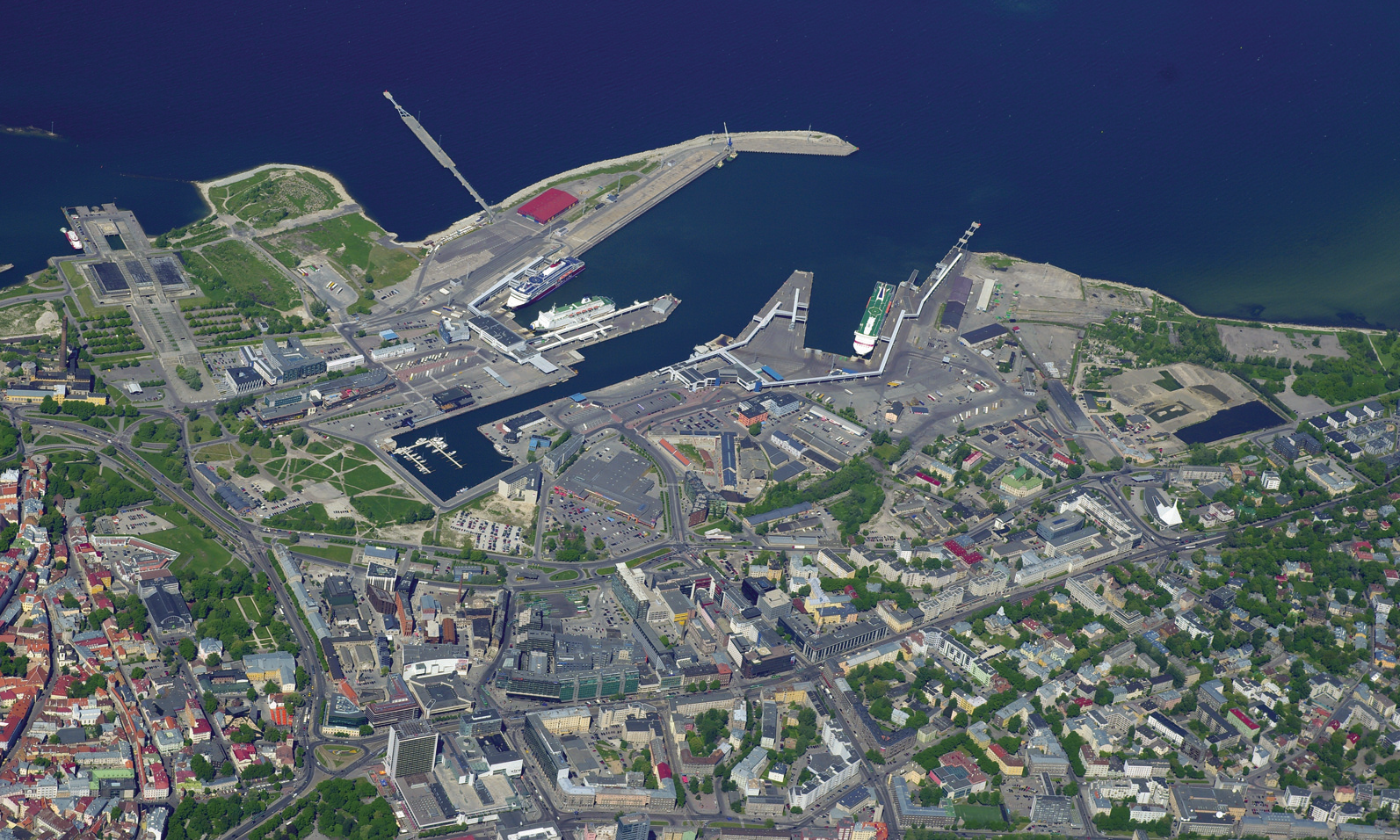
Aerial view of Rotermanni and the Port of Tallinn

Streets have been renamed to Rotermanni Street, Roseni Street and Stalker gangway, in the centre of the area is a public square called the Rotermanni Square.

The area of the buildings is over 50,000 square meters, including over 370 apartments and about 600 underground parking spaces.

== See also ==
- Vilnius CBD, Lithuania
- Skanste, Latvia
