= Eileen (singer) =

American singer-songwriter (born 1941)

- Also known as: Eileen Robinson
- Born: Eileen Goldsen; 16 May 1941 (age 85); New York City, New York, U.S.
- Genres: Pop, yé-yé
- Occupations: Singer, songwriter, music publisher
- Years active: 1964–1969, 1982

Eileen Goldsen (born May 16, 1941) is an American-born former pop singer, songwriter and music publisher, who has mainly worked and lived in France since the 1960s. Her recordings credit her mononymously as Eileen.

== Biography ==
She was born in New York City, the daughter of Mickey Goldsen (1912–2011), a music publisher who founded the Criterion Music Corporation. Eileen Goldsen studied languages, including French, at the University of California, Los Angeles, graduating in 1963. The following year, she settled in Paris, France, initially working as a teacher, and was asked to translate American folk songs into French. Lucien Morisse, director of the radio station Europe 1, suggested she make recordings of her own songs, and she found some success with her songs "Prends ta guitare" and "Une grenouille dans le vent", issued on the AZ label and credited simply to Eileen. In 1965, she married producer and songwriter Jacques Robinson.

In early 1966, she recorded versions of "These Boots Are Made for Walkin'" – a song published by her father's company – in English, French ("Ces bottes sont faites pour marcher"), German ("Die Stiefel sind zum Wandern") and Italian ("Questi stivali sono fatti per camminare"). Her session musicians included American guitarist Mickey Baker. Although the recordings were promoted on TV programmes and had some success, they lost out commercially to Nancy Sinatra's original recording. In April 1966, she was included in Jean-Marie Périer's photograph of 46 yé-yé and other French pop singers known as "La Photo du siècle". She also recorded an English version of Sinatra's follow-up record, "How Does That Grab You, Darlin'?", and a version of "Love Is Strange", originally recorded in 1956 by Baker with Sylvia Robinson as Mickey and Sylvia. She continued to record in France until 1969, when she gave up recording until a brief comeback in 1982.

She founded a music publishing company, French Fried Music, in Paris.

== List of Songs ==
This is a list of her songs sung in the various languages. Given is also the composer and the texter. Source is

| Song in English language | Song in French language | Song in German language | Song in Italian language | year | Other |
|---|---|---|---|---|---|
| Bring your guitar Eileen | Prends Ta Guitare fr. text: Eileen | Nimm die Gitarre ge. text: Ria Bartok | Suona Chitarra it. text: D.R. | 1966 | |
| Everybody's Talking; Fred Neil | - | - | - | ? | |
| Hard times Mickey Baker | - | - | - | 1968 | |
| How Does That Grab You? Lee Hazlewood | - | Das wird mir nicht mal leid tun ge. text: Loose | - | 1966 | |
| These Boots Are Made For Walking; Lee Hazlewood | Ces Bottes Sont Faites Pour Marcher fr. text: Eileen | Die Stiefel sind zum Wandern ge. text: Bert Reisfeld | Questi stivali sono fatti per camminare it. text: Pallavicini, Parigi | 1966 | |
| Love Is Strange; Bo Diddley | - | - | - | 1966 | |
| Summer Loves True; Don Paul, Mickey Baker | Le Parfum Des Bois fr. text: Eileen, André Salvet | - | - | 1966 | |
| - | Au Revoir; Eileen, Pierre Barouh | - | - | 1965 | |
| - | Dépêche toi Baby (=Hurry On Down); Eileen, Martine Habib, Nellie Lutcher | - | - | 1969 | |
| - | Est-Ce Un Fantôme ? (=A Windmill in Old Amsterdam); Eileen, Myles Rudge, Ted Dicks | - | - | 1966 | |
| - | Galactic Fred (=Fred vom Jupiter) fr. text: E. Chamussy; Dorau, Maurischat | - | - | 1982 | |
| - | Je Cherche Un Coin De Terre (=?); Eileen; Mike Settle | - | - | 1966 | |
| - | José Disait (=?); Eileen, André Salvet; Bert Russell | - | - | 1965 | |
| - | L'universite; Eileen | - | - | 1964 | |
| - | La P'tite Flûte; Eddy Marnay, Emil Stern | - | - | 1969 | |
| - | La ville ne dort jamais la nuit (=The City Never Sleeps at Night); Eileen; Lee Hazlewood | - | - | 1966 | |
| - | Le Lady Scott; Eileen, Martine Habib | - | - | 1969 | |
| - | Le Métro De Boston (=M.T.A.); Eileen; Jacqueline Steiner, Bess Lomax Hawes | - | - | 1964 | |
| - | Le Skip; Eileen, Jacques Chaumelle | - | - | 1965 | |
| - | Les Pigeons; Eileen, Billy Bridge | - | - | 1967 | |
| - | Midi C'est L'heure De Manger; Eileen, Georges Cockenzie | - | - | 1969 | |
| - | Mississippi Woman [Elle Attend Son Capitaine] Eileen, Georges Chatelain | - | - | 1969 | |
| - | Mon Enfant Qui Dort; Eileen, Martine Habib | - | - | 1970 | |
| - | Mon Frère Le Poisson; Eileen | - | - | 1966 | |
| - | Ne Condamnez Pas Ce Beau Garçon; Michel Jourdan; Jonathan Peel, Richard Kerr | - | - | 1967 | |
| - | Ni Jamais (=So Long Babe); Eileen, Jean-Michel Rivat; Lee Hazlewood | - | - | 1966 | |
| - | Oklahoma Hills (French); Eileen; Jack Guthrie, Woody Guthrie | - | - | 1964 | |
| - | Pourqui Coulera La Fontaine; Charles Level | - | - | 1967 | |
| - | Texas (=?); Eileen, Jean-Michel Rivat; Lee Hazlewood | - | - | 1966 | |
| - | Tout Le Monde Est Fou (=Lookin' out My Back Door); Eileen; John Fogerty | - | - | 1970 | |
| - | Une Grenouille Dans Le Vent; Eileen | - | - | 1965 | |
| - | Vive La Société (=Ain't Society Great ?); Eileen, Martine Habib; Bobby Russell, Jerry Allison | - | - | 1969 | |
| - | - | Teenage summer Sonneborn, Montague, Horn | - | 1966 | |
| - | - | - | Ragazzo it. text: Eileen; Claudio, Bonfanti | ? | |
