= Aileen MacKeogh =

Irish sculptor and academic, first director of Arthouse

- Born: 16 September 1952; Dublin
- Died: 23 May 2005 (aged 52); Dublin
- Education: National College of Art and Design
- Known for: first director of Arthouse

Aileen MacKeogh (16 September 1952–23 May 2005), was an Irish sculptor and academic. She was a Fulbright scholar, the first director of Arthouse in Dublin's Temple Bar and later Head of the School of Art, Design and Media at the Institute of Art, Design and Technology in Dun Laoghaire.

== Early life and education ==
Aileen MacKeogh was born in Dublin on 16 September 1952, daughter to an auctioneer. She studied and trained at the National College of Art & Design in Dublin from 1973 to 1976, graduating with a BA in Fine Art. She went on to take an MFA in Sculpture in 1981, from Southern Illinois University, before returning to Ireland.

== Career ==
MacKeogh became the first director of the Arthouse Multimedia Centre in Temple Bar, Dublin. MacKeogh was also integral to creating the National Film School. She had also taken up a position with the Institute of Art, Design and Technology (IADT) in Dun Laoghaire, where she worked on setting up the MAVIS programme. She later became the Head of School of Art, Design & Media at the IADT in 1997.

She was a pioneer of digital media and worked as executive producer on The Art Files and Profiles, two television shows about art and the artist.

From 1983 to 1987 MacKeogh chaired the Irish Exhibition of Living Art.

== Exhibitions and installations ==
- Forest Fragments, Project Arts Centre, 1982
- Thedral Thicket, Triskel, Cork, 1983
- Landlesions, Hendriks Gallery, 1986
- House, Project Arts Centre, 1991

== Personal life ==
MacKeogh met Tom Inglis at the Stella in Mount Merrion in 1969, and they married in 1973. Inglis - later a sociology professor at University College Dublin - and MacKeogh had three children. One died when just nine months old, after a domestic accident with a babysitter, after which MacKeogh took a two-year career break.

MacKeogh died of breast cancer after a three-year illness in 2005. She is memorialised by the Aileen MacKeogh Award for Outstanding Achievement in Filmmaking, and in a memoir by her husband, Making Love, published in 2012.
