= Aileen S. Kraditor =

American historian (1928–2020)

- Born: April 12, 1928; Brooklyn, New York
- Died: March 8, 2020 (aged 91); Worcester, Massachusetts
- Occupation: Historian
- Known for: History of feminism

Aileen S. Kraditor (April 12, 1928 – March 8, 2020) was an American historian who wrote a number of works on the history of feminism.

== Career ==
Aileen Kraditor obtained a B.A. at Brooklyn College and then an M.A. and Ph.D. at Columbia University. She taught at Rhode Island College before obtaining a position at Boston University in 1973, as a teacher of the history of modern US reform movements. She was granted fellowships by the Guggenheim Foundation and the National Endowment for the Humanities. As of 2014 she was Professor Emerita of History at Boston University.

== Views ==
Kraditor started her career as a self-proclaimed radical leftist and converted to conservatism in the 1980s. Early on, she was influenced by Betty Friedan, author of The Feminine Mystique. Writing in the mid-1960s, she made the case that to understand the history of women in America it was necessary to look at ideology as well as events. Her The Ideas of the Woman Suffrage Movement (1965) was a pioneering work on the subject of great value to later historians. She noted that there was a gradual shift in the arguments of suffragists from "justice" to "expediency." The 19th-century activists argued that women should be treated equally to men because of justice and natural rights. Later activists stressed that "woman suffrage would benefit society."

In her important introduction to the anthology up From the Pedestal (1968), she said that "the question of 'spheres'", which seemed to somehow be linked to the industrial revolution, was key to understanding feminism in America. She contrasted "women's proper sphere" to "autonomy" and pointed out how much emphasis the opponents of women's suffrage placed on preserving separate spheres. Kraditor admired the social perfectionists led by William Lloyd Garrison. In 1973, she said that the Liberty Party was "conceived in frustration, acted out a farce, and died in betrayal." Kraditor's early history of female abolitionists went into detail on men's objections to the public roles that abolitionist women played; these objections may have helped inspire women.

Kraditor was a member of the Communist Party for eleven years. She noted there were two types of members, those driven by hostility and those who were generous and kind, both types being sincere idealists who deeply believed in justice, equality and ending poverty and discrimination. Commenting on the communist historian Herbert Aptheker, Kraditor pointed out, "Aptheker kept repeating that certain turn-of-the [19th] century racist historians of Reconstruction typified academic scholarship in that field, long after this had stopped being true."

After becoming a conservative and joining the editorial board of the periodical Continuity, she "deplored the earlier Marxist jargon she had used." She wrote for Modern Age, a conservative review.

== Works ==
Kraditor's published works include:

- Kraditor, Aileen S. (1951). Thomas Cooper's Materialism.
- Kraditor, Aileen S. (1965). The Ideas of the Women Suffrage Movement, 1890-1920. New York: Columbia University Press.
- Kraditor, Aileen S. (1968). Up from the pedestal selected writings in the history of American feminism. Chicago: Quadrangle Books.
- Kraditor, Aileen S., ed. (1969). Means and Ends in American Abolitionism: Garrison and His Critics on Strategy and Tactics, 1834-1850. New York: Pantheon Books.
- Kraditor, Aileen S. (1981-01-01). The Radical Persuasion, 1890-1917: Aspects of the Intellectual History and the Historiography of Three American Radical Organizations. Louisiana State University Press. ISBN 978-0-8071-0864-2.
- Kraditor, Aileen S. (1988). "Jimmy Higgins": The Mental World of the American Rank-and-file Communist, 1930-1958. Greenwood Press. ISBN 978-0-313-26246-3.

== Sources ==
- "Aileen Kraditor". Boston University.
- Harrold, Stanley (March 2011). "Abolitionist Politics". Reviews in American History. 39 (1): 95–100. doi:10.1353/rah.2011.0035. S2CID 201779002.
- Henry, Sarah M. (July 1997). "The Thirty-sixth State: Woman Suffrage in Tennessee and Beyond". H-Pol.
- Keetley, Dawn; Pettegrew, John (2005-01-01). A Documentary History of American Feminism: 1900 To 1960. Rowman & Littlefield. ISBN 978-0-7425-2225-1.
- Kerber, Linda K. (1997). Toward an Intellectual History of Women: Essays. Chapel Hill: University of North Carolina Press. Archived from the original on 2020-11-19.
- Lewy, Guenter (1990-09-13). The Cause That Failed : Communism in American Political Life: Communism in American Political Life. Oxford University Press. ISBN 978-0-19-987429-3.
- Radosh, Ronald (31 March 2003). "How the NYT Misled Readers About Communist Herbert Aptheker". History News Network.
