= Aileen Richards =

Welsh businesswomen

Aileen Richards is a Welsh businesswomen, notable for becoming the first woman to join the board of the Welsh Rugby Union in 2015.

She was appointed as President of the London-based Montgomeryshire Society in 2018.

As a businesswoman, she worked for Mars, Incorporated for 30 years, becoming Executive Vice President in 2012.

Richards is a now an independent non-executive director on several boards, including Welsh National Opera.
