= Aili Alliksoo =

Estonian athletics competitor

Aili Alliksoo (since 1980 Aili Kägu; born 9 July 1959) is an Estonian athletics competitor.

She was born in Kiviõli. In 1977 she graduated from Tallinn sport school (TSIK), and 1983 Tallinn Pedagogical Institute in Russian language and literature speciality.

She started her sporting exercising already in Püssi primary school, coached by Enno Osi.

She is multiple-times Estonian champion in different running disciplines. In 1978 and 1982, she won two gold medals at Soviet national sport competitions (Estonian: Nõukogude Liidu maaspordimängud). 1975–1982 she was a member of Estonian national athletics team.

Personal records:

- 100 m: 11.8 (1979).
