= Eileen Andjelkovitch =

British violinist

Eileen Andjelkovitch LRAM
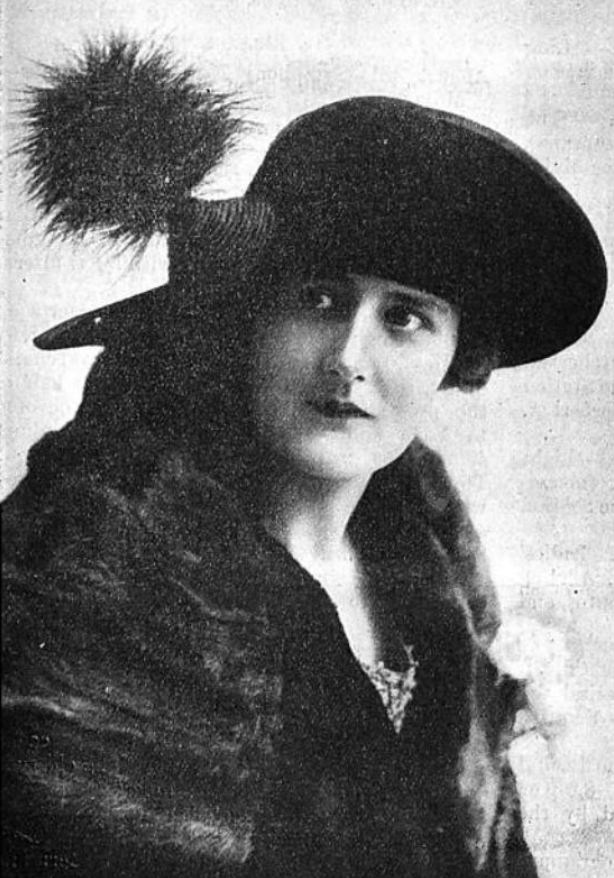
- Eileen Andjelkovitch, from a 1927 publication
- Born: Eileen Constance Smith; 18 March 1896; Ireland
- Died: 15 October 1941 (aged 45); Worthing, England, U.K.
- Other names: Aileen Russell Worby, Eileen C. Tcherniak, Eileen C. Cathie
- Occupation: Violinist
- Spouses: Vidoslav Anđelković, Grisha Tcherniak

Eileen Andjelkovitch (18 March 1896 – 15 October 1941), LRAM, born Eileen Constance Smith, was a British violinist, music educator, and musical director.

== Early life and education ==
She was born in Ireland, the daughter of Frank and Annie Smith. The Smiths lived in Buckinghamshire by 1901. She was adopted by widowed Scottish-born music teacher Anna Alexander Russell Worby, and became known as Eileen Russell Worby. She was usually described as Scottish, and was living in London by 1911. Successful examination by the Royal Academy of Music granted her a license to teach violin in 1923.

== Career ==
As a young woman, she played violin at theatres, and was musical director at the Broadway Gardens Kinema in Walham Green in London.

She became a concert violinist, and gave a concert at London's Aeolian Hall in 1927, and accompanied Welsh baritone Owen Bryngwyn at the same venue in another concert that year. She also made several recordings in the 1920s. "She has an exceptionally rich tone and a great deal of temperament," wrote one reviewer in 1925.

She performed on BBC Radio broadcasts in the 1920s and 1930s. On the London stage, she was musical director of the shows Jane and Genius (1934), The Mask and the Face (1934) and Within the Gates (1934). In 1936, she conducted the King's Theatre Orchestra at a benefit concert in Hammersmith.

She was also known as a music educator. She was principal of the Fulham Central College of Music in 1927; and in 1932 and 1933, she principal of the Modern School of Music on Fulham Road in London.

== Personal life ==
She married a Yugoslavian diplomat, Vidoslav Andjelkovitch, in July 1921. She later married fellow musician Gregori (Grisha) Tcherniak in 1934. She married a third time, to musician George Ernest Cathie. On 15 October 1941, she died at the age of 45 at a nursing home in Worthing.
