= Aileen Mary Elliott =

British artist

- Born: 19 December 1896; Southampton, England
- Died: 1966 (aged 69–70)
- Education: Regent Street Polytechnic; Central School of Arts and Crafts
- Known for: Painting

Aileen Mary Edith Elliott (19 December 1896 – 1966) was a British artist known for her paintings of boats and harbour scenes.

== Biography ==
Elliott was born in Southampton to Jean Alexander Brown (1864–1944) and Walter Pearson Elliott, a timber merchant and company managing director. Aileen Elliott studied at the Regent Street Polytechnic in London and then at Central School of Arts and Crafts, also in London. She produced drawings, etchings and paintings of ships, boats, seascapes and harbour scenes and was a regular exhibitor, between 1922 and 1940, at the Royal Academy and the Royal Scottish Academy, with the Society of Women Artists and took part in exhibitions at the Walker Art Gallery in Liverpool and, from 1930, at the Paris Salon. She was elected a member of the Society of Graphic Art and of the Winchester Art Club. Several of her etchings were reproduced commercially as prints by the Greatorex company. The Victoria and Albert Museum in London holds examples of her marine scenes.

During both World War I and World War II, Elliott served with the Red Cross. For a time she lived in Berkshire and later at Lee-on-Solent.
