= Aileen Eagleton =

British painter and wood engraver (1902–1984)

- Born: 5 February 1902; Bexley, Kent
- Died: 1984 (aged 81–82)
- Known for: Painting, wood engraving

Aileen Eagleton (5 February 1902 – 1984) was a British painter and wood engraver.

== Biography ==
Eagleton was born in Bexley in Kent and studied art in London under Louis Thomson. She was a member of the Society of Graphic Art and exhibited on a regular basis at both the Royal Academy and at the Paris Salon. She also exhibited with the Society of Women Artists, the Royal Institute of Oil Painters and the Royal Institute of Painters in Water Colours. Works by Eagleton were also displayed at the Walker Art Gallery in Liverpool. For many years Eagleton lived at East Molesey in Surrey.
