= Eileen Browne =

Eileen Browne may refer to:

- Eileen Browne (author), English author of the Handa's books
- Eileen Browne (broadcaster) (1923–1999), BBC Radio broadcaster, most notably for Listen with Mother
