= Eileen O'Connell =

Eileen O'Connell may refer to:

- Eileen O'Connell (politician) (1947–2000), Nova Scotia NDP MLA, 1996–2000
- Eibhlín Dubh Ní Chonaill (1743–1800), Irish writer
