= Aileen Thomas =

Canadian fencer (1907–1989)

Personal information
- Born: 3 June 1907
- Died: 26 January 1989 (aged 81)

Sport
- Sport: Fencing

Aileen Thomas (3 June 1907 – 26 January 1989) was a Canadian fencer. She competed in the women's individual foil event at the 1936 Summer Olympics.
