= Aili Vahtrapuu =

Estonian sculptor (1950–2024)

Aili Vahtrapuu (26 January 1950 – 11 December 2024) was an Estonian sculptor.

In 1980 she graduated from the Estonian State Art Institute. In 2007 Vahtrapuu was awarded a PhD by Sorbonne University. Vahtrapuu was a professor at Tallinn University in Estonia in 2009.

Vahtrapuu was a member of Estonian Artists' Union. She died on 11 December 2024, at the age of 74.

== Personal exhibitions ==
- 1993 Palee D’Orsay, Paris, France
- 1996 Draakoni Galerii, Tallinn
- 1996 Rome, Italy
- 1998 Analoog. Linnagalerii, Tallinn
- 1999 (with Jaan Elken), Kotka, Finland
- 1999 Vee Ruum. Tallinn Kunstihoone Galerii, Tallinn
- 2000 Eesti Rooste. Rock al Mare Vabaõhumuuseum, Tallinn
- 2000 Vee Ruum 3. Narva Kunstimuuseum, Narva
- 2001 Friedrich Linnupüüdja. Linnagalerii, Tallinn
- 2001 Passage Nordique. (with Kristiina Kaasik), L’Harmattani Galerii, Paris, France
- 2001/2002 Friedrich Linnupüüdja. Narva Kunstimuuseum, Narva
- 2002 Vee loomise lugu. Raegalerii, Kuressaare
