= Eileen Albrizio =

American writer

- Born: 1963 (age 62–63)
- Occupation: Writer

Eileen Albrizio is an American writer of poetry and prose, a professional proofreader and editor, and a former broadcast journalist. She was born in Hartford, CT where she still resides. Her poetry has appeared in numerous literary publications. She is the author of three print volumes of poetry: Messy on the Inside, Rain – Dark as Water in Winter, and Perennials: New & Selected Poems, all published by Ye Olde Font Shoppe Press. She is a two-time winner of the Greater Hartford Arts Council Fellowship for Poetry. Her book of poetry and short stories "The Box Under the Bed" won the 2015 Paranormal Poetry and Prose Prize. Her debut novel "The Windsome Tree: a ghost story" has received much critical acclaim. Albrizio has taught poetry and creative writing in several colleges and cultural institutions as well as the York Correctional Institute, Connecticut’s only maximum-security prison for women.

In 2005, Albrizio left a twelve-year career as a radio news host and broadcast journalist, where she worked for ABC and NPR News. During her broadcasting career, her newscasts, spot news stories and featured stories were repeatedly awarded first-prize honors from the Associated Press and the Society of Professional Journalists.

Albrizio graduated from the Connecticut School of Broadcasting and then went on to earn her BFA in Theatre from Central Connecticut State University as well as her MA in English from the same university. In addition to writing and teaching, Albrizio assists her husband, Wayne Horgan, who is a Realtor in Connecticut. The two have owned and operated Heroes & Hitters, a comic book store in Rocky Hill, CT, since 1989.

== Selected works ==
=== The Windsome Tree: a ghost story ===
The Windsome Tree: a ghost story is Albrizio's debut novel. Description: There are ghosts in the tree who would kill to get home! Unable to crawl out of her grief after losing her youngest child to leukemia, Mercy Amoretto, mother of four, takes her therapist's advice and starts to clean out the clutter in her life. In the garage, she finds an old tire and rope and, in a fanciful moment, creates a tire swing. Unknown to her, the rope, the tire, and the tree share a violent history. Once they are connected, that history is unleashed in the form of two child spirits from decades past. While on the swing, Mercy begins hearing cryptic messages from the spirits and is quick to believe the voices are key to finding her dead daughter. Hope turns to horror when two of her children appear to taunt her in tortuous ways. And when her children go missing, all eyes turn to Mercy. She's convinced the ghosts are to blame, but how can anyone believe her when she's the only one who hears their voices?

=== The Box Under the Bed ===
The Box Under the Bed is a collection of haunting tales and tidbits pulled from under the bed. These compelling little poems and stories explore the dark side of the human psyche and the ghostly side of life. Winner of the 2015 Paranormal Poetry and Prose Prize.

=== Messy on the Inside ===
Messy on the Inside was published in 1998. Albrizio's first book of poetry, it consists of 60 poems written entirely in formal verse. Utilizing such traditional forms as the English sonnet, pantoum, villanelle, sestina and haiku, this book spotlights Albrizio's ability to master form without losing the poem's accessibility. From the success of this book, Albrizio created an acclaimed formal verse workshop.

=== Rain - Dark as Water in Winter ===
Rain – Dark as Water in Winter was published in 2001. This book consists of a one-act play written in verse and 30 poems written in traditional forms. The play, Rain, was honored by the Writer’s Digest as one of the best written one-act plays of 1997. The two-character play focuses on the cycle of an emotionally abusive relationship between Rain and her lover, Perfidy. The play has a profound iambic rhythm, while the rhyme, although consistently placed, is only subtly heard.

=== Perennials: New & Selected Poems ===
Perennials: New & Selected Poems marks Albrizio’s break from traditional forms. It was published in 2007. Although it includes some of her most well received poems from her previous two books, it also consists of over 30 new poems that are largely written in free verse or in forms of her own creation. She continues to teach poetry workshops, but has since added a segment on applying the rhetorical devices used in formal verse to free-verse writing. The Greater Hartford Arts Council and the New Boston Fund have honored with excellence several free-verse poems that were later included in the first chapter of this book.
