= List of ghosts =

The following is a list of ghosts:

== African folklore ==
- Adze, Ewe vampiric being
- Amadlozi, Nguni spiritual figures
- Asanbosam, Akan vampire
- Egbere, Yoruban malevolent spirit
- Kishi, Angolan two-faced demon
- Madam Koi Koi, Nigerian ghost
- Mbwiri, Central African demon
- Obambo, Central African supernatural being
- Obayifo, Ashanti vampire
- Obia, West African monster
- Ogbanje, Igbo evil spirit
- Tikoloshe, spirit from Zulu cultures
- Zar, Ethiopian demon

== Asian folklore ==
Section of the Hungry Ghosts Scroll depicting one of the thirty-six types of hungry ghosts who constantly seek water to drink, explaining how those born as such are saved by the offerings of the living. Kyoto Museum.

=== East Asia ===
China

- Hungry ghost
- Mogwai
- Vengeful ghost
- Wangliang
- Yaoguai

Korea

- Gwisin
- Korean virgin ghost
- Egg ghost

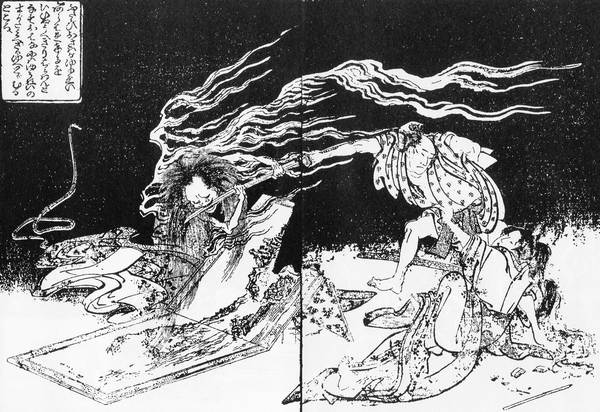
Onryō from the Kinsei-Kaidan-Shimoyonohoshi (近世怪談霜夜星)

Japan

- Ayakashi
- Chōchin-obake
- Dōsojin
- Funayūrei
- Gashadokuro
- Goryō
- Hitodama
- Ikiryō
- Inugami
- Kuchisake-onna
- Mononoke
- Mujina
- Noppera-bō
- Nure-onna
- Obake
- Ochimusha
- Onryō
- Raijū
- Rokurokubi
- Shikigami
- Shinigami
- Shirime
- Shiryō
- Tatarigami
- Tsukumogami
- Ubume
- Umibōzu
- Yōkai
- Yōsei
- Yuki-onna
- Yūrei
- Zashiki-warashi

=== South Asia ===
India

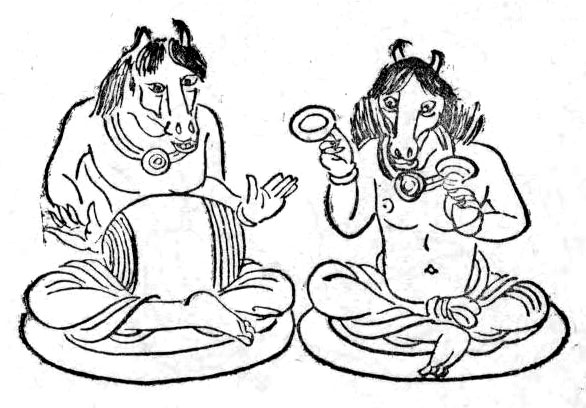
A male kumbhāṇḍa (left) and female Kumbhāṇḍakā (right).

- Aavi
- Brahmarakshasa
- Bhakolwa
- Bhoota (ghost)
- Baak
- Chetkin
- Chedipe
- Chir batti
- Churail
- Chhallava
- Dakini
- Daayan
- Ded futiya
- Jokkho
- Nishi daak
- Naagin
- Nale Ba
- Pishacha
- Preta
- Pūtam
- Shakhchunni
- Shakini
- Skandhakata
- Vetala
- Yakshini

Sri Lanka

- Asura
- Bodilima
- Devil Bird
- Gara yaka
- Holnab
- Kalu Kumara
- Kola Sanni Yaka
- Kumbanda
- Maha Sohona
- Mala preta
- Mara
- Pisacha
- Preta
- Riri yaka
- Suniyam yaka
- Yaksha

Nepal

- Banjhakri and Banjhakrini
- Kichkandi
- Raakebhoot

Pakistan

- Churel
- Pichal Peri
- Bhoot

Bangladesh (Bengal)

- Nishi Dak
- Kana Bhola
- Doityo
- Bhrohmo Doityo
- Rakkhosh/Khokkosh
- Daini/Dainiburi
- Bhoot
  - Mecho Bhoot
  - Mamdo Bhoot
  - Gecho Bhoot
  - Boba Bhoot
- Jinn
- Pret
- Aleya
- Petni/Shakchunni
- Pishach
- Nag/Nagin
- Betal

=== Southeast Asia ===
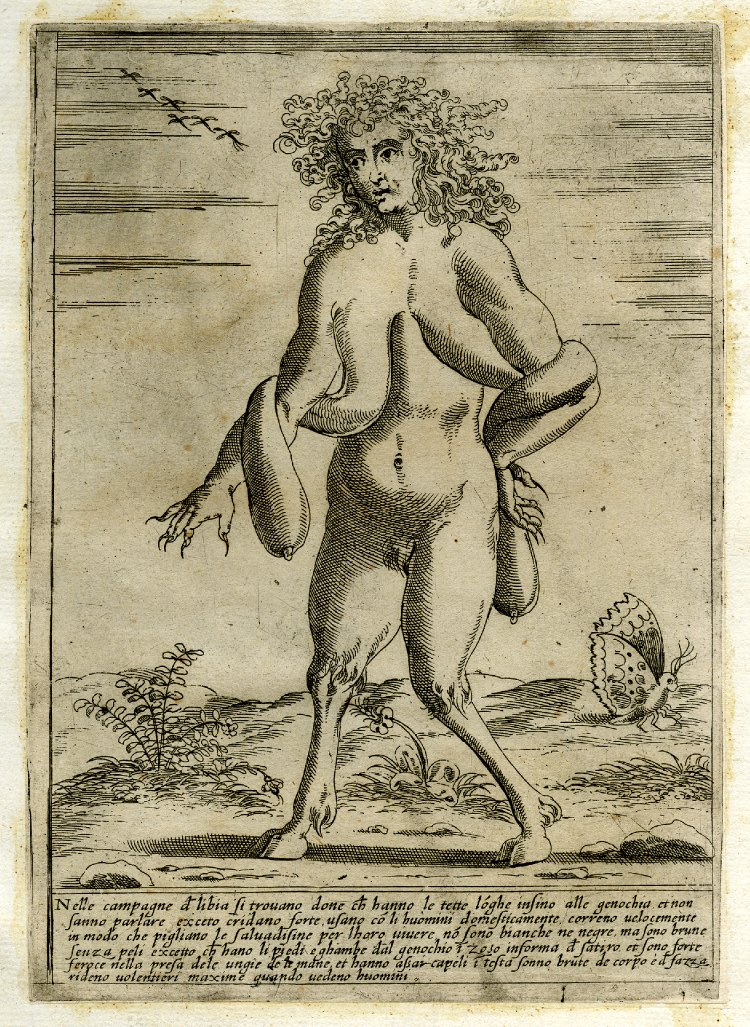
Giovanni Battista de' Cavalieri 1585 depiction of "Monsters from all parts of the ancient and modern world" (Mostri de tute le parti del mondo antichi et moderni). The drawing depicts a Wewe Gombel

Indonesia/Malaysia

- Babi Ngepet
- Hantu Air
- Hantu Bongkok
- Hantu Raya
- Hantu Tinggi
- Jenglot
- Kuntilanak, also called Matianak or Pontianak (folklore)
- Langsuyar
- Leyak
- Orang Bunian
- Orang Minyak
- Pelesit
- Penanggalan
- Pocong
- Sundel bolong
- Toyol
- Wewe Gombel

Myanmar

- Nat
- Peik-ta
- Thayé

Philippines

- Aswang
- Kapre
- Manananggal
- Tiyanak
- Headless priest
- Batibat

Thailand

- Krasue
- Krahang
- Mae Nak
- Nang Takian
- Nang Tani
- Pop
- Phi Pong
- Kong koi
- Kuman Thong

=== West Asian and Central Asian folklore ===
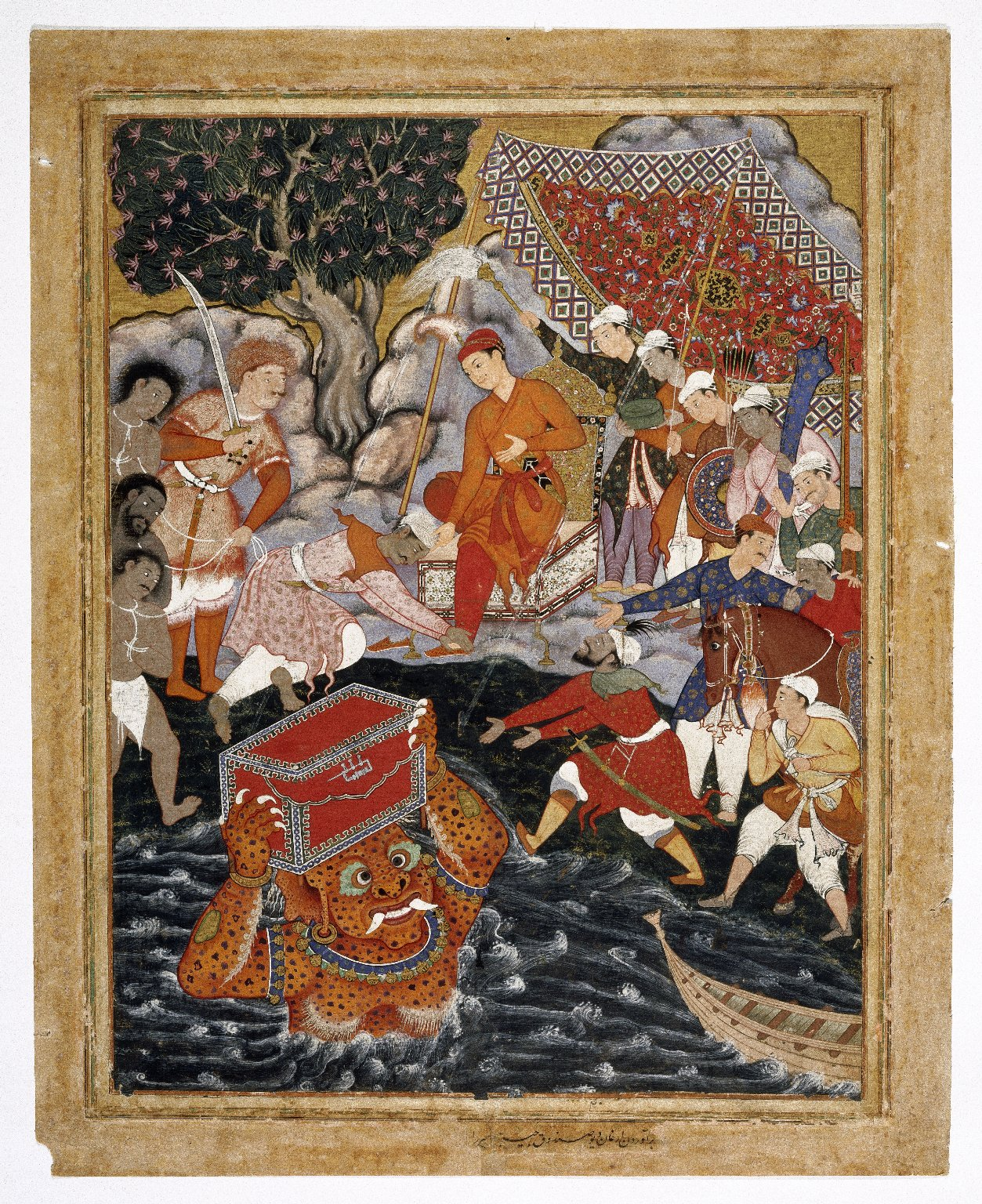
An ifrit named Arghan Div brings the chest of armor to Hamza. The flaming eyes of the ifrit are slightly crossed with orange spotted skin.

Egyptian and Arabic

- Hatif
- Ifrit

Persian

- Div
- Marid

Jewish mythology

- Dybbuk
- Lilin
- Mazzikin

Turkish

- Basty
- Gelin
- Hortdan
- Kormos

== European folklore ==
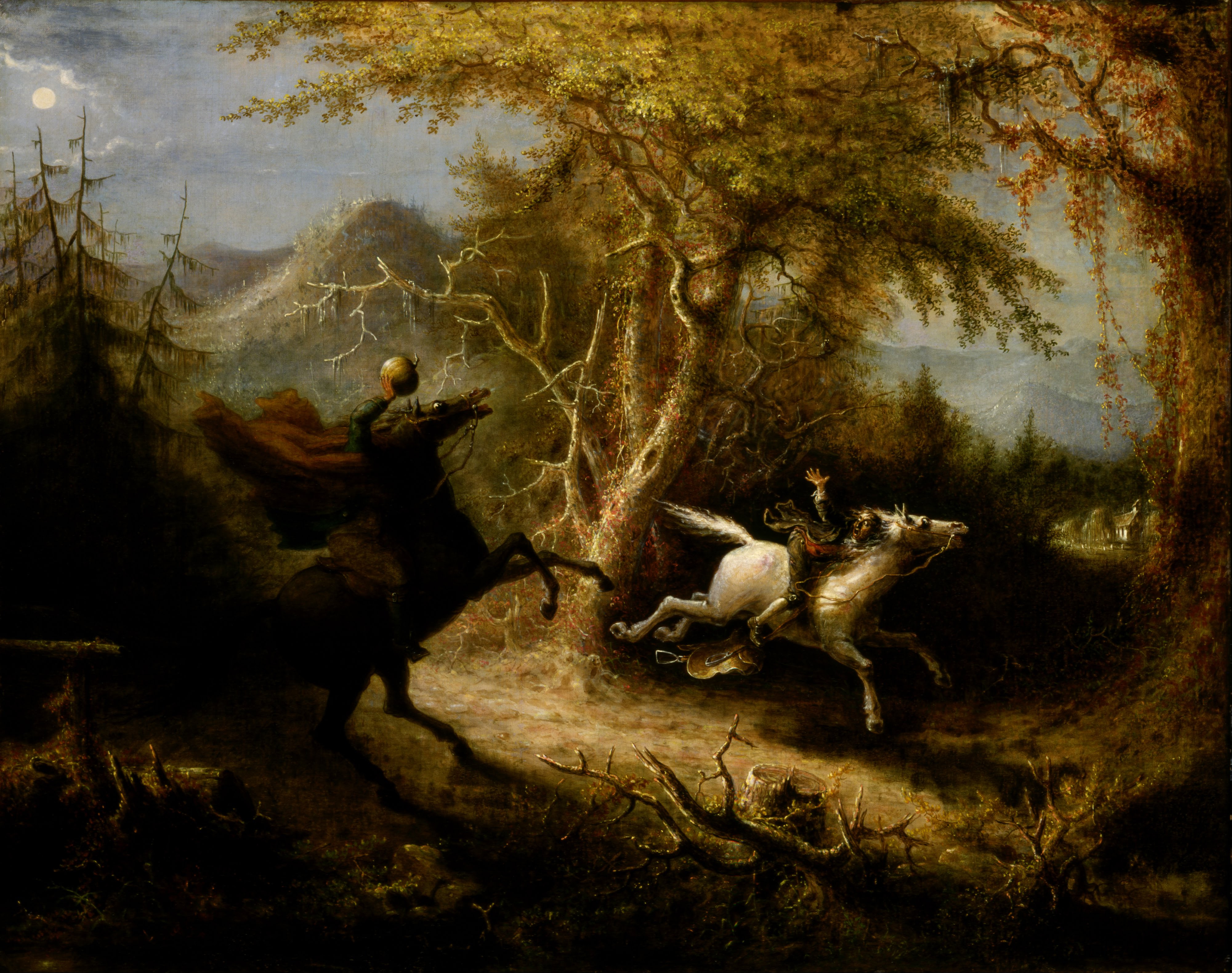
The Headless Horseman Pursuing Ichabod Crane by John Quidor (1801–1881)

- The Headless Horseman
- The Wild Hunt
- White Lady

Albania

- Lugat
- Kukudh

Belgium

- Bloedkoets, a ghostly carriage believed to kidnap children
- Kludde, shapeshifting demon that harassed nightly travelers
- Nekker, waterghosts that appeared around wells, lakes and other bodies of water

Finland

- Grey Lady, believed to haunt the Mustio Manor (Finnish: Mustion linna) in Karis, Raseborg

Germany

- Chopper
- Poltergeist
- Aufhocker
- Wiedergänger
- Nachzehrer
- Klabautermann

Graeco-Roman

- Genius loci
- Shade
- Vrykolakas
- Manes
- Lemures/Larvae

Ireland

- Banshee

Malta

- Black Knight, believed to haunt Fort Manoel
- Blue Lady, believed to haunt Verdala Palace
- Grey Lady, believed to haunt Fort St Angelo
- Katarina, believed to haunt Mdina

Netherlands

- Witte Wieven, benevolent or malicious white female spirits

Romania

- Iele, feminine mythical creatures
- Moroi, a type of vampire or ghost
- Muma Pădurii, an ugly and mean old woman living in the forest
- Pricolici, similar to Strigoi, but for worse souls
- Samca, an evil spirit, said to curse children and pregnant women with illness
- Spiriduş, a domestic spirit/familiar that, when summoned, acts as an intermediate between the devil and the master of the home
- Stafie, spirits of the dead who are bound to a place in which they lived in life; a poltergeist
- Strigoi, troubled souls of the dead rising from the grave
- Vâlvă, feminine nature spirits that control various phenomena. Can be good or bad
- Vântoase, female spirits of the wind
- Zmeu, a fantastic creature

Scandinavia

- Knights of Ålleberg are the ghosts of twelve knights that died in the Battle of Ålleberg in 1389
- Landvættir
- Myling, a child ghost

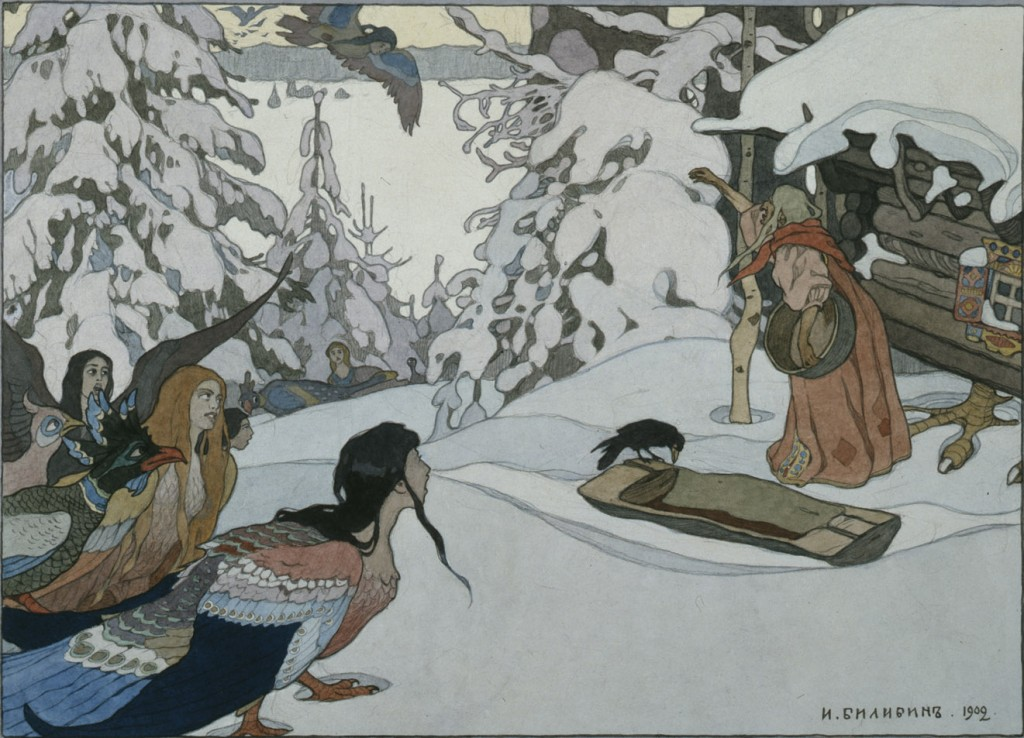
Baba Yaga and Maiden-birds by Ivan Bilibin, 1902

Slavic folklore

- Baba Yaga
- Countess Báthory allegedly haunts her former castle at Čachtice
- Dhampir
- Dvorovoi
- Dziwożona
- Kikimora
- Sava Savanović
- Upiór

Spain

- The ghost of Catalina Lercaro in the Museum of the History of Tenerife
- Santa Compaña

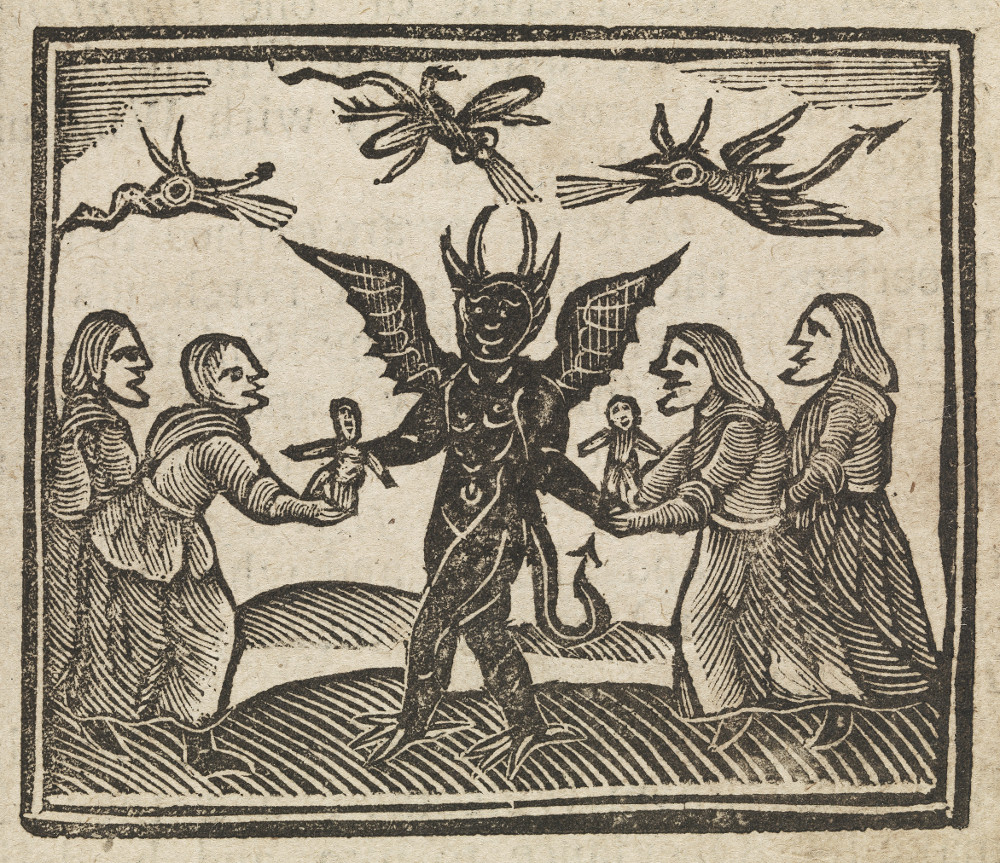
Drawing from the 1591 Agnes Sampson trial, depicting the devil giving witches magic dolls

United Kingdom

- Agnes Sampson, known as Bloody Agnes, believed to haunt Holyrood Palace
- Bloody Mary
- The Brown Lady
- Cock Lane ghost (called "Scratching Fanny") received massive public attention in 18th-century England
- Drummer of Tedworth
- Dullahan, similar to the headless horseman
- The ghost nun of Borley Rectory
- The ghost of Anne Boleyn, reportedly seen at the Tower of London
- Grey Lady, a ghost believed to haunt Glamis Castle
- Man in Grey of the Theatre Royal
- Maria Marten, the ghost of a murderer woman said to have appeared in her stepmother's dreams to show her where her body was hidden.
- Nan Tuck's Ghost, believed to haunt Nan Tuck's Lane, one mile from Buxted
- Sweet William's Ghost

== North American ==
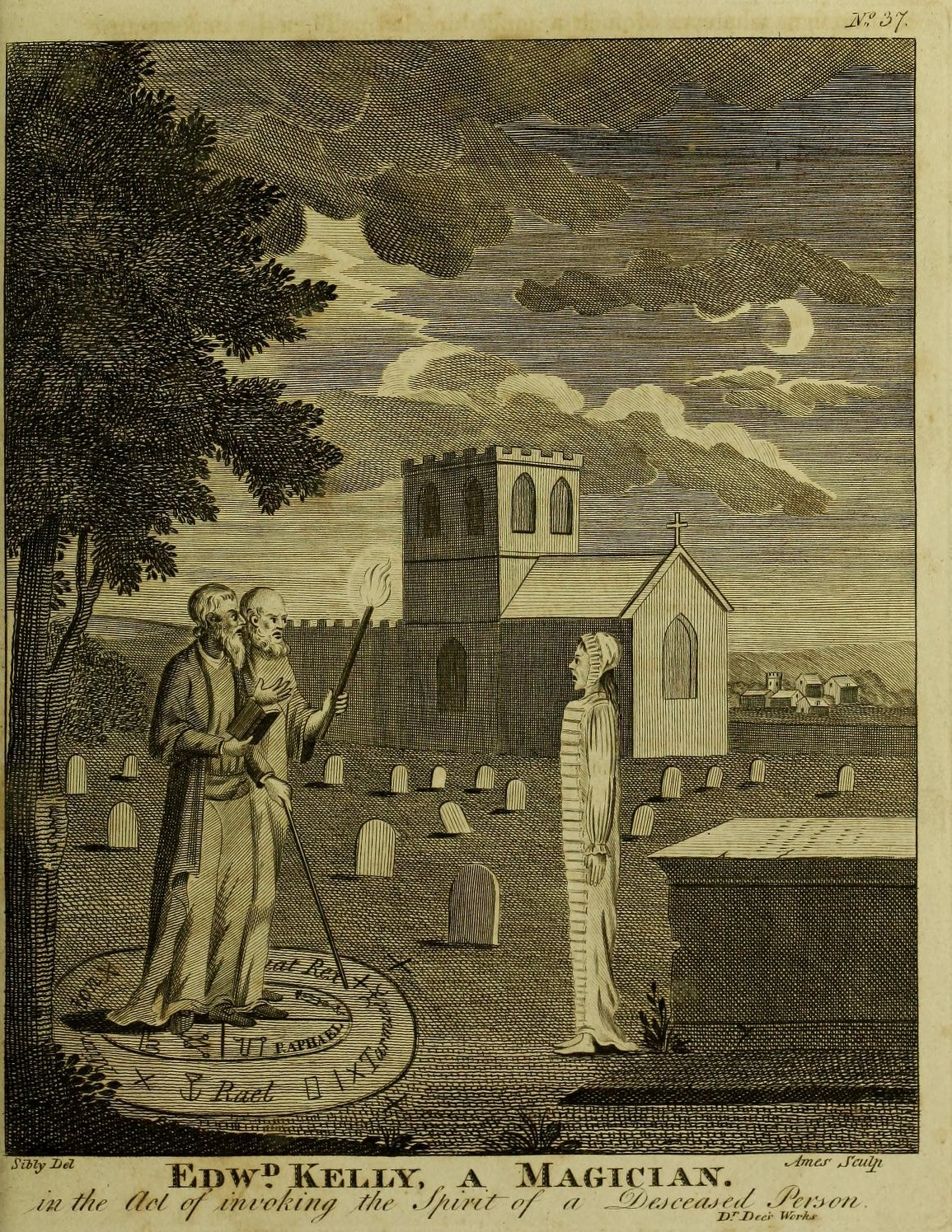
A depiction of John Dee (1527–1608) and Edward Kelley (1555–1597/8) invoking a spirit

Canada

- Aeneas Shaw's daughter, Sophia, allegedly haunts Queenston, Ontario
- Alexander Keith allegedly haunts his brewery in Halifax, Nova Scotia
- Ann Crosby Currier allegedly haunts Watson's Mill in Ottawa, Ontario
- Charles Melville Hays allegedly haunts Château Laurier in Ottawa, Ontario
- The Dungarvon Whooper is a ghost believed to haunt Blackville, New Brunswick
- Emily Carr allegedly haunts James Bay Inn in Victoria, British Columbia
- Francis Nicholson Darke allegedly haunts Darke Hall in Regina, Saskatchewan
- The Headless Nun is a purported ghost believed to haunt French Fort Cove in Nordin, New Brunswick
- Lady in Red, attributed to a jilted lover, prostitute killed in a fit of passion, or woman of vanity
- Minnie Hopkins, wife of Edward Nicholas Hopkins, allegedly haunts Hopkins Dining Parlour in Moose Jaw, Saskatchewan
- Nils von Schoultz allegedly haunts Fort Henry in Kingston, Ontario
- White Lady, a ghost dressed in a white dress or similar garment, reportedly seen in rural areas and associated with local legends of tragedy

Caribbean

- Douen, a mischievous entity associated with pranks and practical jokes
- Duppy, malevolent spirits who bring misfortune and woe on those they set upon
- Hupia, the spirits of deceased people; portrayed as faceless people or in the form of deceased loved ones
- Jumbee, the generic name given to all malevolent entities, including demons and spirits
- Lwa, a Voodoo spirit who acts as an intermediary between humanity and Bondye
- Phantome, an immensely tall spectre, stands at the crossroads on nights of the full moon with his legs wide apart
- Soucouyant, a blood-sucking hag

United States

- The Bell Witch was a poltergeist said to haunt the family of John Bell near the town of Adams, Tennessee in 1817. The spirit was said to have manifested itself as various animals and a disembodied voice and cited Bible scripture. The Bell Witch partly inspired The Blair Witch Project and the events of her story were depicted in the film An American Haunting.
- Emily, the ghost of a young girl who supposedly haunts a covered bridge in Stowe, Vermont. The bridge is dubbed "Emily's Bridge", and she is said to be seen only at midnight
- Oscar Washburn, the ghost of a black goat farmer who allegedly haunts Old Alton Bridge in Copper Canyon, Texas. He is commonly known as "the Goatman" as he is said to appear as a half-human, half-goat-like entity. The bridge has been nicknamed "Goatman's Bridge" by locals as a result of the legend.
- Joe Bush, a legendary ghost that allegedly haunts the Sumpter Valley Gold Dredge in Sumpter, Oregon. He is said to leave wet, bare footprints on the decks of the dredge, cause lights to flicker, and doors to open and close
- The ghost of Resurrection Mary allegedly haunts roads and buildings around Resurrection Cemetery near Justice, Illinois, a suburb of Chicago.
- Ghost of Queen Esther, the ghost of an Iroquois woman who allegedly mourns the massacre of her village in Pennsylvania.
- Ghosts of the American Civil War
- Greenbrier Ghost, the alleged ghost of a young woman in Greenbrier County, West Virginia. In a court trial, the woman's mother claimed that her daughter's ghost told her she had been murdered.
- Kate Morgan, a ghost which is said to haunt the Hotel del Coronado in Coronado, California
- Minnie Quay, a legendary ghost of Michigan
- Old Book is the name given to a ghost or spirit which allegedly haunts a cemetery at Peoria State Hospital in Bartonville, Illinois
- Pedro Benedit Horruytiner, colonial governor of Florida. Alleged encounters with his ghost have been reported there
- President Abraham Lincoln's ghost has been reported in the White House numerous times, many of those by prominent people such as President Theodore Roosevelt, First Lady Grace Coolidge, Queen Wilhelmina of the Netherlands, and Winston Churchill
- The Red Lady of Huntingdon College is a ghost believed to haunt the former Pratt Hall dormitory at Huntingdon College in Montgomery, Alabama
- The Ridgeway Ghost of Wisconsin Folklore is believed to terrorize people along a 25-mile stretch of old mining road
- Slag Pile Annie, a ghost said to appear as an elderly woman working in a remote and hard-to-access location in the former Jones and Laughlin Steel Corporation mill in Pittsburgh, Pennsylvania
- The Wizard Clip was a ghost said to have clipped articles of clothing and visitors' hair at a home in Middleway, WV after a Catholic traveler died there in 1794 without receiving any last rites
- White Lady
- Vanishing hitchhiker

Central America and Mexico

- La Llorona, a ghost of Latin American folklore who is said to have murdered her children
- Sihuanaba, a shapeshifting spirit of Central America who lures men into danger before revealing her face to be that of a horse or a skull
- Headless priest, the spirit of a decapitated priest

== South American folklore ==
- Sayona, a Venezuelan vengeful spirit who appears to unfaithful husbands
- The Silbón, a legendary figure in Colombia and Venezuela, described as a lost soul

== Oceania ==
Australia

- Fisher's ghost - The legend of Fisher's ghost is a popular Australian ghost story or folk tale dating to the early 19th century.
- Flinders Street Station Ghost - The legend of a fisherman's ghost who died from a fishing accident said to inhabit Flinders Street Station in Melbourne, reportedly leaving a puddle of water some nights on Platform 10 where it stands facing the Yarra River.
- Frederick Baker ("Frederick Federici") of Princess Theatre, Melbourne
- Monte Cristo Homestead of Junee, New South Wales; allegedly Australia's most haunted house

Micronesia

- Taotao Mona

== List of reportedly haunted locations ==
- Canada
- Colombia
- France
- India
- Mexico
- Philippines
- Romania
- South Africa
- United Kingdom
  - Scotland
- United States
  - San Francisco
  - Washington DC

== Ghosts by culture ==
=== Asia ===
- India
- Chinese
- Korea
- Japan
- Vietnam
- Thai
- Malay
- Filipino
- Bengali
- Sri Lanka

=== Others ===
- English speaking cultures
- Mesopotamian
- Mexico
- Polynesian
- Maori

== Popular culture ==
=== Television and film ===
- Annie Sawyer and Alex Millar from the television series Being Human, and Matt Bolton from the spin-off Becoming Human
- Casper the Friendly Ghost and his uncles, the Ghostly Trio also known as of Fatso, Stinky, and Stretch
- The Lady, a human-ghost in the television series The Clifton House Mystery
- Danny, a human-ghost hybrid child from Nickelodeon's animated TV series, Danny Phantom.
- The Dead Men of Dunharrow in J.R.R. Tolkien's The Lord of the Rings. Also, the Nazgûl in the same work; nine former men resurrected as wraiths to do Sauron's bidding
- The Flying Dutchman, a pirate ghost from SpongeBob SquarePants
- Ghosts (2019 TV Series) includes the Captain, Mary, Robin, Kitty, Thomas Thorne, Julian Fawcett, Lady Fanny Button, Pat Butcher, and Humphrey
- The Ghosts of Motley Hall includes Bodkin, Sir George Uproar, Sir Francis 'Fanny' Uproar, Matt and the White Lady
- The Grudge: Kayako Saeki, the onryo, and her homicidal husband Takeo Saeki, the evil yurei
- Harry Potter series:

- The Bloody Baron
- The Fat Friar
- The Grey Lady
- Moaning Myrtle
- Professor Cuthbert Binns
- Sir Nicholas de Mimsy-Porpington, aka Nearly Headless Nick
- Sir Patrick Delaney-Podmore

- Lonesome Ghosts from the Mickey Mouse series
- Penny Halliwell, Patricia "Patty" Halliwell from Charmed
- Barbie creator Ruth Handler appears as a ghost in the 2023 film Barbie
- Scratch and several others from the Disney animated series The Ghost and Molly McGee
- Slimer from Ghostbusters and its sequel
- Spectra Vondergeist, daughter of the ghosts from Monster High

=== Comics ===
- Deadman (DC Comics): Boston Brand was originally a trapeze artist who assumed the mantle of Deadman as part of his performances, donning a red costume and white body paint. After Brand is murdered by the Hook, his spirit is empowered by the goddess Rama Kushna, who gives him the ability to possess any living being to assist him in finding his murderer and bringing justice.
- Gay Ghost (DC Comics): The Gay Ghost was originally an 18th-century Irish earl named Keith Everet who was killed by three footpads while traveling to propose to his lover, Deborah Wallace. Everet's three killers are swiftly captured and executed, but Deborah dies of a broken heart shortly afterward. Following his death, the spirits of Everet's ancestors manage to keep his spirit on the mortal plane. However, Everet remains in an incorporeal form until the 1940s, when he manages to possess Mike Collins, the fiancé of Deborah Wallace's descendant.
- Gentleman Ghost (DC Comics): Gentleman Ghost (Jim Craddock) originates from the 19th century and is a notorious highwayman and robber known as "Gentleman Jim". After being killed by Nighthawk, Craddock learns that he is unable to leave the mortal plane until his killer dies as well. However, he is unable to do so as Nighthawk is an incarnation of Hawkman, who is cursed to continually reincarnate.
- Ghost (Dark Horse Comics): The main protagonist of her series, Elisa Cameron, is an assassin with the ability to become invisible and intangible. Due to having her memories erased, Cameron believes herself to be a ghost.
- Homer the Happy Ghost (Atlas Comics)
- Red Ghost (Marvel Comics): A supervillain and enemy of the Fantastic Four who derives his codename from his ability to become invisible and intangible, resembling a ghost.
- Spooky the Tuff Little Ghost, a comic book and animation ghost related to Casper
- Timmy the Timid Ghost, a comic book ghost

=== Literature ===
- Rudrayamala Tantra, Kaulajnananirnaya): Discuss various spirits, their invocation, and control for spiritual or worldly purposes.
- Vetala Panchavimshati is a collection of tales and legends within a frame story, from India. Internationally, it is also known as Vikram-Vetala.
- "Pretasiddhanta": Treatises on preta (ghosts) and ways to liberate them. No authentic copy available.
- "Vetala Tantra": Focused on controlling spirits like vetalas.
- Banquo from William Shakespeare's 1606 play Macbeth
- The Canterville Ghost of Oscar Wilde's popular 1887 short story of the same name
- Captain Daniel Gregg, a sea captain from the 1945 novel, The Ghost of Captain Gregg and Mrs. Muir, later adapted into a 1947 film and 1968–1970 television series
- Charles Dickens' 1843 novel A Christmas Carol which includes Jacob Marley, The Ghost of Christmas Past, Ghost of Christmas Present, and The Ghost Of Christmas Future
- Emily, a ghost from the single volume graphic novel Anya's Ghost by Vera Brosgol
- The Flying Dutchman, originally from A Voyage to Botany Bay (1795) by George Barrington
- Hamlet's father from William Shakespeare's play Hamlet
- Hugh Crain from the 1959 novel The Haunting of Hill House, its 1963 film adaption and the 1999 remake
- The Little Ghost Godfrey a Swedish children's book character
- Marion and George Kerby, ghosts who haunt Cosmo Topper in the two novels by Thorne Smith, the film Topper and its sequels Topper Takes a Trip and Topper Returns, and the television series Topper

=== Video games ===
- Boo (formerly Boo Diddley) and King Boo, an enemy in the Mario series of games
- LeChuck of the series of graphic adventure games Monkey Island
- Pac-Man's ghosts Blinky (red), Pinky (pink), Inky (blue), and Clyde (orange), and Sue
- Hisako, playable Onryō in the fighting game, Killer Instinct
- Gastly, Haunter, and Gengar, an evolutionary line of Ghost-type Pokémon in the Pokémon franchise

== See also ==
- Fear of ghosts
- Ghost films
- Ghost hunting
- Ghost ships
- Ghost stories
- Ghost trains
- Haunted houses
- Poltergeist
