= Green Lady =

Green Lady may refer to:

- Chinese Girl, a painting by Vladimir Tretchikoff
- Lady of the Green Kirtle, the main villain in C.S. Lewis's book The Silver Chair
- Elizabeth Eaton Rosenthal, nicknamed the "Green Lady of Brooklyn"

== Legends ==
- Green Lady of Fyvie, a ghost that supposedly wanders the corridors of Fyvie Castle in Aberdeenshire, Scotland
- Green Lady of Ashintully Castle in the county of Perthshire, Scotland
- Green Lady of Ballindalloch Castle in the Moray region of Scotland
- Green Lady of the Barony of Ladyland in North Ayrshire, Scotland
- Green Lady of Crathes Castle in Aberdeenshire, Scotland
- Green Lady of Knock Castle (Isle of Skye)
- Green Lady of Longleat in Somerset, South West England
- The Green Lady (Hawaii), a female ghost haunting the gulch of Wahiawa, Oahu

== See also ==
- Glaistig
- Reportedly haunted locations in Scotland
