= Minnie Quay =

American ghost

Creature information
- Grouping: Ghosts
- Sub grouping: Legendary Ghosts
- Family: James Quay (father); Mary Ann Quay (mother)

Origin
- Country: United States
- Region: Forester Township
- Habitat: Beaches of Forester
- Occupation: Former student
- Movement: Romanticism
- Partner(s): Unknown young sailor pre- sumably merchant by sea

Mary Jane "Minnie" Quay (1860 - 1876) is an apparition who has been of keen interest to the paranormal circles of Michigan. The legend stems from a small foresting town in the eastern region of Michigan, known as The Thumb, called Forester, in present-day Forester Township.

The stories from old people in the area say you must leave something on her headstone or she will follow you home. Most people leave coins.

== Legend ==
The Quay family, father James and mother Mary Ann, lived in the busy lumbering town of Forester. Their daughter, Minnie Quay, was only 15 at the time. She had given her heart to a young sailor whose ship would dock in Forester often for either shipping or merchant reasons. Not much is known about the gentleman, only that Minnie had fallen in love with him. Many in town warned her about this affair. Her own mother would often yell out loud enough for others in town to hear that she would rather see her dead than with this man. In the early spring of 1876, word came back to Forester that his ship had gone down in the Great Lakes of Michigan. Minnie was torn, as her parents had not allowed her to say goodbye the last time he had left town. A few days later, on April 27, her parents gave her charge to watch her younger brother, James Jr. As the child was sleeping, Minnie walked into town, and passed by the town inn, the Tanner House. People sitting on the porch waved to the young girl as she passed them and walked to the pier. The onlookers watched as she jumped off the pier, into the waters of Lake Huron.

Her ghost has been said to roam the beaches of Forester. Some have said that she just walks, waiting for her lover to dock, while others have stated that she has tried to beckon young girls into the waters to their deaths.

== Forester ==
To the north of Port Sanilac, the cemetery and a few buildings remain. There also exists a tavern (Ray And Connie's Forester Inn), as well as the Tanner Inn. The 150-year-old Tanner Inn has been renovated and is being used a residence years after its use as an inn, a blind pig, and a house of prostitution.

Year-round residents of the area number around 40. In the summer months the population increases, and local campgrounds are full. Many also visit this area in search of the ghost of Minnie Quay.

== See also ==
- List of ghosts
