= Slag Pile Annie =

Alleged ghost in Pittsburgh, Pennsylvania

Slag Pile Annie is the name of a ghost reputed to haunt the former Jones and Laughlin Steel Corporation mill in Pittsburgh, Pennsylvania. According to the story, she appeared as a rough-looking woman wearing a red bandana, working or just standing in a remote and hard-to-access part of the mill. The steelworkers who warned her of danger did not know she was a ghost, until she replied, "I can't get killed, I'm already dead."

The tale may have developed from the true experiences of women working dangerous jobs in the Pittsburgh steel mills during World War II.

== See also ==
- List of ghosts
