= Ridgeway Ghost =

Ghost of folklore in Wisconsin, U.S.

The Ridgeway Ghost is a ghost in Wisconsin folklore.

== Legend ==
According to legend, the Ridgeway Ghost is not only a ghost, but a “phantom that could change its appearance at will.” Anecdotes include people claiming to have seen the ghost of a man with a whip, walking with them or chasing them, domestic animals such as dogs, sheep or other farm animals, and various human forms, “including a headless horseman,” and a young or old woman.

Regional folklore holds that the Ridgeway Ghost is a combination of two brothers who had the misfortune to be murdered as a result of a bar brawl sometime in the early 1840s and was sighted anywhere from the village of Blue Mounds to the town of Dodgeville in Iowa County, Wisconsin a 25-mile stretch of old mining road, since the 1840s. Sightings of the “Ridgeway Ghost” supposedly escalate in cycles about every 40 years, starting in the 1850s and occurring more frequently again in the 1890s, the 1930s and the 1970s. According to the tale, Dr. Cutler of Dodgeville was the first to announce seeing the Ridgeway phantom, claiming that it appeared on the pole of his wagon as he was riding home one night past the house of the deceased. A man named John Lewis who claimed that some “supernatural agency” was the cause of his ailments is said to have died as a result of seeing the Ridgeway Ghost, as are other unnamed individuals.

== See also ==
- List of ghosts
