= Ghosts in English-speaking cultures =

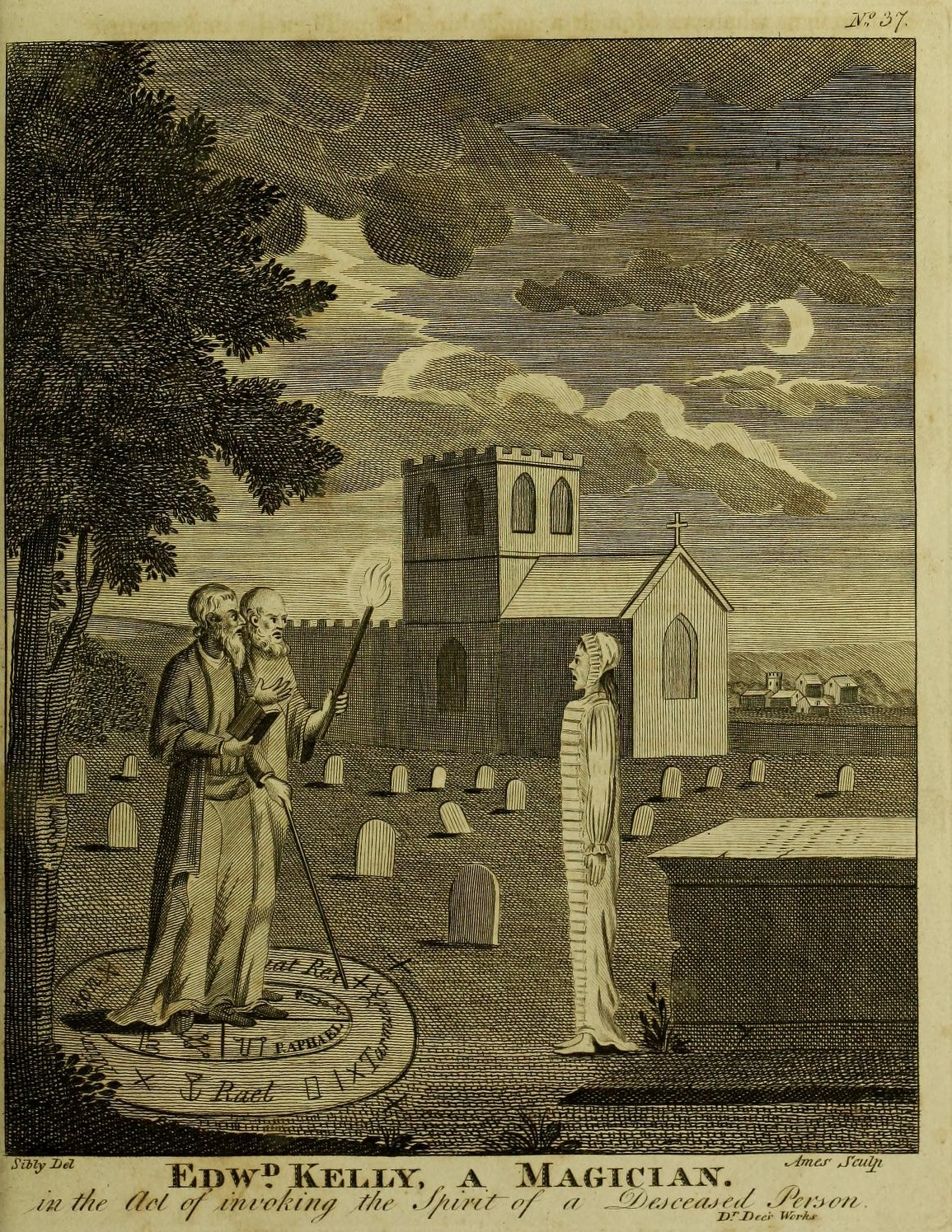
John Dee and Edward Kelley invoking the spirit of a deceased person (engraving from the Astrology by Ebenezer Sibly, 1806).

There is widespread belief in ghosts in English-speaking cultures, where ghosts are manifestations of the spirits of the dead. The beliefs may date back to animism or ancestor worship before Christianization. The concept is a perennial theme in the literature and arts of English-speaking countries.

== Terminology ==
The English word ghost continues Old English gāst, from a hypothetical Common Germanic *gaistaz. It is common to West Germanic, but lacking in North and East Germanic (the equivalent word in Gothic is ahma, Old Norse has andi m., önd f.). The pre-Germanic form was *ghoisdo-s, apparently from a root denoting "fury, anger" reflected in Old Norse geisa "to rage." The Germanic word is recorded as masculine only, but likely continues a neuter s-stem. The original meaning of the Germanic word would thus have been an animating principle of the mind, in particular capable of excitation and fury (compare óðr). In Germanic paganism, "Germanic Mercury," and the later Odin, was at the same time the conductor of the dead and the "lord of fury" leading the Wild Hunt.

Besides denoting the human spirit or soul, of both the living and the deceased, the Old English word is used as a synonym of Latin spiritus, also in the meaning of "breath, blast" from the earliest attestations (9th century). It could also denote any good or evil spirit, such as angels and demons; the Anglo-Saxon Gospel (Matthew 12:43) refers to demonic possession with the words se unclæna gast. Also from the Old English period, the word could denote the spirit of God, i.e.. the "Holy Ghost."

The now prevailing sense of "the soul of a deceased person, spoken of as appearing in a visible form" only emerges in Middle English (14th century). The modern noun does, however, retain a wider field of application, on one hand extending to soul, spirit, vital principle, mind or psyche, the seat of feeling, thought and moral judgement; on the other hand used figuratively of any shadowy outline, fuzzy or unsubstantial image, in optics, photography and cinematography especially a flare, secondary image or spurious signal.

The synonym spook is a Dutch loanword, akin to Low German spôk (of uncertain etymology); it entered the English language via the United States in the 19th century. Alternative words in modern usage include spectre (from Latin spectrum), the Scottish wraith (of obscure origin), phantom (via French ultimately from Greek phantasma, compare fantasy) and apparition. The term shade in classical mythology translates Greek σκιά, or Latin umbra, in reference to the notion of spirits in the Greek underworld. Haint is a synonym for ghost used in regional English of the southern United States, and the "haint tale" is a common feature of southern oral and literary tradition. The term poltergeist is a German word, literally a "noisy ghost", for a spirit said to manifest itself by invisibly moving and influencing objects.

Wraith is a Scots word for "ghost, spectre, apparition". It came to be used in Scottish Romanticist literature, and acquired the more general or figurative sense of "portent, omen." In 18th- to 19th-century Scottish literature, it was also applied to aquatic spirits. The word has no commonly accepted etymology; OED notes "of obscure origin" only. An association with the verb writhe was the etymology favored by J. R. R. Tolkien. Tolkien's use of the word in the naming of the creatures known as the Ringwraiths has influenced later usage in fantasy literature. Bogey or bogy/bogie is a term for a ghost, and appears in Scottish poet John Mayne's Hallowe'en in 1780.

A revenant is a deceased person returning from the dead to haunt the living, either as a disembodied ghost or alternatively as an animated ("undead") corpse. Also related is the concept of a fetch, the visible ghost or spirit of a person yet alive.

== Ghosts in English tradition ==
=== Middle Ages ===
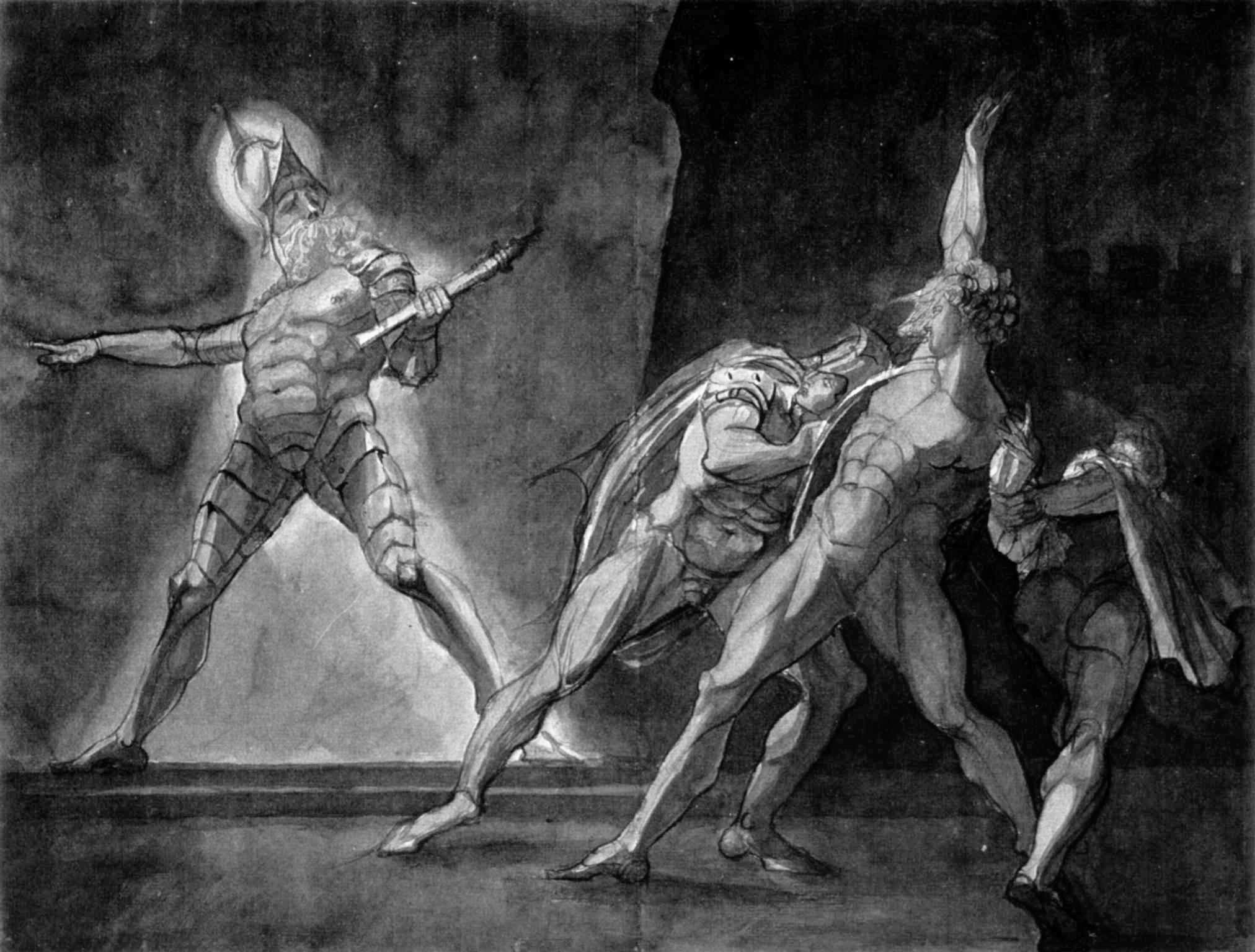
"Hamlet and his father's ghost" by Henry Fuseli (1780s drawing). The ghost is wearing stylized plate armour in 17th century style, including a morion type helmet and tassets. Depicting ghosts as wearing armour, to suggest a sense of antiquity, was common in Elizabethan theater.

Ghosts in medieval England were more substantial than ghosts described in the Victorian era, and there are accounts of a ghost being wrestled with and physically restrained until a priest could arrive to hear its confession. Some were less solid, and could move through walls. Often they were described as paler and sadder versions of the person they had been while alive, and dressed in tattered gray rags. The vast majority of reported sightings were male.

Ghosts could also appear in other forms, more symbolic than direct representations of the person as they appeared in life. In one instance the ghost of a man appears as a great crow that gives off "scattered sparks of fire" from its sides. Stranger still, another ghost in the same collection of Medieval stories manifests as "a rolling bale of hay, with a light glowing from its centre." In both instances the ghosts are those common men, come to plead for services to be read in their names. These more symbolic ghosts would largely fall out of common usage by the Tudor period.

There were some reported cases of ghostly armies, fighting battles at night in the forest, or in the remains of an Iron Age hillfort, as at Wandlebury, near Cambridge, England. Living knights were sometimes challenged to single combat by phantom knights, which vanished when defeated.

=== Tudor period ===
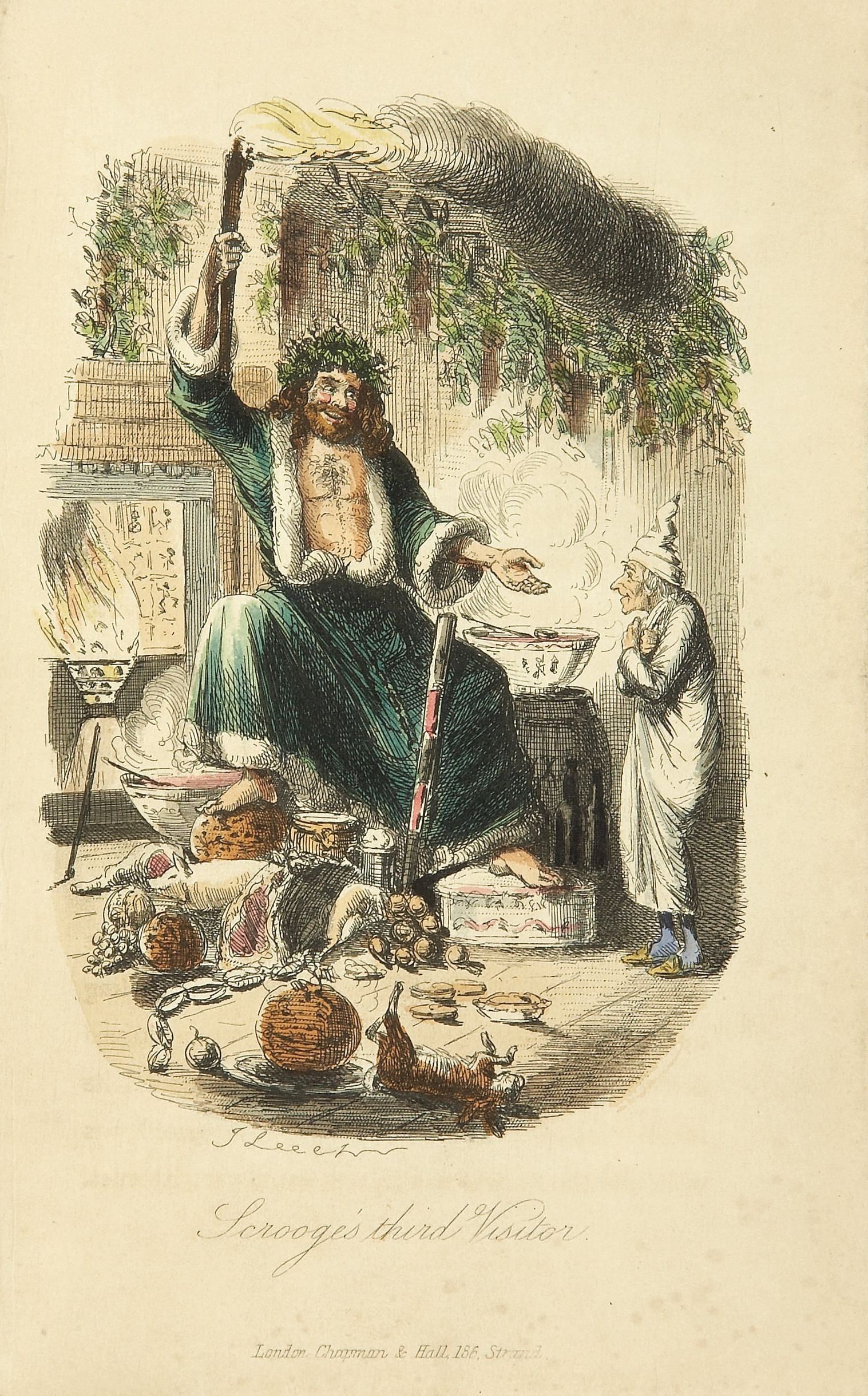
19th century etching by John Leech of the Ghost of Christmas Present as depicted in Charles Dickens' A Christmas Carol

One of the more recognizable ghosts in English literature is the shade of Hamlet's murdered father in Shakespeare's The Tragical History of Hamlet, Prince of Denmark. In Hamlet, it is the ghost who demands that Prince Hamlet investigate his "murder most foul" and seek revenge upon his usurping uncle, King Claudius. In Shakespeare's Macbeth, the murdered Banquo returns as a ghost to the dismay of the title character.

In English Renaissance theater, ghosts were often depicted in the garb of the living and even in armor, as with the ghost of Hamlet's father. Armor, being out of date by the time of the Renaissance, gave the stage ghost a sense of antiquity. But the sheeted ghost began to gain ground on stage in the 19th century because an armored ghost could not satisfactorily convey the requisite spookiness: it clanked and creaked, and had to be moved about by complicated pulley systems or elevators. These clanking ghosts being hoisted about the stage became objects of ridicule as they became clichéd stage elements. Ann Jones and Peter Stallybrass, in Renaissance Clothing and the Materials of Memory, point out, “In fact, it is as laughter increasingly threatens the Ghost that he starts to be staged not in armor but in some form of 'spirit drapery'.” An interesting observation by Jones and Stallybrass is that

...at the historical point at which ghosts themselves become increasingly implausible, at least to an educated elite, to believe in them at all it seems to be necessary to assert their immateriality, their invisibility. ... The drapery of ghosts must now, indeed, be as spiritual as the ghosts themselves. This is a striking departure both from the ghosts of the Renaissance stage and from the Greek and Roman theatrical ghosts upon which that stage drew. The most prominent feature of Renaissance ghosts is precisely their gross materiality. They appear to us conspicuously clothed.

=== Stuart and Georgian periods ===
Ghosts figured prominently in traditional British ballads of the 16th and 17th centuries, particularly the “Border ballads” of the turbulent border country between England and Scotland. Ballads of this type include The Unquiet Grave, The Wife of Usher's Well, and Sweet William's Ghost, which feature the recurring theme of returning dead lovers or children. In the ballad King Henry, a particularly ravenous ghost devours the king's horse and hounds before forcing the king into bed. The king then awakens to find the ghost transformed into a beautiful woman.

One of the key early appearances by ghosts in a gothic tale was The Castle of Otranto by Horace Walpole in 1764.

Washington Irving's short story The Legend of Sleepy Hollow (1820), based on an earlier German folktale, features a Headless Horseman. It has been adapted for film and television many times, such as Sleepy Hollow, a successful 1999 feature film.

=== Victorian and Edwardian periods (c. 1840 to c. 1920) ===
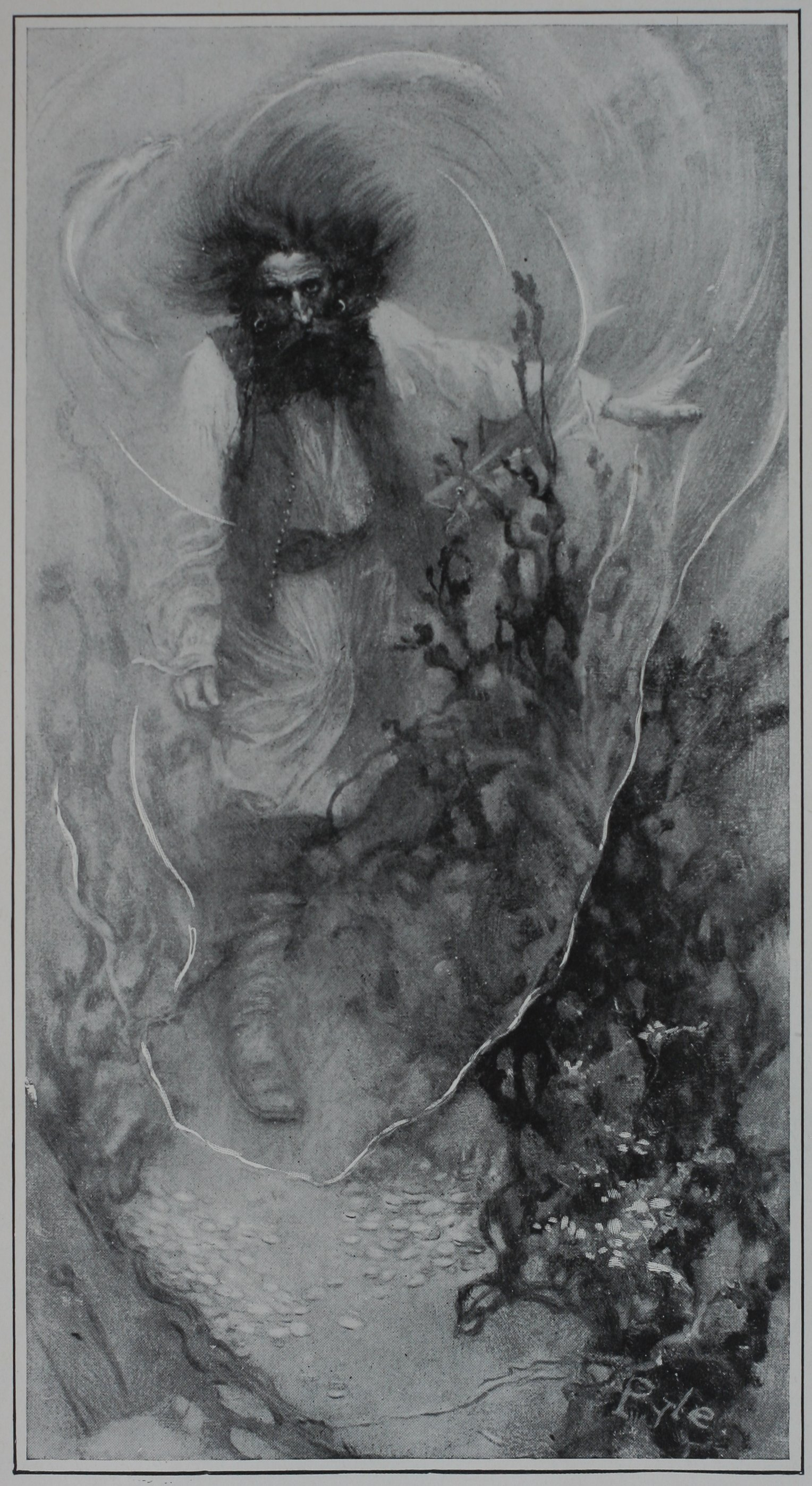
The ghost of a pirate, from Howard Pyle's Book of Pirates (1903).

The "classic" ghost story arose during the Victorian period, and included authors such as M. R. James, Sheridan Le Fanu, Violet Hunt, and Henry James. Classic ghost stories were influenced by the gothic fiction tradition, and contain elements of folklore and psychology. M. R. James summed up the essential elements of a ghost story as, “Malevolence and terror, the glare of evil faces, ‘the stony grin of unearthly malice', pursuing forms in darkness, and 'long-drawn, distant screams', are all in place, and so is a modicum of blood, shed with deliberation and carefully husbanded...”

Famous literary apparitions from this period are the ghosts of A Christmas Carol, in which Ebenezer Scrooge is helped to see the error of his ways by the ghost of his former colleague Jacob Marley, and the ghosts of Christmas Past, Christmas Present and Christmas Yet to Come.

Oscar Wilde's comedy The Canterville Ghost has been adapted for film and television on several occasions. Henry James's The Turn of the Screw has also appeared in a number of adaptations, notably the film The Innocents, Benjamin Britten's opera The Turn of the Screw and the Netflix miniseries The Haunting of Bly Manor.

Oscar Telgmann's opera Leo, the Royal Cadet (1885) includes Judge's Song about a ghost at the Royal Military College of Canada in Kingston, Ontario.

In the United States, prior to and during the First World War, folklorists Olive Dame Campbell and Cecil Sharp collected ballads from the people of the Appalachian Mountains, which included ghostly themes such as The Wife of Usher's Well, The Suffolk Miracle, The Unquiet Grave, and The Cruel Ship's Carpenter. The theme of these ballads was often the return of a dead lover. These songs were variants of traditional Anglo-Scottish ballads handed down by generations of mountaineers descended from the people of the Anglo-Scottish border region.

The Child ballad Sweet William's Ghost (1868) recounts the story of a ghost returning to beg a woman to free him from his promise to marry her, as he obviously cannot being dead. Her refusal would mean his damnation. This reflects a popular British belief that the dead haunted their lovers if they took up with a new love without some formal release. The Unquiet Grave expresses a belief found in various locations over Europe: ghosts can stem from the excessive grief of the living, whose mourning interferes with the dead's peaceful rest.

=== Modern Era (1920 to 1970) ===
Professional parapsychologists and "ghost hunters", such as Harry Price, active in the 1920s and 1930s, and Peter Underwood, active in the 1940s and 1950s, published accounts of their experiences with ostensibly true ghost stories such as Price's The Most Haunted House in England, and Underwood's Ghosts of Borley.

Children's benevolent ghost stories became popular, such as Casper the Friendly Ghost, created in the 1930s and appearing in comics, animated cartoons, and eventually a 1995 feature film.

Noël Coward's play Blithe Spirit, later made into a film, places a more humorous slant on the phenomenon of haunting of individuals and specific locations.

With the advent of motion pictures and television, screen depictions of ghosts became common, and spanned a variety of genres; the works of Shakespeare, Dickens and Wilde have all been made into cinematic versions. Novel-length tales have been difficult to adapt to cinema, although that of The Haunting of Hill House to The Haunting in 1963 is an exception.

Sentimental depictions during this period were more popular in cinema than horror, and include the 1947 film The Ghost and Mrs. Muir, which was later adapted to television with a successful 1968–70 TV series. Genuine psychological horror films from this period include 1944's The Uninvited, and 1945's Dead of Night.

=== Post-modern (1970–present) ===
The 1970s saw English-language screen depictions of ghosts diverge into distinct genres of the romantic and horror. A common theme in the romantic genre from this period is the ghost as a benign guide or messenger, often with unfinished business, such as 1989's Field of Dreams, the 1990 film Ghost, and the 1993 comedy Heart and Souls. In the horror genre, 1980's The Fog, and the A Nightmare on Elm Street series of films from the 1980s and 1990s are notable examples of the trend for the merging of ghost stories with scenes of physical violence.

Popularised in such films as the 1984 comedy Ghostbusters, ghost hunting became a hobby for many who formed ghost hunting societies to explore reportedly haunted places. The ghost hunting theme has been featured in reality television series, such as Ghost Adventures, Ghost Hunters, Ghost Hunters International, Ghost Lab, Most Haunted and A Haunting. It is also represented in children's television by such programs as The Ghost Hunter and Ghost Trackers. Ghost hunting also gave rise to multiple guidebooks to haunted locations, and ghost hunting "how-to" manuals.

The 1990s saw a return to classic "gothic" ghosts, whose dangers were more psychological than physical. Examples of films from this period include 1999's The Sixth Sense and 2001's The Others.

According to the Gallup Poll News Service, belief in haunted houses, ghosts, communication with the dead, and witches had an especially steep increase over the 1990s in the United States. A 2005 Gallup poll found that about 32 percent of Americans believe in ghosts.

== See also ==
- Airmont, New York
- Anne Boleyn
- Art Bell
- Bachelor's Grove Cemetery
- Ballindalloch Castle
- Beetlejuice
- Bettiscombe
- Borley Rectory
- Carbisdale Castle
- Chillingham Castle
- Coronado, California
- Daniel Gould Fowle
- Duppy
- Ewenny
- Firbeck
- Flying Dutchman
- Foulksrath Castle
- Frederick Hamilton-Temple-Blackwood, 1st Marquess of Dufferin and Ava
- Gentleman Ghost
- Ghost films
- Ghost stories
- Ghostbusters
- Glendon College
- Halloween
- Halloween costume
- Hamlet (1948 film)
- Herne the Hunter
- Hull House
- Huntingdon College
- Ichabod Crane
- Jingling Geordie's Hole
- John Zaffis
- Jonesborough, Tennessee
- Kate Morgan
- King's Head Inn, Aylesbury
- Kilmory Castle
- Lake Como (Minnesota)
- Lilith (novel)
- List of reportedly haunted locations in the world
- Luzerne County, Pennsylvania
- Minsden Chapel
- Over, South Gloucestershire
- Paranormal romance
- Parapsychology
- Poltergeist (film series)
- Quatermass and the Pit
- Raynham Hall
- Slapton, Buckinghamshire
- Spring-heeled Jack
- Springhill House
- St Mark's Eve
- The Ghost and Mrs. Muir
- The Legend of Sleepy Hollow
- The Wife of Usher's Well
- Theatre Royal, Drury Lane
- Torre Abbey
- Undead
- Wakefield Kirkgate railway station
- Wallins Creek, Kentucky
- Watson's Mill
- Will-o'-the-wisp
