= Old Book =

American ghost

Old Book is the name given to a purported ghost or spirit that haunts a cemetery and tree on the grounds of the Peoria State Hospital in Bartonville, Illinois. While rumors of ghosts and ghost stories are highly speculative, the Old Book tale has been documented many times. Among those documenting the tale is the first director of the state insane asylum, George Zeller.

== The living Old Book ==
"Old Book" was a well-liked patient who worked as a gravedigger during his time at Peoria State Hospital. After each burial service, he was said to lean against an old elm tree and weep for the dead.

Old Book was said to be "mute." given name is unknown. He is allegedly called Bookbinder because of his previous work at the printing house where he worked before his institutionalization. arrived at the hospital, he became a favorite among staff.

Various sources report that Old Book's official name was recorded as Manuel Bookbinder aka A. Bookbinder (1878 - 1910), grave marker 713 on the cemetery grounds.

== The Crying Tree ==
The superstitious tale surrounding Old Book is somewhat unusual among ghost stories in that it was reportedly witnessed by hundreds of people. The story goes that when Old Book died his funeral was attended by hundreds of patients and staff members who became witnesses to the ghostly phenomenon that was about to transpire. As workers were attempting to lower what should have been a heavy casket they discovered that it instead felt empty. Suddenly, a crying sound echoed from the Graveyard Elm and everyone in attendance turned and looked, including Dr. Zeller, who later detailed Bookbinder and the surrounding events in his diary. They all claimed to have seen Old Book standing by the tree. They so believed it to be true that Zeller had the casket opened to ensure that Old Book still lay inside. As the lid was opened the crying ceased and Old Book's corpse was found undisturbed in the coffin. Days passed and the tree began to die. Several of the grounds crewmen tried to remove the Graveyard Elm or the "crying tree", as it was also known. None were successful, citing the weeping emanating from the tree. One man even tried to cut it down with an axe, but when striking the side, terrible wailing would sound as if Old Book himself was being chopped.

In later years the elm was struck during a lightning storm and was finally removed from the potters field.

== See also ==
- List of ghosts
