= Phantome =

Caribbean folklore figure

The Phantome, also known in Guyana as the Moongazer, is a figure in the folklore of Saint Lucia, Trinidad and Tobago and Guyana. It is described as an extremely tall spectre that stands at crossroads on nights of the full moon, its legs wide apart and straddling the road.

== Legend ==
According to the legend, anyone who tries to pass beneath the figure, interrupting its moongazing, is crushed when it snaps its legs shut. The only warning is said to be a shrill whistle emitted just before the attack. The Phantome is said to be able to make itself invisible, its presence revealed only by the shadow it casts in the moonlight. In some tellings, a traveller who walks around it quietly is left unharmed, but one who taunts it or distracts its gaze from the moon has their brain consumed through the palm of its hand.
