= Obia (folklore) =

Monster in West African folklore

An obia or obeah is a monster in West African folklore. It is described as being a massive animal that witches send into villages to kidnap young girls and wear their skin for a coat.

It is also the common term in the Bay Islands of Honduras for a witch or the spell that is cast by the witch. This is most likely a traditional Garifuna word.

An obiama or obiaman is one who uses the power of obia.

Edwards's History of the British Colonies in the West Indies, published in 1793, reports the best account of obeah in Jamaica. The term obeah or obia has become a popular term in Jamaica used to describe Africans on the island that practice witchcraft. It is considered to be a practice of supernatural craft, learned through connection with the devil, that allows a person to kill or as a way to receive wealth, power, or revenge on one's enemies. From testimony of all Africans on the island, it is said that the possessors of obi have always been natives of Africa, having brought the arts with them to Jamaica where it was universally practiced on a few large estates. Africans or Creoles respect, consult, and fear the obeah folklore; they hold faith to these prophecies and call upon them to cure disorders, obtain revenge, help with favors, punish thieves or adulterers, and predict future events.

== Obeah men ==
Obeah is often seen as a device for West Indian success. Since obeah brings power, fear, and respect, it is expected that an obeah man have all these traits. In a society like the West Indies, an obeah man and his trapping are synonymous. If an obeah man is known to be a good dealer, he will have many clients. If a person gains some sort of fortune through means that is not visible, then it is believed that he is dealing with some sort of supernatural power. Within the West Indian society, the practice of the obeah man is praised by his community to be a fellow man between the natural and supernatural world that works both good and evil. However, the implied obeah man who is held suspect. The implied obeah man does not help others with his skills, but uses it for personal interest and therefore is despised the community in which he lives and hated and reviled by his society.
