= Gelin =

"Bride" in Turkish

Gelin means 'bride' in Turkish. While there is folklore of a type of female ghost which also happened to have been a bride, associated with some local legend of tragedy, the term itself does not inherently mean a ghost (or banshee); such definition would be an incorrect translation of the word. It has been suggested that the family name "Gelin" was bestowed due to the beauty and popularity of the family's brides.

The Turkish word Gelinler (plural) translates in English to 'Gelins' or 'brides'.
