= Forester Township, Michigan =

Township in Michigan, United States

- Township
- Location within the state of Michigan Forester Township, Michigan (the United States)
- Coordinates: 43°31′27″N 82°35′50″W
- Country: United States
- State: Michigan
- County: Sanilac

Area
  - Total: 25.3 sq mi (65.5 km^{2})
  - Land: 25.3 sq mi (65.5 km^{2})
  - Water: 0.039 sq mi (0.1 km^{2})
- Elevation: 653 ft (199 m)

Population (2020)
  - Total: 883
  - Density: 34.9/sq mi (13.5/km^{2})
- Time zone: UTC-5 (Eastern (EST))
  - Summer (DST): UTC-4 (EDT)
- FIPS code: 26-29500
- GNIS feature ID: 1626296

Forester Township is a civil township of Sanilac County in the U.S. state of Michigan. The population was 883 at the 2020 census.

== Geography ==
According to the United States Census Bureau, the township has a total area of 25.3 square miles (66 km^{2}), of which 25.3 square miles (66 km^{2}) is land and 0.04 square miles (0.10 km^{2}) (0.12%) is water.

== Demographics ==
As of the census of 2000, there were 1,108 people, 484 households, and 326 families residing in the township. The population density was 43.8 inhabitants per square mile (16.9/km^{2}). There were 1,012 housing units at an average density of 40.0 per square mile (15.4/km^{2}). The racial makeup of the township was 98.38% White, 0.45% Native American, 0.09% Asian, 0.54% from other races, and 0.54% from two or more races. Hispanic or Latino of any race were 1.71% of the population.

There were 484 households, out of which 22.9% had children under the age of 18 living with them, 61.2% were married couples living together, 2.9% had a female householder with no husband present, and 32.6% were non-families. 29.8% of all households were made up of individuals, and 14.7% had someone living alone who was 65 years of age or older. The average household size was 2.27 and the average family size was 2.78.

In the township the population was spread out, with 21.0% under the age of 18, 4.6% from 18 to 24, 22.7% from 25 to 44, 26.7% from 45 to 64, and 24.9% who were 65 years of age or older. The median age was 46 years. For every 100 females, there were 104.8 males. For every 100 females age 18 and over, there were 101.1 males.

The median income for a household in the township was $32,614, and the median income for a family was $40,417. Males had a median income of $32,422 versus $21,328 for females. The per capita income for the township was $19,573. About 7.0% of families and 8.5% of the population were below the poverty line, including 4.6% of those under age 18 and 11.8% of those age 65 or over.
