= Shirime =

Japanese folk creature

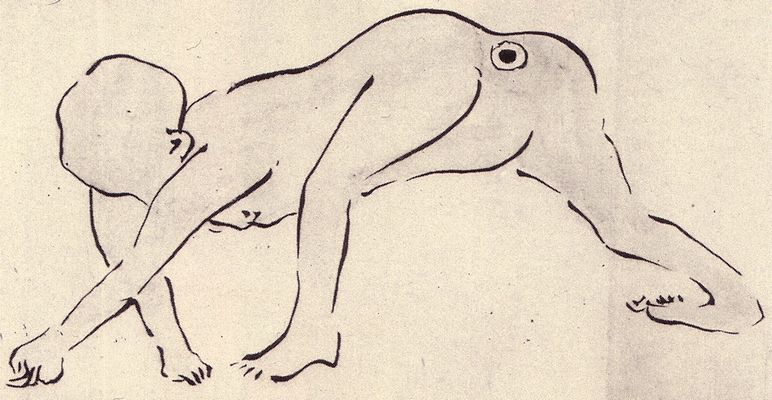
Shirime as drawn by Yosa no Buson.

Shirime (Japanese: 尻目; lit. "buttocks eye") is a yōkai that looks similar to a human with no facial features. It has an eye where its anus should be.

The story goes as follows: Long ago, a samurai was walking at night down the road to Kyōto, when he heard someone calling out for him to wait. "Who's there?!" he asked nervously, only to turn around and find a man stripping off his clothes and pointing his bare buttocks at the flabbergasted traveler. A huge glittering eye then opened up where the strange man's anus should have been.

This creature was so liked by the haiku poet and artist Buson, he included it in many of his yōkai paintings.

Although Shirime appears to have a very startling appearance, it does not mean to harm people. Its joy comes from scaring people.

== In popular culture ==
On April 1, 2023, the PC game Shirime: The Curse of Butt-Eye was released, based on the legend and starring Shirime.
