= Reportedly haunted locations in Scotland =

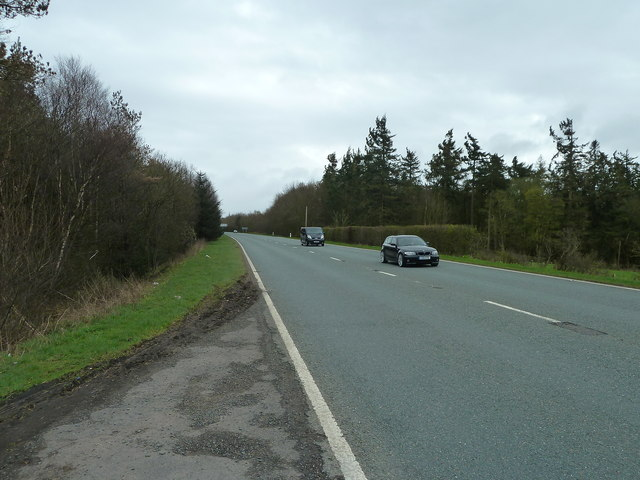
A75 road, eastbound near Kinmount

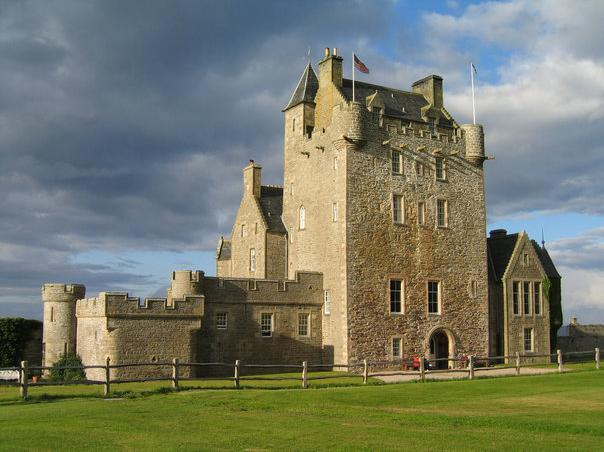
Ackergill Tower

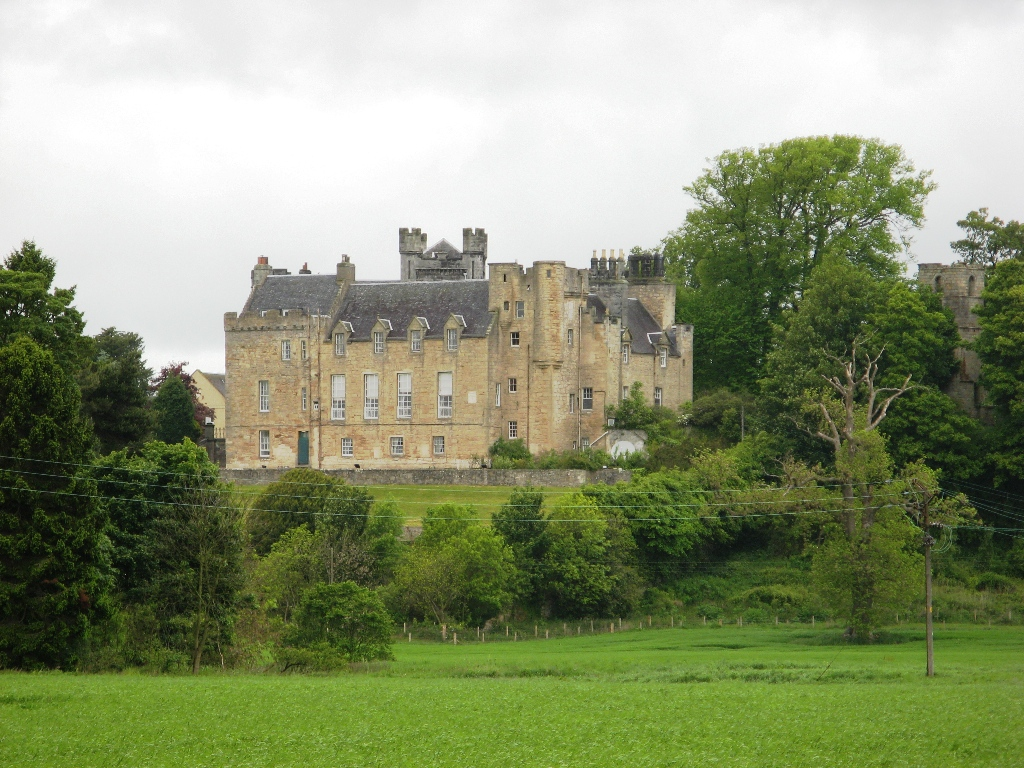
Airth Castle

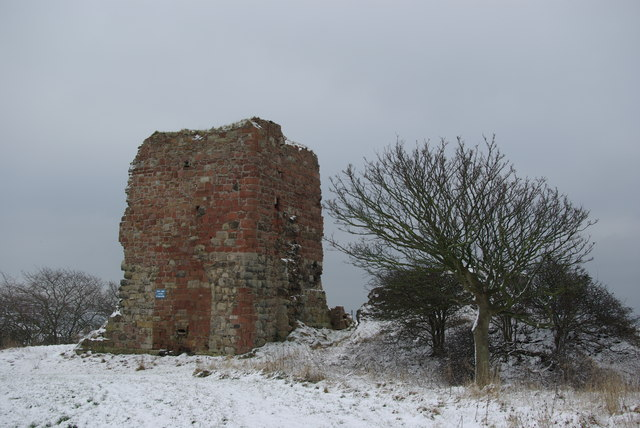
Ardrossan Castle

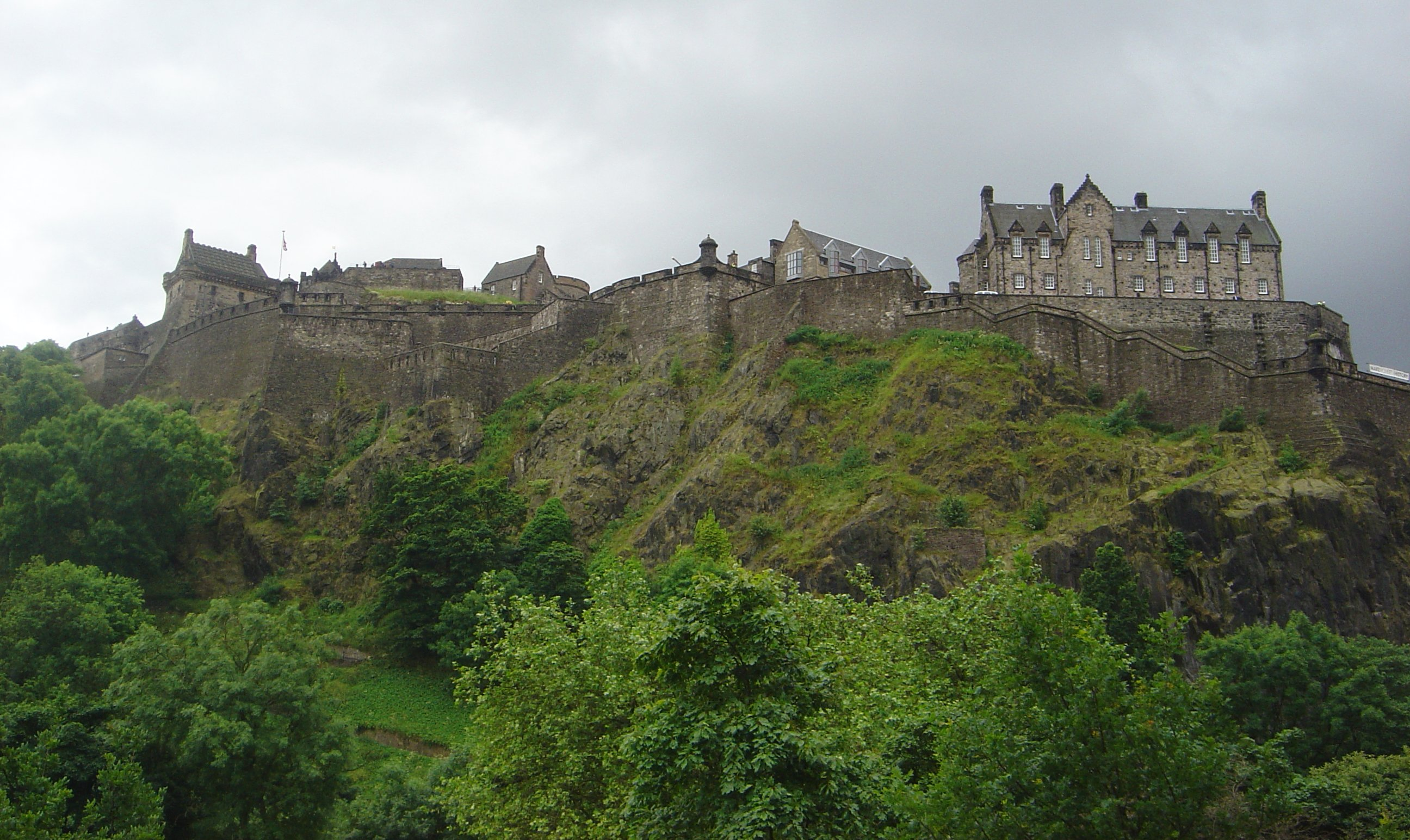
Edinburgh Castle

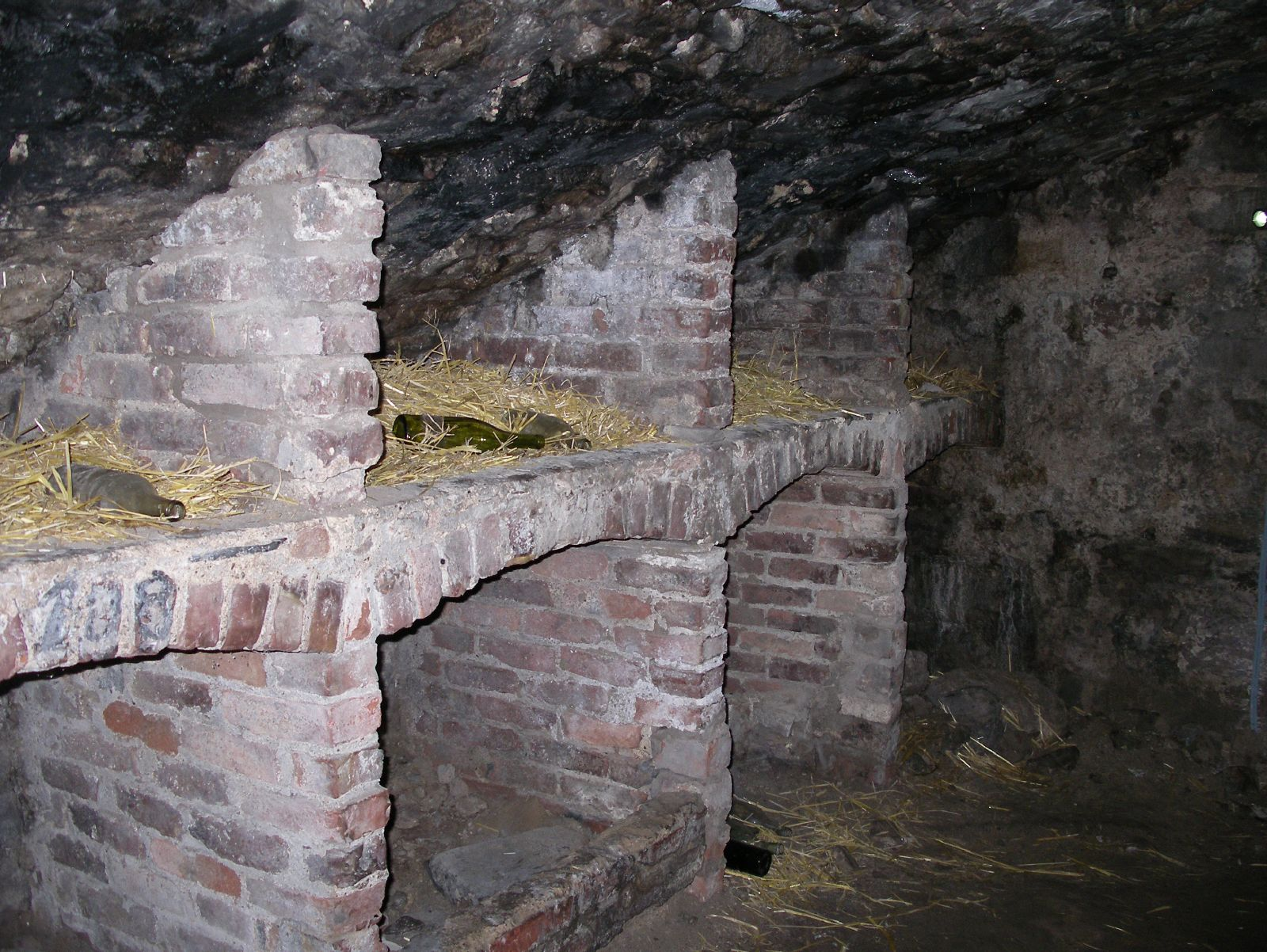
Edinburgh Vaults

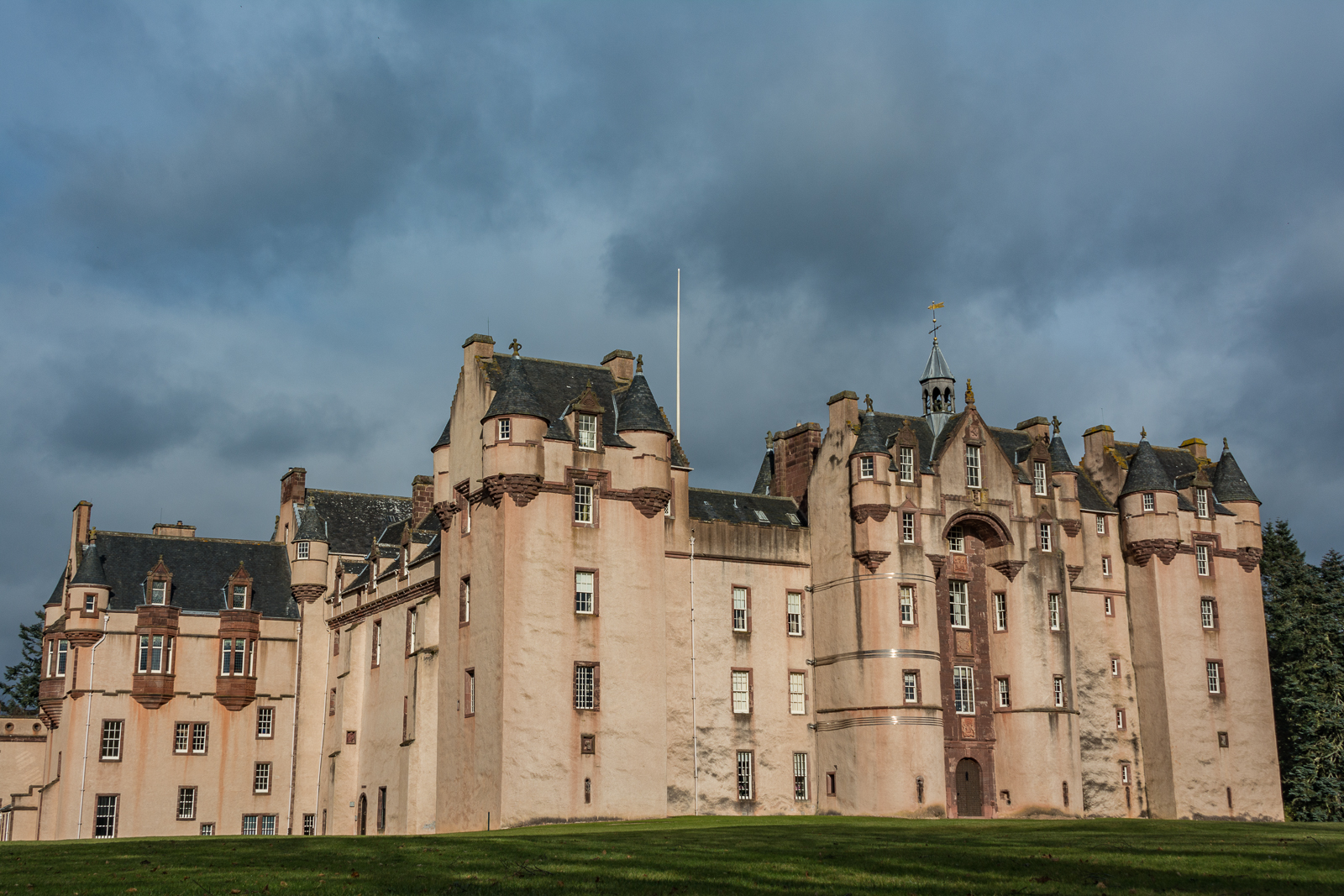
Fyvie Castle

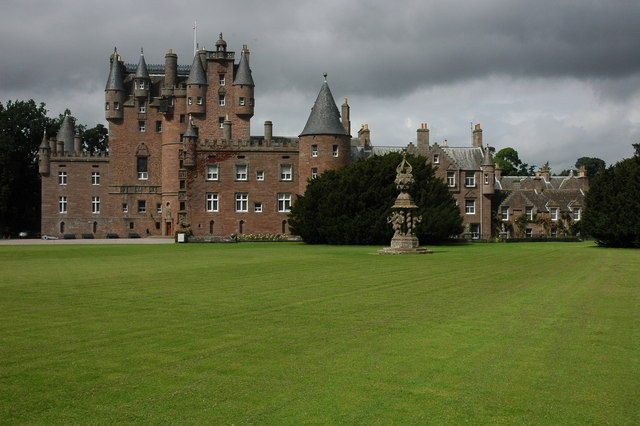
Glamis Castle

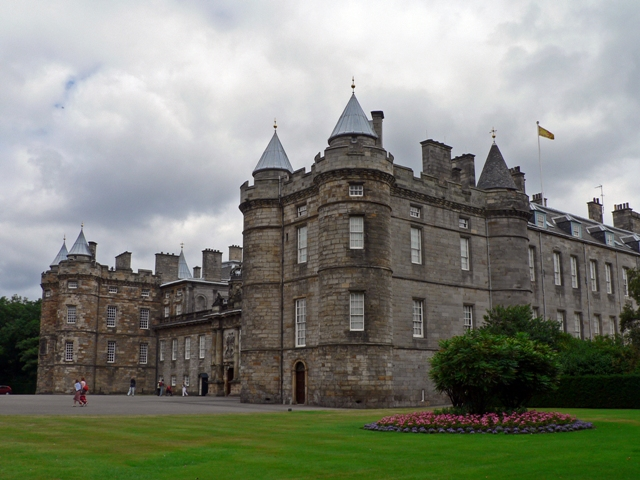
Holyrood Palace

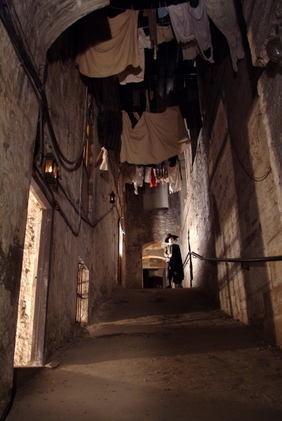
Mary King's Close

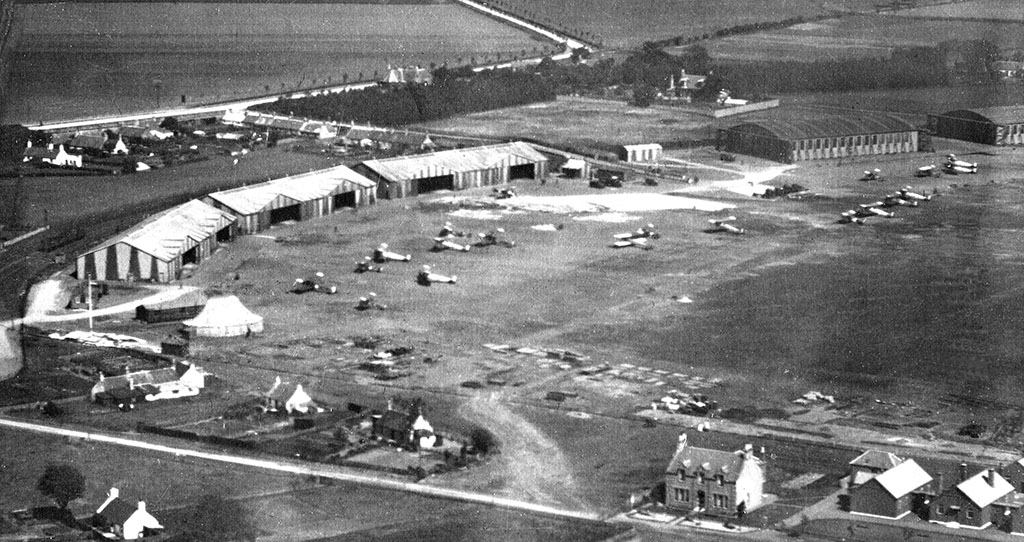
RAF Montrose, 1917

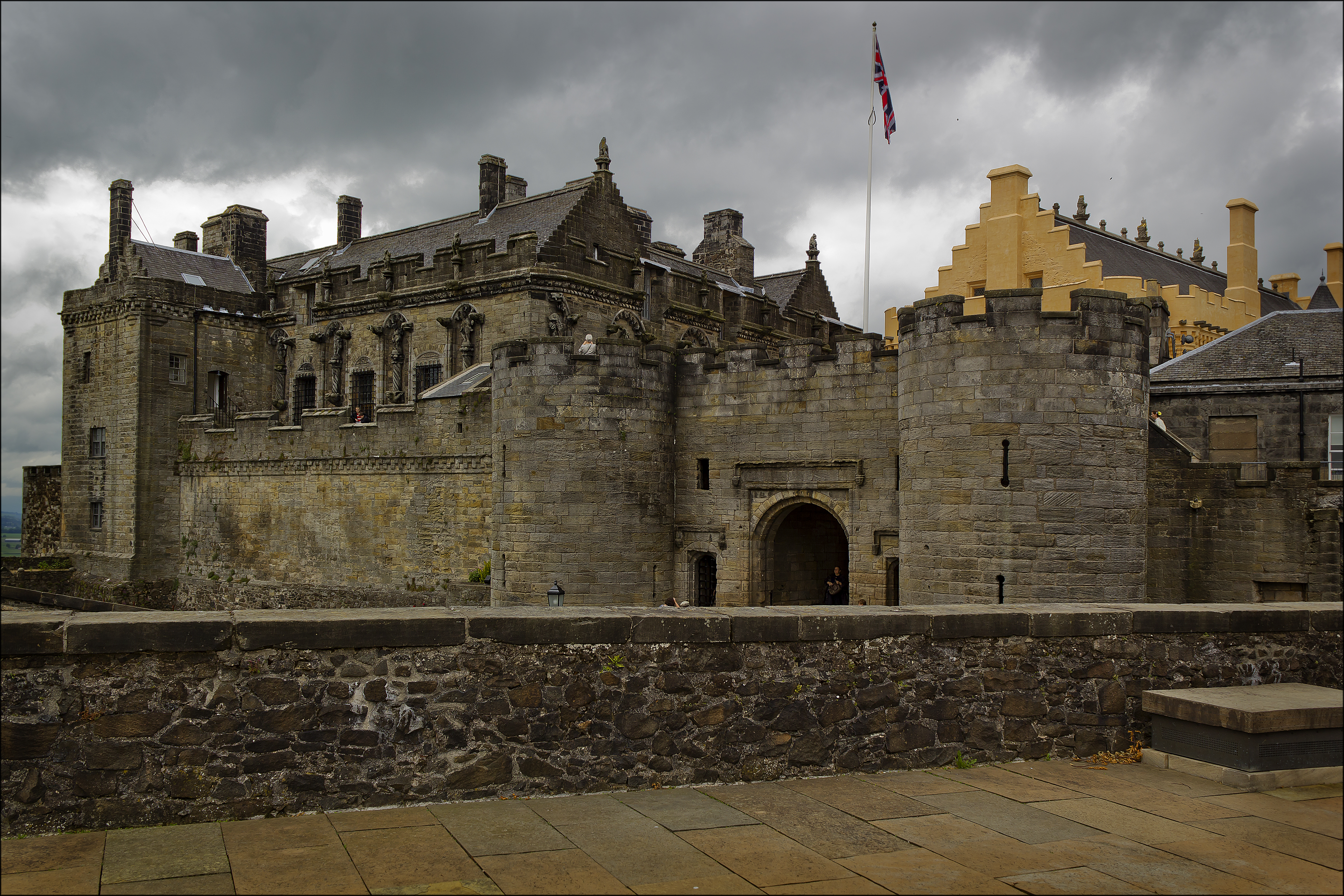
Stirling Castle

There are a number of reportedly haunted locations in Scotland.

== List ==
- A fifteen-mile stretch of the A75, between Annan and Dumfries, is reported to be haunted.
- Abergeldie Castle
- Ackergill Tower
- Airth Castle
- Ardrossan Castle is said to be haunted by the ghost of William Wallace.
- Auchentiber
- Balgonie Castle
- Ballechin House
- Bedlay Castle
- Brims Castle
- Cortachy Castle
- Craigcrook Castle
- Culzean Castle
- Dornoch Castle
- Dunstaffnage Castle
- Duntrune Castle
- Edinample Castle
- Edinburgh Castle
- Edinburgh Festival Theatre is said by believers to be haunted by a tall, dark stranger rumoured to be the famous illusionist Sigmund Neuberger, a.k.a. The Great Lafayette.
- Edinburgh Playhouse
- The Edinburgh Vaults The television series Most Haunted and Ghost Adventures both aired an episode about the vaults.
- Ethie Castle
- Fyvie Castle is said to be haunted.
- Garleton Castle
- Glamis Castle
- Castle Grant
- Hermitage Castle
- Hill House
- HM Prison Castle Huntly
- Holyrood Palace is said to be haunted by Bald Agnes, the ghost of Agnes Sampson.
- Huntingtower Castle
- Kinnaird Winetower
- Kinneil House
- Knock Castle, Isle of Skye
- Lauriston Castle
- Lennox Tower
- Linlithgow Palace
- Lochleven Castle
- Luibeilt Lodge
- Macduff's Castle
- Mary King's Close an underground close in the Old Town area of Edinburgh.
- Meggernie Castle
- Neidpath Castle
- Pinkie House.
- Queensberry House
- RAF Montrose, now Montrose Air Station Heritage Centre, is said to be haunted by the ghost of Desmond Arthur.
- Royal Lyceum Theatre
- Saltoun Hall
- Stirling Castle.
- The Scotsman Hotel
- The Tolbooth is claimed by believers to be one of the most haunted buildings in Aberdeen and has been subject to many investigations by paranormal investigation teams.
- The Witchery by the Castle, a restaurant near Edinburgh Castle, is said by believers to be haunted.

== See also ==
- Category:Paranormal places
- List of ghosts
- List of reportedly haunted locations in the world

== Bibliography ==
- Fifty Great Ghost Stories, edt. John Canning, Souvenir Press Ltd
- Scottish Hauntings, Grant Campbell, Piccolo Ltd.
