= Hantu Bongkok =

Spirit in Indonesian folklore

Hantu Bongkok (literally, humpback spirit) is a mythological, bloodthirsty ghost or evil spirit from pre-colonial-era folklore in Palembang, South Sumatra, Indonesia. A female variant of the figure is known as Nenek Bongkok (humpback grandmother).
