= Tatarigami =

Shinto category of spirit or deity

A tatarigami (祟り神; "curse god" or "curse spirit") is a powerful, wrathful spirit or deity in traditional Japanese folklore, who has become wrathful through ill treatment by humans; tatarigami can be appeased through the appropriate rituals, festivals or shrines.

== Cultural and historical context ==
In Shinto, medieval Buddhist and syncretic Shinto-Buddhist accounts, tatarigami can range from primordial deities like the eight-headed Yamata no Orochi to the restless spirits of the dead who become tatarigami to enact vengeance or fulfil a curse upon the living.

The term largely arose prior to and in the early Kamakura period during evaluations that attempted to categorize the majority of Shinto deities as having a Buddhist equivalent. Scholars and religious authorities of the period concluded that certain Shinto deities did not have Buddhist counterparts, and due to the dominant political class being largely Buddhist, rendered these non-Buddhist spirits as "cursing kami". Thereafter tatarigami became part of regular Shinto-Buddhist and Shinto theological mores, figuring into folklore as well as religious ritual and ceremony.

The Buddhist-oriented early Kamakura definition of tatarigami also ensconced native deities like Amaterasu at first, but this was subsequently re-evaluated or challenged to elevate or separate many of the Shinto deities into other classes such as ujigami (clan deities).

== See also ==
- Onryō – a type of vengeful ghost in Japanese folklore
