= Mbwiri =

Mbwiri is a Central African demon who is said to possess people. Those he possesses would usually be diagnosed with epilepsy by a doctor.

When such a possession occurs, the shaman is called. A hut is built in which the afflicted resides along with the shaman and his assistants until he is cured. For ten days or a fortnight, these people eat and drink at the expense of the patient's relatives and dance to the music of flute and drum. Mbwiri is said to abhor good living and this is the best way to drive him out. The patient will be the only one who knows that he is possessed. The patient also dances until the epileptic fits come on. When he is pronounced cured, he builds a little fetish house and thenceforth avoids certain kinds of food and performs certain duties. Sometimes, however, the process appears to result in madness, and some patients run away into the bush.
