= Peoria State Hospital =

Former psychiatric hospital, active between 1902–1973

- U.S. National Register of Historic Places
- U.S. Historic district
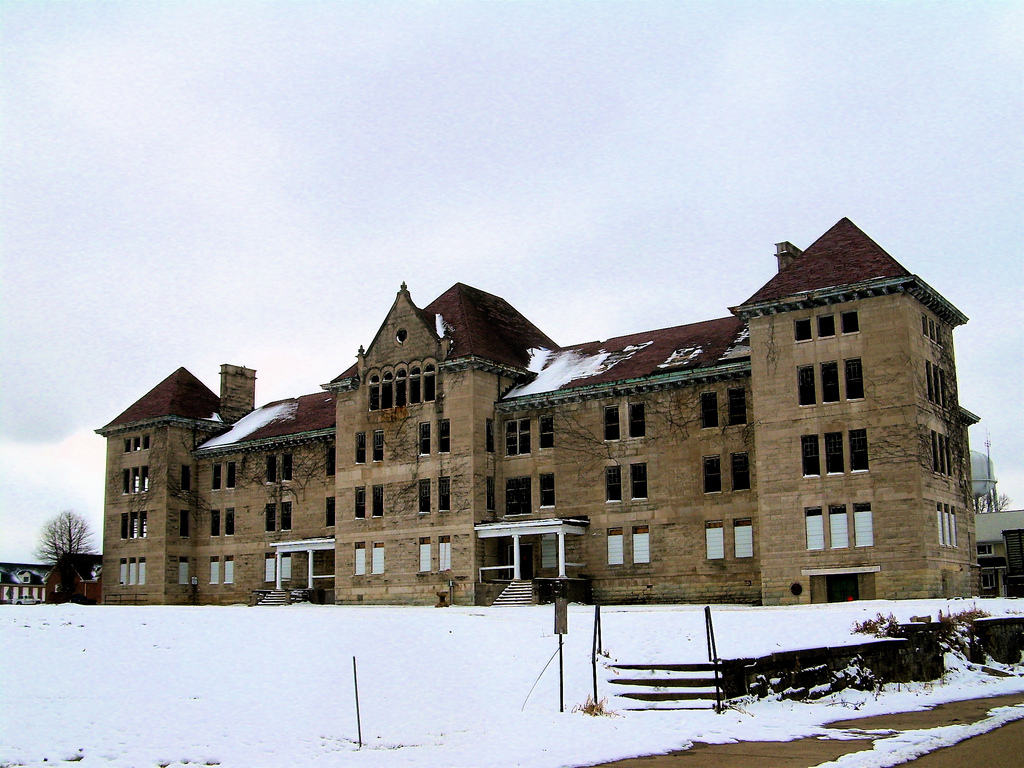
- The Bowen Building - Nurses Dorm and Administration building at the former Peoria State Hospital

- Location within Peoria County, Illinois Location within Illinois
- Location: Ricketts Ave. and U.S. 24, Bartonville, Illinois
- Coordinates: 40°38′19″N 89°39′42″W
- Area: 215.5 acres (87.2 ha)
- Built: 1895-1910; 1902 (opened)
- Architect: Reeves and Baillie
- Architectural style: Prairie style, Mission style, Classical Revival, Georgian Revival
- NRHP reference No.: 82002590
- Added to NRHP: February 17, 1982

Peoria State Hospital Historic District, also known as Bartonville State Hospital or Illinois Asylum for the Incurable Insane, was a psychiatric hospital operated by the State of Illinois from 1902 to 1973. The hospital is located in Bartonville, Illinois, near the city of Peoria in Peoria County. The hospital grounds were listed as a historic district on the National Register of Historic Places.

== History ==
The hospital was founded as a result of the Illinois General Assembly's provision for the establishment of the Illinois Asylum for the Incurable Insane in 1895. In response to the legislation, then Governor John Altgeld appointed a three-person commission charged with site selection. The commission president was John Finely, a Peorian, and one of the members was J.J. McAndrews of Chicago who later served in the U.S. House of Representatives as a Congressman. The commission selected the site near Peoria, in Bartonville.

Construction at the site started in 1895 with the main building completed in 1897. This building was never used, however, as its structural integrity was compromised by abandoned mine shafts on the property. The 1927 history of the hospital, however, gives a different explanation for its abandonment:

"The first building erected was a facsimile of a feudal castle, but before it was occupied it was found to be wholly out of harmony with modern ideas for the care of the insane and it was razed and replaced by the present cottage plan, under the direction of Dr. Frederick Howard Wines, the able secretary of the State Board of Charities."

In 1902, reconstruction was completed under the direction of Dr. George Zeller as a cottage system plan of 33 buildings . Among the buildings were patient and caretaker housing, a store, a power station, and a communal utility building.

The Illinois Hospital for the Incurable Insane began operations on February 10, 1902 and patients characterized as "incurable" were transferred to Bartonville from other Illinois facilities. In 1906 the hospital opened a training school for nurses. From 1907 to 1909 the facility was known as the Illinois General Hospital for the Insane and, in 1909, Peoria State Hospital. This same year, the offices of Board of Commissioners and Board of State Commissioners of Public Charities were abolished and all state-run charitable institutions were administered by the Board of Administration.

On the hospital's 25th anniversary in 1927, the population was 2,650 with a total of 13,510 patients having entered the facility. During this time, Dr. Zeller was widely respected for his focus on therapeutic efforts. Zeller crusaded for a better public understanding of the mentally ill including inviting newspaper reporters and community members to visit Peoria State. From 1943 until 1969 the hospital participated in a departmental affiliation program for psychiatric nursing which provided instruction in psychiatric nursing to students from regional general hospital nursing schools.

From 1917 until 1961 the hospital was operated by the Illinois Department of Public Welfare. In 1961 the Department of Mental Health was created and assumed responsibility of the institution.

At its peak in the 1950s, Bartonville housed 2,800 patients. By 1972 when its closure was announced, the patient census had dropped to 600. After the hospital closed, the buildings stood empty and were auctioned off. When the initial auction buyer went bankrupt, developer, Winsley Durand, Jr., took over ownership with the hope of creating office space in the structures. His plan was never fully realized and the buildings remained empty. Since that time, many of the remaining structures have been demolished and others were renovated to house various commercial and industrial businesses. The Village of Bartonville has established the entire property as a TIF district to encourage further growth and development of the property.

The Bowen building, the nurses' dorm and college and administration building, was demolished in 2016 by the save the Bowen NFP to repay loans. Unfortunately, the loans remain unpaid to the Village of Bartonville.

== Architecture ==
The grounds consisted of 63 buildings, many of which are residential in nature and laid out to the traditional cottage plan, common for mental hospitals built in the early 20th century. The original main building constructed was on the Kirkbride Plan. There are only 12 of the 63 buildings left standing as of July 1, 2019. All are currently occupied.

== Ghost stories ==
The hospital grounds are the subject of local ghost lore. One well documented legend tells of Manuel A. Bookbinder "Old Book", a patient who worked with the burial crew at the hospital until his own death. It is said that upon his death his physical form was seen by Dr. Zeller and over a hundred of the patients and nurses that attended his funeral crying at the old elm in the potters field. A closer inspection of the casket for which he rested showed the peaceful remains of the loved figure still resting within, thus the legend of the "Graveyard Elm" began.

In the 1920s, Zeller penned a book titled, Befriending The Bereft, drawn from the mysterious experiences he had at the hospital during his two tenures as superintendent, 1902–1913 and 1921–1935. Included, among numerous other eerie stories, were Zeller's own account of Old Book and the Graveyard Elm.

The paranormal claims of Peoria State Hospital were investigated by The Atlantic Paranormal Society (TAPS) in the TV show Ghost Hunters.
