= Obambo =

Supernatural being in Central African mythology

An Obambou, also Obambo or Obamba, is a supernatural being belonging to tribes of Central Africa. It is depicted as evil, possessing the power to do evil and to do good if it chooses, having the ability to possess and cause sickness, or to want a home built for them. In some African tribes, an Obambou is referred to as a devil, or as the spirit of someone who was not buried correctly.

== Possession/sickness ==
The Commi tribe believed that when someone is severely ill, an Obambou is a likely culprit which can be determined by a doctor or "Ogounga". The Obambou will reside in the bowels of humans until family, friends and neighbors surround the possessed person and make noise however they can. The people will sing, dance, yell, and bang things together. They do whatever makes noise to drive out the Obambou.

The M'pongwe tribe believed that a person can be born with the spirit known as an Obambou and be born insane. Most tribes that believe in the Obambou have a common belief that an Obambou can drive someone insane through possession.

== Different lore ==
There are no idols or special symbols for the "devil" or powerful spirit version of the Obambou.

Another version is that the Obambou resides in the bush and in some cases was not buried properly, but eventually it gets tired of wandering and appears to a close relative, requesting that they build a house for them near their own. That night the village women are gathered to dance and sing, and next day the people visit the grave of the deceased and make an idol for them. They then erect a little hut near the house of the person the Obambou visited; then place the bier on which the deceased was carried to his grave inside the hut, as well as some of the dust from the grave. A white cloth is then draped over the door.

In some tribes, Obambou is married to a female spirit.
