= Thayé =

Burmese mythological evil spirit

In Burmese mythology, the thayé (Burmese: သရဲ), also spelled 'tasei' (တစ္ဆေ), are deceased evil people condemned to be disembodied spirits. They often appear as tall, dark people with huge ears, long tongues, and tusk-like teeth. Thayé enter towns at noon or at night, and in rural areas of Myanmar, villagers say they cause illness or disease, such as cholera and smallpox.

The thayé is said to have many faces and bodies; e.g., one might be a pregnant ghost with a fat white body and big ears. Others may be tall and slim, male, or with other varying characteristics.
