= Shade (mythology) =

Spirit or ghost in literature and poetry

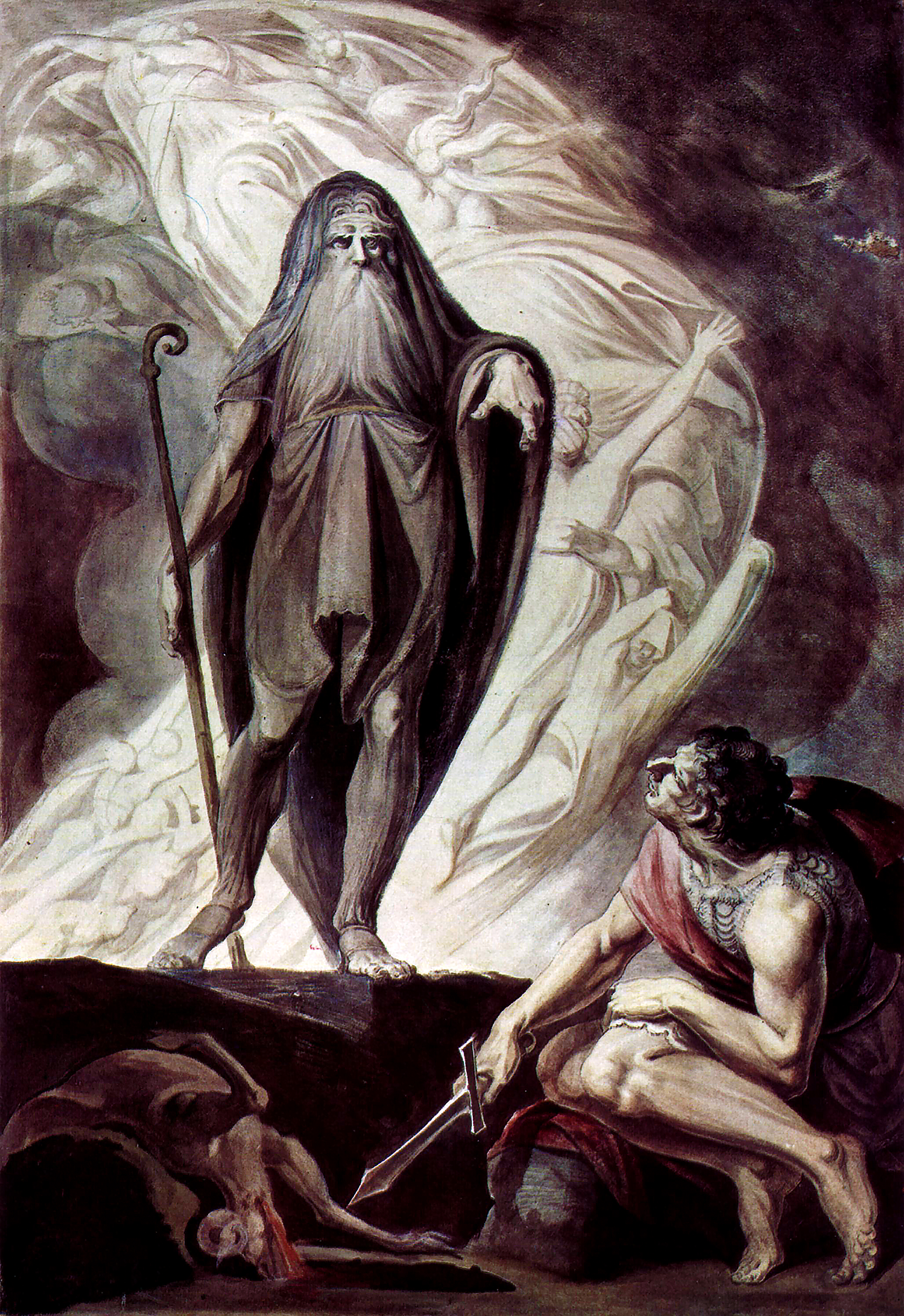
The Shade of Tiresias Appearing to Odysseus during the Sacrifice (c. 1780–85), painting by Johann Heinrich Füssli, showing a scene from Book Ten of the Odyssey

In poetry and literature, a shade (translating Greek σκιά, Latin umbra) is the spirit or ghost of a dead person, residing in the underworld.

An underworld where the dead live in shadow was common to beliefs in the ancient Near East. In Biblical Hebrew, it was called tsalmavet (צַלמָוֶת, 'death shadow') as an alternate term for Sheol. The Witch of Endor in the First Book of Samuel notably conjures the ghost (אוֹב, ōv) of Samuel.

Only select individuals were believed to be exempt from the fate of dwelling in shadow after death. They would instead ascend to the divine sphere, as is reflected in the veneration of heroes. Plutarch relates how Alexander the Great was inconsolable after the death of Hephaistion up to the moment he received an oracle of Ammon confirming that the deceased was a hero, i.e. enjoyed the status of a divinity.

Shades appear in Book Eleven of Homer's Odyssey, when Odysseus descends into Hades, and in Book Six of Virgil's Aeneid, when Aeneas travels to the underworld. In the Divine Comedy by Dante Alighieri, many of the dead are similarly referred to as shades (Italian ombra), including Dante's guide, Virgil.

The phrase "peace to thy gentle shade [and endless rest]" is sometimes seen in epitaphs, and was used by Alexander Pope in his epitaph for Nicholas Rowe.

== See also ==
- Descent to the underworld
- Doppelgänger
- Egyptian Book of the Dead
- Greek underworld
- Hades
- Manes
- Rephaite
- Shadow (psychology)
- Shadow person
