= Headless Horseman =

Mythical figure

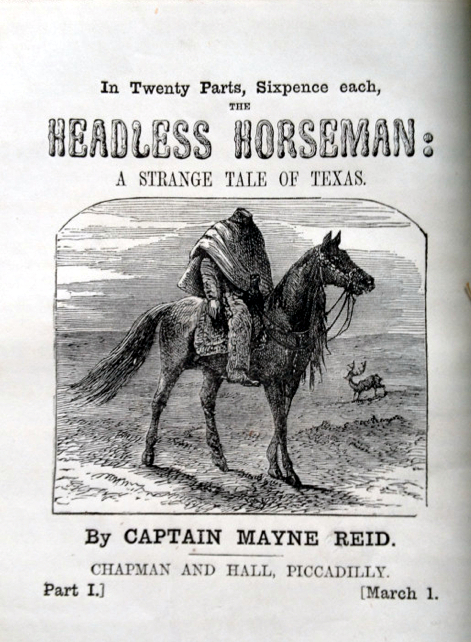
Cover page to Mayne Reid's version of the legend that was published in 1865

The Headless Horseman is an archetype of mythical figure that has appeared in folklore around Europe since the Middle Ages. The figures are traditionally depicted as riders on horseback who are missing their heads. These myths have since inspired a number of stories and characters in culture around the world, including The Legend of Sleepy Hollow.

== Description ==
Depending on the legend, the Horseman is either carrying his head, or is missing his head altogether, and may be searching for it. Famous examples include the dullahan from Ireland, who is a demonic fairy usually depicted riding a horse and carrying his head under his arm, and "The Legend of Sleepy Hollow," a short story written in 1820 by American writer Washington Irving, which has been adapted into several other works of literature and film including the 1949 Disney animated film The Adventures of Ichabod and Mr. Toad and the 1999 Tim Burton film Sleepy Hollow.

=== In Irish folklore ===
The dullahan or dulachán ("dark man") is a headless, demonic fairy, usually riding a horse and carrying his head under his arm. Some versions of the story claim the dullahan is the spirit of Crom Dubh, a Celtic god worshipped in Ireland until the arrival of Christian missionaries in the 6th century. He wields a whip made from a human corpse's spine. When the dullahan stops riding, a death occurs. The dullahan calls out a name, at which point the named person immediately dies. In another version, he is the headless driver of a black carriage, the Cóiste Bodhar. A similar figure, the gan ceann ("without a head"), can be frightened away by wearing a gold object or putting one in his path.

=== In Scottish folklore ===
The most prominent Scottish tale of the headless horseman concerns a man named Ewen decapitated in a clan battle at Glen Cainnir on the Isle of Mull. The battle denied him any chance to be a chieftain, and both he and his horse are headless in accounts of his haunting of the area. Among the Highland Scottish diaspora in Cape Breton, Nova Scotia, seeing the image or hearing the sound of a horse or headless rider is traditionally regarded as an omen of an imminent death within the family.

=== In Welsh folklore ===
A number of stories of headless horsemen and women are also found in Welsh folklore. The "Fenyw heb un pen" (English: The headless woman) who rides a "Ceffyl heb un pen" (English: horse without a head). Bryn Hall in Llanymawddwy is said to have been haunted by a headless horseman which only came to an end when one of the Hall's servants discerned a message from the horseman identifying the location of a buried body. The body was said to be that of an illegitimate child fathered by the Lord of Bryn Hall.

As Wales shares cultural similarities with Cornwall, it is possible that a version of the Welsh horsemen (or a Cornish equivalent) may have been what was known to the parents of Washington Irving, who originated in Cornwall.

=== In German folklore ===
In Germany, headless-horseman stories come mostly from the Rhineland. Rather than using decapitation, the headless horsemen killed their victims simply by touching them. They were revenants who had to wander the earth until they had atoned for their sins, sometimes by doing a good deed for a stranger, but instead of showing their gratitude by shaking hands, the stranger and the horseman held a tree branch between them and the branch would wither and die rather than the stranger. Another version of the legend spoke of Der Kopflose Reiter (the headless horseman), who would warn the living of impending danger and chase down and punish the wicked.

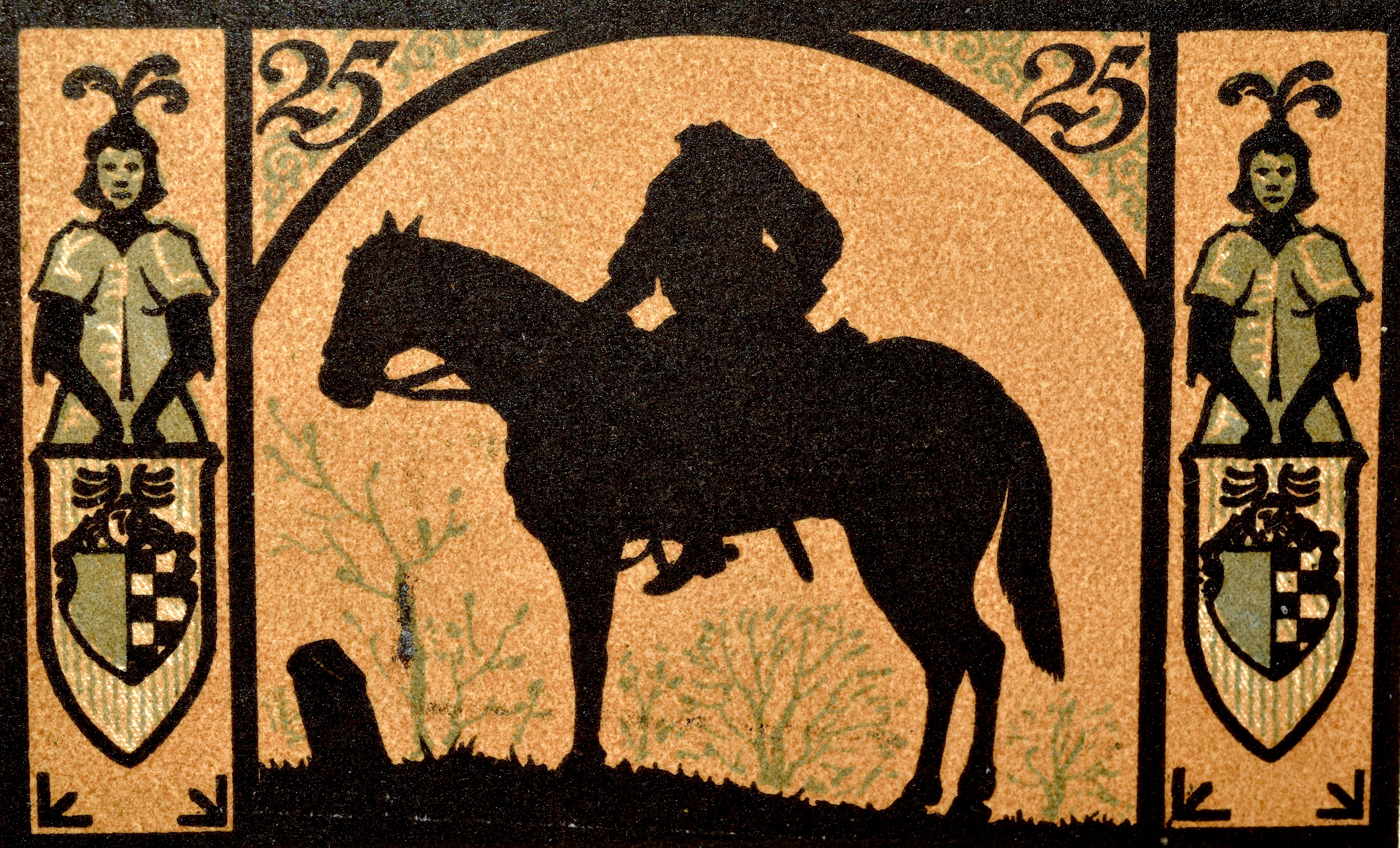
A notgeld note from the town of Berga, 1921, depicting the German headless horseman

=== In English folklore ===
Dartmoor, an area in England's ceremonial county Devon, is said to be haunted by a headless rider. In Arthurian legend, a figure known as the Green Knight appeared before King Arthur's court and challenged one man to come forward and strike him with his axe, warning them that he will strike them the same blow in a year. Gawain, Arthur's nephew, accepted the challenge and beheaded the knight, who proceeded to retrieve his head and remind Gawain to meet him at the Green Chapel to fulfill his half of the challenge.

=== In Texan folklore ===
In southern Texas, stories of a figure known as "El Muerto" have circulated since the mid-1800s. El Muerto is said to dangle his head from his saddle, and his horse is variably said to produce lightning from its hooves as they strike the ground. It has been speculated that this particular iteration of the headless horseman was based on another legend in which a man was captured and beheaded for stealing horses. The man was then "made an example" when his killers tied his decapitated body to a wild horse, tied the head to the pommel of the saddle, and sent the horse on its way.

== In popular culture ==
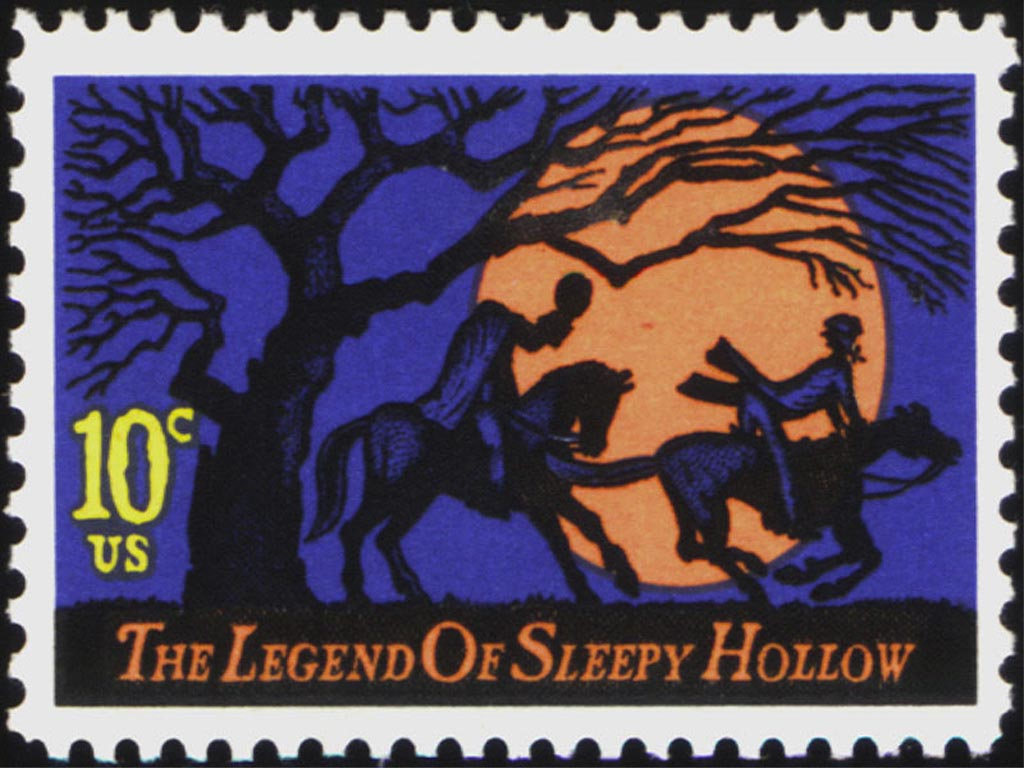
US postage stamp, 1974

=== Literature ===
Washington Irving's short story The Legend of Sleepy Hollow features a character known as the Headless Horseman. It may have been inspired, at least in part, by the rumored discovery of a headless corpse in the area after the Revolutionary War Battle of White Plains, later allegedly buried in an unmarked grave in the Burying Ground of the Old Dutch Church of Sleepy Hollow. (There is, indeed, a record of an anonymous Hessian soldier being decapitated by a cannonball during the battle, but there is no documented record of his body being found and buried.) Then again, Irving was probably familiar with the European folklore in which the figure of a headless rider has appeared since the Middle Ages. In any case, since its publication in 1820, Irving's Headless Horseman has become an integral part of American folklore.

=== Comics ===
The comic book series Chopper, written by Martin Shapiro, is a modern-day reimagining of the Headless Horseman. It features a headless outlaw biker on a motorcycle who collected the souls of sinners. The only people who can see him are those who have consumed a strange new Ecstasy-like drug that triggers their sixth sense and opens a gateway to the afterlife. During the hallucinogenic high, any characters who have committed significant sins are hunted by the headless ghost. Once the drug wears off, the victim is safe and beyond the Headless Horseman's reach.

=== Film ===
The Headless Horseman appears in "The Legend of Sleepy Hollow" segment of the 1949 film The Adventures of Ichabod and Mr. Toad. Just like the story, the Headless Horseman pursues Ichabod Crane which ends with the Headless Horseman throwing his pumpkin head at him. While it was mentioned what happened to Ichabod's hat was found near the shattered pumpkin, a rumor was mentioned that he has married a wealthy widow in a distant county with children who look like him. While the original story implies that the Horseman was merely Brom Bones in disguise, the film depicts him as an actual ghost. This rendition of the Headless Horseman was also featured in the television series House of Mouse in recurring cameo appearances, and in the 2023 short film Once Upon a Studio.

In the 1939 Will Hay comedy film Ask a Policeman, a headless horseman appears in connection with a smuggling ring.

In the 1999 Tim Burton film Sleepy Hollow, the Headless Horseman is the ghost of a murderous Hessian mercenary (performed by Ray Park in Headless Horseman form and portrayed by Christopher Walken in his true form) summoned by Katrina Van Tassel's stepmother Lady Van Tassel to eliminate her enemies after she stole his skull from his grave and used it to control him. After Ichabod Crane returns his skull, the Horseman returns to Hell, taking Lady Van Tassel with him.

The 2007 Sci Fi Channel film Headless Horseman takes the tack that Irving's story was the "white-washed" version and the events in this horror film is the real story. It stars Richard Moll and Billy Aaron Brown and is directed by Anthony C. Ferrante.

The 2022 The Asylum film Headless Horseman directed by Jose Prendes.

=== Television ===
The Kolchak: The Night Stalker episode "Chopper" (initially broadcast on January 31, 1975) features a headless motorcyclist who enacts revenge for the loss of his head on a rival biker gang, 20 years after his murder.

The 1999 Season 4 Hey Arnold! episode 14 "The Headless Cabbie" depicts a headless cab driver.

The Midsomer Murders episode "The Dark Rider" (Series 15, Episode 1) shows a murder within a family who believes seeing a headless horseman is the mark of death, only for secrets to unravel the true culprit.

The 2013 series Sleepy Hollow, loosely inspired by Irving's original story, depicts the Headless Horseman as both the ghost of Abraham "Brom" Bones and as one of the Four Horsemen of the Apocalypse.

=== Video games ===
The Headless Horseman is the central character in multiple video games such as Dullahan and Headless Jack. The horseman also appears in many other games such as Assassin's Creed III, Assassin's Creed Rogue, The Binding of Isaac: Rebirth, The Elder Scrolls V: Skyrim, Castlevania: Rondo of Blood, Roblox, Fate/Grand Order, Team Fortress 2, Limbus Company, Wizard101, and World of Warcraft as a minor or secret and usually adversarial character or even an in-game costume.

=== Miscellaneous ===
The Headless Horseman mascot for Sleepy Hollow High School, in Westchester County, New York, has been referred to as "America's scariest high school mascot". Since 1983, Conner Prairie Interactive Historic Park in Fishers, Indiana has held a Headless Horseman festival celebrating the legend with a haunted corn maze and other activities. The horseman is also seen as a costumed character on a horse.

== See also ==
- Saint symbology
- Dullahan
- Headless Rider urban legend
- Cephalophore – a saint who is generally depicted carrying their severed head
- Chhinnamasta – a Hindu goddess holding her own severed head
- Beheading game – Motif of medieval romance
- Decapitation – Complete separation of the head from the body
- Headhunting – Practice of hunting a human and collecting the severed head after killing the victim
- Headless priest
- Shrunken head
- With Her Head Tucked Underneath Her Arm
- Saints Gemolo and Himerius of Bosto
- Headless men
- Headless Mule, a character in Brazilian folklore
- List of ghosts
- List of ghost films
