= Chopper =

Chopper may refer to:

== Transportation ==
- A colloquialism for helicopter
- Chopper (motorcycle), a type of customized motorcycle
  - Chopper bicycle, a customized bicycle modeled after the motorcycle
- Nickname for the British Rail Class 20 diesel-electric locomotive
- Norwegian coupling or chopper coupler, a manually operated coupling at each end of some narrow-gauge railway rolling stock

== Arts and entertainment ==
- Chopper (comics), a horror comic book mini-series
- Chopper (film), a 2000 Australian film
- Chopper (Judge Dredd), a character in British comics anthologies 2000 AD and Judge Dredd
- Chopper (video game), a 2009 iOS video game
- Chopper I, a 1988 video game developed by SNK
- Tony Tony Chopper, a character from the manga One Piece

== People ==
- Christopher Hope (journalist) (born 1971), British journalist
- Mark "Chopper" Read (1954–2013), Australian criminal, author and recording artist

== Other ==
- Chopper (archaeology), a stone tool
- Chopper (electronics), a switching device
- Chopper (ghost), an alleged ghost in Germany
- Chopper (propeller), a propeller design
- Chopper (rap), a vocal delivery style
- Chopper (Star Wars character), a droid from the Star Wars Rebels animated series
- Nick Chopper, the Tin Woodman in L. Frank Baum's Oz series
