= Headless Mule =

Paranormal entity from Brazilian folklore

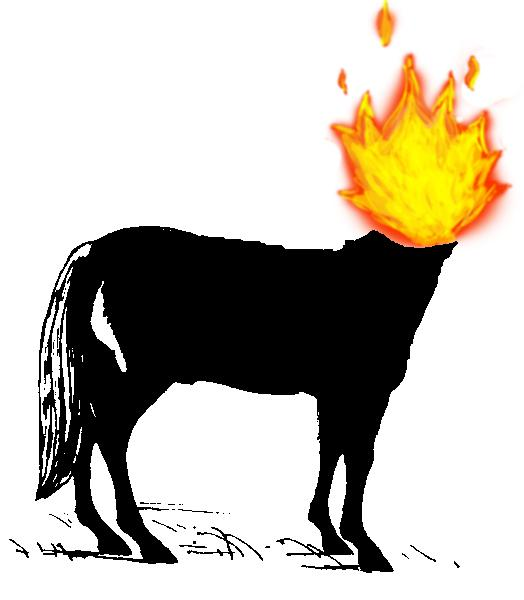
- An artistic representation of the Headless Mule

Creature information
- Other name: Mula sem cabeça (Portuguese)
- Grouping: Mythical creature
- Sub grouping: Shapeshifter, Ghostly entity
- Similar entities: Headless Horseman, Muladona, Sihuanaba
- Folklore: Brazilian folklore

Origin
- First attested: 1940s
- Country: Brazil
- Region: all Brazilian states
- Habitat: Crossroads, Parishes, open fields
- Details: A cursed woman transformed into a headless, fiery mule due to a grave sin, often adultery with a priest. Known for loud neighing, sulfuric odor, and fiery manifestations.

The Headless Mule (Portuguese: mula sem cabeça, pronounced [ˈmulɐ ˈsẽj kɐˈbesɐ]) is a mythical character in Brazilian folklore.

== Origins and occurrence ==
The term "Headless Mule" was first recorded in the 1940s. Though the myth is believed to have a medieval origin (around the 12th century), and to have been brought to Brazil in the early colonial era (16th century or later).

The tale is most popular in the states of Goiás, Minas Gerais, São Paulo, Paraná and Mato Grosso but is well known throughout the country. Similar myths (the Muladona and the Almamula) occur in the surrounding Hispanic countries.

== Appearance ==
The Mule's appearance varies greatly from region to region. Its color is most commonly described as brown, sometimes as black. It has silver (or iron) horseshoes that produce a hideous trotting, louder than any horse is capable of producing.

Despite being headless, the Mule still neighs (usually very loudly), and sometimes it moans like a crying woman. It also has a bridle tied to its non-existent mouth, and spews fire through its non-existent nostrils (or, in some versions, from its severed neck).

== The curse ==
According to most reports, the Mule is condemned to gallop over the territory of seven parishes each night (just as the Brazilian version of the werewolf). By some accounts, its trip begins and ends at the parish where the sin was committed.

Transformation usually occurs at a crossroads. Depending on the source the headless mule may have a placeholder head and mane, made of the fire it spews, to which a red-hot iron bridle is tied.

The curse of the Headless Mule cannot be transmitted (unlike the vampiric curse), because it is acquired as a result of a sin committed willfully by the accursed woman.

The transformation can be reversed temporarily by spilling the mule's blood with the prick of a needle or by tying her to a cross. In the first case, transformation will be prevented while the benefactor is alive and lives in the same parish in which the feat was accomplished. In the second case, the woman will remain in human form until the sun dawns, but will transform again when it sets.

A more stable removal of the curse can be achieved by removing the bridle, in which case the woman will not shape shift again while the benefactor is alive. Tying the bridle back to the woman's mouth will return the curse.

Removal of the curse is a great relief for the woman because the curse includes many trials, after which the woman usually repents her sins and often marries the benefactor. When the mule changes back to human form, the accursed woman is generally naked and smells of sulfur.

A person who encounters the mule should not cross its path, or the mule will follow the offender and trample him down. Instead, one should either be brave enough to remove the bridle or spill its blood, or else just lay face down on the ground, covering teeth and nails (as well as anything that shines), and the mule will hopefully fail to notice the stranger's presence and trot away (because it has poor vision).

== Headless priest ==
There is also a similar, though much less known, folk tale where the curse fell on the sinning priest. In this story, the priest's headless ghost rides through the night on a normal horse, much like the Headless Horseman in Washington Irving's story The Legend of Sleepy Hollow. Indeed, this variant of the myth may well be just a modern import of that 19th-century tale.

== Popular culture ==
- The Headless Mule appears in AdventureQuest Worlds as "Mula Sem Cabeça". This version of the mule is depicted as having a fire for a head. It is among the creatures that attack Terra da Festa before the Carnaval Party.
- In Ragnarok Online MMORPG, the Headless Mule is a monster in Brasilis Field. It appears as a red, fiery, headless horse.
- In the 2nd season of the Netflix series Invisible City, Headless Mule was portrayed as a woman named Clarisse. She had cheated on her husband with the town's priest, which led to her turning into the creature.

== See also ==
- Muladona
- Sihuanaba
- Dullahan
- Headless Rider urban legend
- Cephalophore – a saint who is generally depicted carrying their severed head
- Chhinnamasta – a Hindu goddess holding her own severed head
- Beheading game – Motif of medieval romance
- Decapitation – Complete separation of the head from the body
- Headhunting – Practice of hunting a human and collecting the severed head after killing the victim
- Shrunken head
- Decapitation in Islam
- With Her Head Tucked Underneath Her Arm
- Saints Gemolo and Himerius of Bosto
- Headless Horseman
- Headless priest
- Headless men
- List of ghosts
- List of ghost films
