= List of KonoSuba volumes =

List of a Wikimedia project

KonoSuba is a Japanese light novel series written by Natsume Akatsuki. The series has received four spin-off light novels and a manga adaptation.

== Light novels ==
=== KonoSuba: God's Blessing on this Wonderful World! ===
No.	Title	Original release date	English release date
1	Oh! My Useless Goddess! Aa, Damegami-sama (あぁ、駄女神さま)	October 1, 2013; 978-4-04-101020-4	February 21, 2017; 978-0-316-55337-7
1. May I Go to a New World with This Self-Proclaimed Goddess! (この自称女神と異世界転生を！, Kono Jishō Megami to Isekai Tensei o!); 2. May There Be Treasure (By Which I Mean Panties) in This Right Hand! (この右手にお宝(ぱんつ)を！, Kono Migite ni Pantsu o!); 3. May the Self-Proclaimed Goddess Have Her First Pressing at This Lake! (この湖に自称女神の一番絞りを！, Kono Mizuumi ni Jishō Megami no Ichiban Shibori o!); 4. May There Be an End to This Useless Battle! (このろくでもない戦いに決着を！, Kono Rokudemonai Tatakai ni Ketchaku o!)
After meeting an untimely death, Kazuma Satō is greeted by the goddess Aqua who offers to send him to a reality with MMORPG elements to battle the Devil King there. Given the choice of anything with which to arm himself, Kazuma chooses Aqua herself and the two are teleported to a town called Axel where they recruit two other party members: Megumin and Darkness. As the party completes quests to earn money for their daily life, their actions anger one of the Devil King's generals, Dullahan, who attacks the town but is thwarted by Kazuma and Aqua's efforts.
2	Love, Witches & Other Delusions! Chūnibyō demo Majo ga Shitai! (中二病でも魔女がしたい！)	December 1, 2013; 978-4-04-101110-2	April 18, 2017; 978-0-316-46870-1
1. May I Trade with These True Friends! (この真の仲間達とトレードを！, Kono Shin no Nakama-tachi to Torēdo o!); 2. May There Be Peace for the Master of This Maze! (この迷宮の主に安らぎを！, Kono Meikyū no Nushi ni Yasuragi o!); 3. May Love Reach Out to This Ghost Girl! (この幽霊少女に愛の手を！, Kono Yūrei Shōjo ni Ai no Te o!); 4. God's Blessing on This Wonderful Shop! (この素晴らしい店に祝福を！, Kono Subarashii Mise ni Shukufuku o!); 5. May We Do Away with This Outrageous Fortress! (この理不尽な要塞に終焔！, Kono Rifujin no Yōsai ni Shūen o!)
The volume covers the party's daily life: Kazuma is killed while on a quest hunting snow fairies and is revived by Aqua; Kazuma and Dust swap parties for a day, with the former successfully completing his quest and the latter's ending in disaster; Kazuma and Aqua explore a dungeon and help an old couple pass into the afterlife; Kazuma visits Wiz and takes a request to exorcise a mansion and their success allows the party to use the mansion as a home; Kazuma hires a succubus to induce a nocturnal emission but fails due to Aqua's barrier. When a mobile fortress, the Destroyer, threatens Axel, Kazuma leads his party to counter the attack, only to inadvertently destroy a noble's house, consequently landing him with a warrant for his arrest.
3	You're Being Summoned, Darkness; Yondemasu yo, Dakunesu-san. (よんでますよ、ダクネスさん。)	March 1, 2014; 978-4-04-101242-0	August 22, 2017; 978-0-316-46873-2
1. May I Be Saved from This Unfair Trial! (この不当な裁判に救援を！, Kono Futō na Saiban ni Kyūen o!); 2. May There Be a Friend for This Crimson Magic Girl! (この紅魔の娘に友人を！, Kono Kōma no Musume ni Yūjin o!); 3. May There Be a Good Match for This Noble Daughter! (この貴族の令嬢に良縁を！, Kono Kizoku no Reijō ni Ryōen o!); 4. May This Masked Knight Submit! (この仮面の騎士に隷属を！, Kono Kamen no Kishi ni Reizoku o!)
The noble rigs the trial and condemns Kazuma to death. Darkness is forced to reveal her noble roots as the noble Lalatina to postpone the execution. In return, Lalatina is pressured into marrying the noble's son. The noble's son turns out to be a perfect gentleman so Kazuma and Aqua attempt to make the marriage meeting a success to prevent Lalatina's sadomasochistic dream from coming true. Instead, Lalatina counters by convincing people that Kazuma is her lover. Meanwhile, the court prosecutor accuses Kazuma for summoning monsters in the old couple's dungeon. Realizing the court may find Aqua's magic in the dungeon and use it as false evidence, the party enter the dungeon and defeat the Devil King's general, Vanir. Vindicated of his crimes, Vanir proposes a business deal with Kazuma.
4	You Good-for-Nothing Quartet; Namakura Karutetto (鈍ら四重奏)	May 1, 2014; 978-4-04-101570-4	December 12, 2017; 978-0-316-46876-3
1. May We Bid Farewell to This Troublesome Physical World! (この煩わしい外界にさよならを！, Kono Wazurawashii Gaikai ni Sayonara o!); 2. May There Be an Invitation for This Brazen Layabout! (このふてぶてしい鈍らに招待を！, Kono Futebuteshii Namakura ni Shōtai o!); 3. May We Sightsee in This Pathetic Town! (この痛々しい街で観光を！, Kono Itaitashii Machi de Kankō o!); 4. May We Be Saved from This Suspicious Incident! (この怪しい事件に救援を！, Kono Ayashii Jiken ni Kyūen o!); 5. May There Be a Goddess in This Impure Town! (この不浄な温泉街に女神を！, Kono Fujō na Onsengai ni Megami o!)
In return for patenting technological knowledge Kazuma has from Japan, Vanir offers him a large amount of money after production. Feeling set for life, Kazuma's party and Wiz visit the hot springs in Alcanretia - a town which serves as a base for the infamous Axis Church; an aggressive and disillusioned cult that reveres Aqua. There, they encounter the Devil King's general, Hans, who attempts to poison the hot springs to destroy the town's source of income. With Aqua's insistence, the party kills Hans and return to Axel.
5	Crimson Magic Clan, Let's & Go!! Bakuretsu Kōma ni Rettsu & Gō!! (爆裂紅魔にレッツ&ゴー!!)	September 1, 2014; 978-4-04-101571-1	April 24, 2018; 978-0-316-46878-7
1. May There Be Resolution Because of This Grave Letter! (この由由しい手紙に決断を！, Kono Yuyushii Tegami ni Ketsudan o!); 2. May I Make a Harem of These Lustful Beast-Eared Girls! (この姦しい獣耳少女達とハーレムを！, Kono Kashimashii Kemonomimi Shōjo-tachi to Hāremu o!); 3. May We Get Some R&R in This Pitiful Village! (この痛ましい里で休息を！, Kono Itamashii Sato de Kyūsoku o!); 4. May I Have a Just Cause for This Sleepless Night! (この寝苦しい夜に大義名分を！, Kono Negurushii Yoru ni Taigimeibun o!); 5. May There Be an Explosion for This Hateful Relic! (この恨めしい遺物に爆焔を！, Kono Urameshii Ibutsu ni Bakuen o!); Final: "I Want the Strongest Wizard" (『欲しいのは最強の魔法使い』, "Hoshii no wa Saikyō no Mahōtsukai")
The party learns from Yunyun that the Crimson Demon village is under attack by one of Devil King's generals, Sylvia. At Megumin's request, the party follows Yunyun to the village. There, Kazuma makes advances towards Megumin and learns that a Japanese man created the Crimson Demons - along with weaponry to counter the Devil King's attacks. Sylvia attacks the village but is defeated with a gun left behind by the Japanese man. Once the party returns home, Kazuma receives a letter from a princess who wishes to meet him.
6	Princess of the Six Flowers; Rokka no Ōjo (六花の王女)	March 1, 2015; 978-4-04-102267-2	August 21, 2018; 978-0-316-46880-0
1. May We Celebrate This Bright Future! (この明るい未来に祝杯を！, Kono Akarui Mirai ni Shukuhai o!); 2. May I Reeducate This Intelligent Girl! (この賢い少女に再教育を！, Kono Kashikoi Shōjo ni Saikyōiku o!); 3. May There Be Divine Punishment for This Dashing Thief! (このイケメン義賊に天誅を！, Kono Ikemen Gizoku ni Tenchū o!); 4. May There Be Bad Influences for This Sheltered Princess! (この箱入り王女に悪友を！, Kono Hakoiri Ōjo ni Akuyū o!); 5. May We Stop These Accursed Plans! (この忌々しい企みに終止符を！, Kono Imaimashii Takurami ni Shūshifu o!); Final: To Become a True Big Brother (本当の兄になるために, Hontō no Ani ni Naru Tame ni) Interlude: The Voracious Noble and the Broken Demon (強欲貴族と壊れた悪魔, Gōyoku Kizoku to Kowareta Akuma) Epilogue 1: A Hero's Reward (勇者に与えられる報酬は, Yūsha ni Ataerareru Hōshū wa) Epilogue 2: Instead of a Dream, I Got a Ring (夢の代わりに残った指輪, Yume no Kawari ni Nokotta Yubiwa)
As word of their victories against the Devil King spreads, Kazuma eagerly seizes an audience with the Crown. With the King called away by the endless war, they are received by the insatiably curious Princess Iris. In the capital, they find the nobility in uproar as the empire's wealth vanishes into the clutches of the Chivalrous Thief. Though he catches the thief, Kazuma reluctantly admits failure when he discovers the culprit is none other than Chris, who is attempting to steal a holy body-swapping relic before it is used for malicious intent. His shame is only compounded when he is slain during a routine skirmish with the Devil King's army. Disgraced and exiled, Kazuma is forced to infiltrate the royal castle alongside Chris - without his party - when a conspiracy to impersonate the royal family is uncovered...
7	110-Million Bride; Okusenman no Hanayome (億千万の花嫁)	September 1, 2015; 978-4-04-103539-9	December 11, 2018; 978-0-316-46882-4
1. May Even These Rising-Star Adventurers Catch a Break! (この成り上がり冒険者にも安息を！, Kono Nariagari Bōkensha ni mo Ansoku o!); 2. May There Be Eternal Slumber for the Lord of the Lake! (この湖の主に永遠の眠りを！, Kono Mizuumi no Nushi ni Eien no Nemuri o!); 3. May I Lecture This Runaway Girl! (この家出娘に説教を！, Kono Iede Musume ni Sekkyou o!); 4. May I Have One Last Night with This Noble Daughter! (この令嬢と最後の夜を！, Kono Reijō to Saigo no Yoru o!); 5. God's Blessing on This Beautiful Bride! (この花嫁に祝福を！, Kono Hanayome ni Shukufuku o!); Interlude: Demons Cackle in the Night (悪魔達は夜更けに嗤う, Akuma-tachi wa Yofuke ni Warau) Epilogue 1: Welcome Home! (お帰り！, Okaeri!) Epilogue 2: Eris and Chris (エリスとクリス, Erisu to Kurisu)
Lord Dustiness falls ill and, in order to save the family from debts, Darkness agrees to marry the landlord Alderp Alexei Barnes and quit adventurer. Kazuma and the group rescue Darkness from the wedding while Aqua manages to heal Lord Dustiness, whose illness is revealed to be a demon's curse. Vanir discovers Alderp had made a pact with a demon named Maxwell in order to curse Lord Dustiness and had defrauded everyone with the demon's help. Vanir reminds Maxwell that he is owed payment for the pact so Maxwell drags Alderp to Hell to collect it. To outsiders, it appears Alderp had fled because of shame.
8	Axis Cult vs. Eris Cult; Akushizu Kyōdan vs Erisu Kyōdan (アクシズ教団VSエリス教団)	January 1, 2016; 978-4-04-103540-5	April 23, 2019; 978-0-316-46885-5
1. May There Be Honor for This Dragon! (このドラゴンに栄光を！, Kono Doragon ni Eikō o!); 2. May There Be a Master for This Sacred Armor! (この聖鎧にご主人様を！, Kono Seigai ni Goshujin-sama o!); 3. May Everything Be Left to This Capable Advisor! (この敏腕アドバイザーにお任せを！, Kono Binwan Adobaizā ni Omakase o!); 4. May There Be Shining Flowers in the Sky Tonight! (この夜空に輝く華を！, Kono Yozora ni Kagayaku Hana o!); 5. May There Be a Legend for This Beginner Town! (この駆け出しの街に伝説を！, Kono Kakedashi no Machi ni Densetsu o!); Epilogue 1: May There Be Thanks and Blessings for This Goddess! (女神に感謝と祝福を！, Megami ni Kansha to Shukufuku o!) Epilogue 2: After the Festival (祭りが終わったその後で, Matsuri ga Owatta Sono Ato de)
Aqua gets jealous of the Eris Festival that will happen in Axel, so she decides to host an Aqua Festival. Kazuma figures out the thief Chris is the goddess Eris in disguise and they team up to try to steal and seal a holy relic, the Sacred Armor Aigis, but they fail in the first attempt. Kazuma ends up having to help create stalls for the Aqua Festival and her cultists. As Kazuma and Chris discover that Aigis has a conscience and is a pervert, they convince the organizers to hold a Beauty Contest on the last day of the festival in order to lure the armor. The Sacred Armor is attracted by the event but refuses to surrender because the girls aren't attractive enough for it. Chris drops the disguise and joins the contest as Goddess Eris, and the crowd goes unruly because of the divine appearance. Aigis accepts that Eris is beautiful enough, lets her wear the armor, and helps her get away from the crowd.
9	Crimson Fate; Kurenai no Shukumei (紅の宿命)	July 1, 2016; 978-4-04-103954-0	August 27, 2019; 978-1-9753-8503-3
1. May We Take Joy in These Normal Days! (この平穏な日々に喜びを！, Kono Heion na Hibi ni Yorokobi o!); 2. May There Be Growth for These Unchanging Adventurers! (この変わらぬ冒険者達に成長を！, Kono Kawaranu Bōkensha-tachi ni Seichō o!); 3. A Night's Dream with This Red-Haired Beauty! (この赤髪美女と一夜の夢を！, Kono Akagami Bijo to Ichiya no Yume o!); 4. Prayers for These Glory-less Gods! (この威光なき神々に聖なる祈りを！, Kono Ikō-naki Kamigami ni Seinaru Inori o!); Final: An Explosion on This Fated Dark God! (この宿命の邪神に爆焔を！, Kono Shukumei no Jashin ni Bakuen o!) Epilogue 1: For a Certain Someone (あの人のために, Ano Hito no Tame ni) Epilogue 2: Dear Elder Brother (拝啓、お兄様へ, Haikei, Onii-sama e)
Kazuma and his group become aware of an evil goddess and Devil King general named Wolbach. The party goes to a fortress located on the frontlines, which is being attacked by Wolbach with guerrilla attacks via explosion magic and teleportation, to gain enough fame and recognition to legitimately visit Iris. Megumin, Kazuma, and Yunyun retaliate against Wolbach, who is revealed to be the mentor who taught Megumin of Explosion magic.
10	Gamble Scramble! Gyanburu Sukeranburu! (ギャンブル・スクランブル！)	November 1, 2016; 978-4-04-104992-1	December 17, 2019; 978-1-9753-3234-1
1. A Claim on This Abrupt Marriage Talk! (この唐突な婚約話にクレームを！, Kono Tōtotsu na Kon'yakubanashi ni Kurēmu o!); 2. An Education for These Sheltered Girls! (この箱入り娘達に教育を！, Kono Hakoiri Musume-tachi ni Kyōiku o!); 3. A Punishment for This Outrageous Fiancé! (この不届きな婚約者に制裁を！, Kono Futodoki na Kon'yakusha ni Seibai o!); 4. Praise for This Martial Princess! (この武闘派王女に称賛を！, Kono Butōha Ōjo ni Shōsan o!); 5. A Full Stop for This Ridiculous Plan! (このロクでもない陰謀に終止符を！, Kono Rokudemonai Inbō ni Shūshifu o!)
Upon receiving a letter from the capital regarding Iris' marriage meeting in the neighboring nation of Elroad, Kazuma acts as her bodyguard for the meeting. On their arrival, Kazuma finds out that the true motive behind the Iris' meeting was to secure defense funding from Elroad, which was to be used in the war effort against the Devil King. To secure the funds, Kazuma and Iris resort to gambling as Elroad's prince is hesitant to provide financial support for suspicious reasons.
11	The Archwizard's Little Sister; Dai Mahoutsukai no Imouto (大魔法使いの妹)	May 1, 2017; 978-4-04-104993-8	April 28, 2020; 978-1-9753-3237-2
1. An Awakening for This LoliNEET! (このロリコンニートの覚醒を！, Kono Rorikon Nīto no Kakusei o!); 2. Retribution for This Roommate! (この同居人に人誅を！, Kono Dōkyonin ni Jinchū o!); 3. A Goddess's Mercy for This Pious Believer! (この敬虔な信徒に女神の慈悲を！, Kono Keiken na Shinto ni Megami no Jihi o!); 4. A Score to Settle with This Nasty Monster! (この悪辣なモンスターと決着を！, Kono Akuratsu na Monsutā to Ketchaku o!); Final: Back to Basics with These Adventurers! (この冒険者達と共に原点回帰を！, Kono Bōkensha-tachi to Tomo ni Gentenkaiki o!)
When his party returns to Axel, Kazuma elects to stay with Iris, but is quickly teleported back home at the demands of Iris' guards. Upon returning, Kazuma discovers he is locked out of his mansion by Aqua, who is unhappy with his decision to remain in the capital; with Megumin's help (and the assistance of the police), he successfully reclaims the mansion. Megumin's sister Komekko eventually arrives in Axel to escape the Devil King, where she provides moral support to Kazuma's party and the city's adventurers.
12	The Knight's Lullaby; Onna Kishi no Rarabai (女騎士のララバイ)	July 24, 2017; 978-4-04-105005-7	October 20, 2020; 978-1-9753-3238-9
1. Relief for This Ill Illegitimate Child! (この病弱な隠し子に安らぎを！, Kono Byōjaku na Kakushigo ni Yasuragi o!); 2. Despair for These Nouveaux Riches! (この成金達に絶望を！, Kono Narikin-tachi ni Zetsubō o!); 3. Closure for These Feelings! (この想いに決着を！, Kono Omoi ni Ketchaku o!); 4. May We Extend a Loving Hand to This Orphanage! (この孤児院に愛の手を！, Kono Kojiin ni Ai no Te o!); 5. A Banquet for This Demon Count! (この悪魔伯と饗宴を！, Kono Akuma-haku to Kyōen o!); Final: Eris's Blessing for This Crusader! (このクルセイダーにエリスの加護を！, Kono Kuruseidā ni Erisu no Kago o!) Epilogue: This Way Forever (このままずっと, Kono Mama Zutto)
There's a new girl in town! And for some reason, she keeps calling Darkness "Mama". But there's a perfectly reasonable explanation for that...right? So while that gets sorted out, Darkness has taxes to collect! It's time for the high-income adventurers to pay their dues and Kazuma's at the top of the list. Naturally, one night after a long game of Cat and Mouse: Tax Evasion Edition, they find themselves handcuffed together, and Darkness sees it as the perfect opportunity to ask Kazuma a burning question."...Do you like Megumin?"
13	The Lich's Proposal; Ritchī e no Chōsen-jō (リッチーへの挑戦状)	December 1, 2017; 978-4-04-106109-1	February 23, 2021; 978-1-9753-3240-2
1. God's Blessing on This Meeting with a Treasure Island! (この宝島との出会いに祝福を！, Kono Takarajima to no Deai ni Shukufuku o!); 2. Divine Punishment for This Harem Protagonist! (このハーレム主人公に天罰を！, Kono Hāremu Shujinkō ni Tenbatsu o!); 3. Salvation for This Stalking Victim! (このストーカー被害者に救済を！, Kono Sutōkā Higaisha ni Kyūsai o!); 4. A Goddess's Cheerleading for This Man's Man! (この漢に女神の声援を！, Kono Otoko ni Megami no Seien o!); Final: The Impact of True Love for This Lich! (このリッチーに真摯な愛を！, Kono Ritchī ni Shinshi na Ai o!)
14	The Crimson Magic Trials; Kouma no Shiren (紅魔の試練)	July 1, 2018; 978-4-04-106111-4	June 22, 2021; 978-1-9753-3242-6
1. Divine Wrath for This Holy Armor! (この聖鎧に天罰を！, Kono Seigai ni Tenbatsu o!); 2. The Real, True Truth for This Artificial Tribe! (この人造種族に真実を！, Kono Jinzō Shuzoku ni Shinjitsu o!); 3. Some Rest During This Brief Normal Life! (このひとときの日常に安らぎを！, Kono Hitotoki no Nichijō ni Yasuragi o!); 4. Closure for These Lifelong Rivals! (この宿命のライバル達に決着を！, Kono Shukumei no Raibaru-tachi ni Ketchaku o!); Final: And So Begins Our Epic tale of Heroism (そして始まる英雄譚, Soshite Hajimaru Eiyūtan)
15	Cult Syndrome; Jakyō Shindorōmu (邪教シンドローム)	November 1, 2018; 978-4-04-107554-8	October 26, 2021; 978-1-9753-3244-0
Prologue: 1. Divine Punishment for This Priest! (この聖女に天罰を！, Kono Seijo ni Tenbatsu o!); 2. Divine Punishment for This NEET, Too! (このニートにも天罰を！, Kono Nīto ni mo Tenbatsu o!); 3. A Goddess's Blessing for This Puppet! (この傀儡に女神の加護を！, Kono Kugutsu ni Megami no Kago o!); 4. A Calling for This Adventurer! (この冒険者に命題を！, Kono Bōkensha ni Meidai o!); Final: A Farewell for This Starter Town! (この駆け出しの街に決別を！, Kono Kakedashi no Machi ni Ketsubetsu o!) Epilogue
One of the Demon King's generals, Seresdina, appears in Axel and began to steal Aqua's popularity. At first, Kazuma and Seresdina makes a non-aggression pact, with Kazuma joining to Seresdina's religion, but after a situation in the city that makes Aqua sad, Kazuma breaks their pact and decides to harass Seresdina. To defeat her, Kazuma uses a potion to reset her levels to level 1, and because of an effect of her religion, the same happens to him. After receiving a message from Eris, Kazuma asks Aqua if she wants to return to Heaven. For the next few days, Aqua tries to convince Kazuma to fight against the Demon King, but after a situation with Wiz and a night-talk with Kazuma, Aqua decides to go against the Demon King by herself.
16	Runaway Goddess, Come Home! Dassō Megami, Gō Hōmu! (脱走女神、ゴーホーム！)	August 1, 2019; 978-4-04-108520-2	April 19, 2022; 978-1-9753-4204-3
1. A Search for This Runaway Goddess! (この家出女神の捜索を！, Kono Iede Megami no Sōsaku o!); Intermission: Useless Goddess Theater (1) (駄女神劇場①, Damegami Gekijō 1): 2. A Dungeon for This No-Life King! (この不死の王にダンジョンを！, Kono Fushi no Ō ni Danjon o!); Intermission: Useless Goddess Theater (2) (駄女神劇場②, Damegami Gekijō 2): 3. Finally, a Cheat for This HikiNEET! (この引きニートに今こそチートを！, Kono Hiki-nīto ni Imakoso Chīto o!); Intermission: Useless Goddess Theater (3) (駄女神劇場③, Damegami Gekijō 3): 4. May We Settle Matters with This Dark Goddess's Servant! (この邪神の使徒と決着を！, Kono Jashin no Shito to Ketchaku o!); Intermission: Useless Goddess Theater (4) (駄女神劇場④, Damegami Gekijō 4): 5. A Full Stop for This Journey! (この旅路に終止符を！, Kono Tabiji ni Shūshifu o!); Epilogue
After Aqua leaves the mansion, the adventurers of Axel decides to send some of their group to search for her, but Kazuma and his party decides to stay in the city, mainly because of Kazuma's reverting to level 1. Kazuma discovers that because he has no talent, he can raise his level faster than other adventurers and also maintain his skills. Kazuma decides to go to the hardest dungeon in this world alongside Vanir and Wiz, who can drain his levels, and learn more skills to fight against the Demon King. At the same time, the novel explores Aqua's misadventures in her campaign against the Demon King.
17	God's Blessing on These Wonderful Adventurers! Kono Bōkenshatachi ni Shukufuku o! (この冒険者たちに祝福を！)	May 1, 2020; 978-4-04-109543-0	August 2, 2022; 978-1-9753-4310-1
1. An Explosion for This Wizard! (この魔法使いに爆焔を！, Kono Mahōtsukai ni Bakuen o!); 2. Good Luck for This Goddess! (この女神に幸運を！, Kono Megami ni Kōun o!); 3. Applause for This Paladin! (この聖騎士に喝采を！, Kono Seikishi ni Kassai o!); 4. Glory for This Adventurer! (この冒険者に栄光を！, Kono Bōkensha ni Eikō o!); Epilogue
Kazuma and the rest of his party finally catch up to Aqua but it's too late as she had already entered the Demon King's castle. Kazuma then reveals his backup plan to break into the castle by using the manatites he bought from Vanir and having Megumin blast the Castle's barrier down with Explosion magic. The party is finally reunited and Kazuma goes forward to challenge the Demon King to defeat him and send Aqua back to heaven.

=== Consulting With This Masked Devil! ===
No.	Title	Japanese release date	Japanese ISBN
1	Consulting with This Masked Devil! Kono Kamen no Akuma ni Sōdan wo! (この仮面の悪魔に相談を！)	April 1, 2016	978-4-04-104293-9
1. Today at the Consulting Center (相談屋はじめました, Sōdanya Hajimemashita); 2. Today as a Follower (従者はじめました, Jūsha Hajimemashita); 3. Today as a Receptionist (受付嬢はじめました, Uketsukejō Hajimemashita); 4. Today as a Bodyguard (用心棒はじめました, Yōjinbō Hajimemashita); Final: Today as a Lich (リッチーはじめました, Ritchī Hajimemashita) Epilogue
Consulting with This Masked Devil! is set between the eighth and ninth novels of the main series, and features a series of vignettes following Vanir's life in Axel. Wanting to raise more money as his and Wiz's magic shop was struggling, Vanir opens a consulting center in the adventurers' guild. The spin-off also explores Wiz's own adventuring past, including her battles with Vanir and decision to become a lich.

=== KonoSuba: God's Blessing on this Wonderful World! Extra Attention to that Wonderful Fool! ===
No.	Title	Japanese release date	Japanese ISBN
1	Wonderful Supporting Role; Subarashiki kana, Mei Wakiyaku (素晴らしきかな、名脇役)	August 1, 2017	978-4-04-105816-9
Taking place between the 2nd and 4th volume of the main series. It tells the tales of Dust's exploit during his party member exchange between Kazuma. After that, Dust goes through various attempts at earning a lot of money quickly and live a frivolous life, which included: taking a magic sword and reselling it; attempting to make Darkness fall for him; and aiding the succubus shop when they're under investigation in exchange for free succubus dreams. However, all his plans failed and he ended up in prison for a week. After being released from prison, he finds out that his party members, due to being infuriated by Dust's antics, have replaced him with a new member as they set off for a quest, leaving Dust behind. While contemplating his actions, Dust discovers a dark plot that targets one of his party member, Lynn. He sets off together with the loli succubus and a helmeted noble to put a stop to the scheme.
2	Beyond the Distant Harem; Tōi Hāremu no Mukō ni (遠いハーレムの向こうに)	December 1, 2017	978-4-04-105817-6
Taking place between the 7th and 9th volume of the main series. The story begins with Dust's perspective of the battle against the kowloon hydra and his meeting with goddess Eris. Then, Dust and his party take on a quest to explore an abandoned dungeon. After not finding anything valuable in it and his party member Keith and Taylor suddenly feeling weak, Dust receives vouchers for a trip to Alcanretia from Kazuma. Dust invites his party members, Yunyun, the loli succubus, Vanir and Chris to the trip. After Dust's plans of using a magic item to make the girls fall for him failed and a squabble with the local Axis cultists, they all return from the trip only to find that everyone in Axel is suffering from the similar but more severe symptom that Keith and Taylor had. Deducing that something in the dungeon caused it, Dust and his party together with Yunyun and the loli succubus returned to the dungeon to solve the mystery.
3	Starry Sky for the Dreaming Princess; Yumemiru Hime ni Hoshizora o (夢見る姫に星空を)	July 1, 2018	978-4-04-106522-8
4	Unbeatable Gambler; Jōhai mu Masaru no Gyanburā (常敗無勝のギャンブラー)	November 1, 2018	978-4-04-106523-5
5	A Covenant With the White Dragon; Shiroki Ryuu tono Meiyaku (白き竜との盟約)	August 1, 2019	978-4-04-108250-8
6	Knight Vows to You; Kishi no Chikai o Anata ni (騎士の誓いをあなたに)	January 1, 2020	978-4-04-108251-5
7	Fools Loved by Dragons; Ryū ni Aisa Rreshi Gusha (竜に愛されし愚者)	May 1, 2020	978-4-04-108252-2
8	An Invitation from the Princess; Hime-sama Kara no Jōtaijō (姫様からの招待状)	February 28, 2026	978-4-04-117209-4

=== KonoSuba: God's Blessing on this Wonderful World! Fantastic Days ===
No.	Title	Original release date	English release date
1	Fantastic Days; Fantasutikku Deizu (ファンタスティックデイズ)	March 1, 2022; 978-4-04-109851-6	June 18, 2023; 978-1-9753-7113-5
Novelization of the app game, KonoSuba: Fantastic Days. Covers all the stories that were never told in the game.

== Manga ==
=== KonoSuba: God's Blessing on this Wonderful World! ===
No.	Original release date	Original ISBN	English release date	English ISBN
1	April 9, 2015	978-4-04-070539-2	November 22, 2016	978-0-316-55256-1
2	December 5, 2015	978-4-04-070782-2	February 21, 2017	978-0-316-55332-2
3	March 9, 2016	978-4-04-070834-8	April 18, 2017	978-0-316-46933-3
4	September 9, 2016	978-4-04-072019-7	July 18, 2017	978-0-316-55954-6
5	March 9, 2017	978-4-04-072212-2	November 14, 2017	978-0-316-41281-0
6	September 8, 2017	978-4-04-072433-1	May 22, 2018	978-1-9753-2649-4
7	March 9, 2018	978-4-04-072628-1	November 13, 2018	978-1-9753-2809-2
8	September 7, 2018	978-4-04-072881-0	April 30, 2019	978-1-9753-0416-4
9	April 9, 2019	978-4-04-073139-1	December 3, 2019	978-1-9753-5954-6
10	August 9, 2019	978-4-04-073293-0	March 24, 2020	978-1-9753-9947-4
11	April 9, 2020	978-4-04-073616-7	December 15, 2020	978-1-9753-1911-3
12	October 9, 2020	978-4-04-073834-5	November 9, 2021	978-1-9753-2532-9
13	May 8, 2021	978-4-04-074047-8	May 17, 2022	978-1-9753-4149-7
14	October 8, 2021	978-4-04-074273-1	December 13, 2022	978-1-9753-4820-5
15	May 9, 2022	978-4-04-074529-9	April 18, 2023	978-1-9753-6271-3
16	November 8, 2022	978-4-04-074751-4	October 18, 2023	978-1-9753-7683-3
17	July 7, 2023	978-4-04-075045-3	July 23, 2024	978-1-9753-9380-9
18	November 9, 2023	978-4-04-075198-6	December 10, 2024	979-8-8554-0173-8
19	June 7, 2024	978-4-04-075479-6	June 24, 2025	979-8-8554-1451-6
20	December 9, 2024	978-4-04-075710-0	February 24, 2026	979-8-8554-2315-0
21	July 9, 2025	978-4-04-076003-2	August 25, 2026	979-8-8554-3368-5
22	February 9, 2026	978-4-04-076265-4	—	—
23	August 7, 2026	978-4-04-076511-2	—	—
