= Cabra cabriola =

Portuguese and Brazilian fictive man-eating goatlike monster

A cabra cabriola or cabra-cabriola (literally "leaping nanny goat" (Note: Putnam (translator) at Freyre (1986), n190.)) is an imaginary bogeyman type being from Portuguese myth told to children, whose legend is also told in other parts of the Iberian Peninsula and Brazil.

It is imagined to be a fire-breathing, sharp toothed, but goat-like, child-eating beast.

== Legend ==
The cabra cabriola is said to be a man-eating goat, said to leap and buck a thousand times (hence the name, from cabriolar "to prance, caper"). (Note: "Cabra antropófaga, dando mil saltos e curvas (cabriolando)")

The cabra cabriola is considered a bogeyman monster that terrifies children into good behavior. It is said to be armed with huge jaws and sharp teeth used to devour youngsters, breathing fire from its eyes, mouth, and nostrils, while it bellows out its standard chant:

Eu sou a cabra cabriola
Que como meninos aos pares
Também comerei a vós
Uns carochinhos de nada

—Pereira da Costa, Francisco Augusto (1908)
Translation:

I am the Leaping Goat,
Who eats laddies by the pairs,
And I will eat you too,
Nothing but a few wee bugsies.

The wording of the chant may vary according to versions. (Note: Another version in a lullaby anthology runs as follows: Cabra cabriola Corre montes e vales, Corre meninos a pares Tamêm te comerá a ti Se cá chegares —Leite de Vasconcelos, José (1907). Translation: I Leaping Goat, Race through mountains and vales, And I shall eat you too, If you happen to arrive hither.)

In one narrative, the Portuguese mother must leave her three children home at night to go to work, and tells them never to let anyone in unless they recognize her voice. Her advice works the first time around when the cabra cabriola arrives and utters the aforementioned chant, because the beast uses its natural thick voice, and is shunned by children. Undeterred, the beast hides in wait until the mother returns, and learns the manner of her speech, then goes to the blacksmith to re-forge his tongue in order to replicate the woman's soft voice. He arrives back, and now says:

Filhinhos, filhinhos,
Abri-me a porta,
Qu'eu sou vossa mãe;
Trago lenha nas costas,
Sal na moleira,
Fogo nos olhos,
Agua na bocca,
E leite nos peitos
Para vos criar.

—Pereira da Costa, Francisco Augusto (1908)
Translation:

Children, children ,
Open the door for me,
This is your mother,
I carry firewood on my back,
Salt on my head,
Fire in my eyes,
Mouthful of water,
And milk in my breasts,
To raise you.

and the unfortunate children believing it to be their mother, open the door and are devoured.

There are numerous other folktales surrounding the creature. In another tale localized in the Algarve region of Portugal, a poor widow tells her children to hide under the bed as she leaves for work, and secured the door closed with a pin. But the cabra cabiola entered the home. The woman got a ill-feeling hunch and returned home to find the door locked from within, and peering through the keyhole she espied the cabra cabiola. She told the goat to "Jump out of there", but the goat refused in verse (similar to his cliché chant). The woman was too afraid to confront it, so first hired a fox (for the payment of a rooster) and then a wolf (for a lamb) but both of them turned scared and retreated. Then the ant offered help, in return for sopinhas (soup) of honey and oil, which was in the house, so it could only be paid if it succeeded. Though tiny, the ant stung the cabra cabriola on the belly and it fled in pain screaming: baa, baa. (Note: Portuguese: bé, bé)

== Parallels ==
As a bogeyman-type device for frightening children into obedience, the "Cabra Cabriola" of Brazil (Note: Souto Maior (1988): "Terrível papão para medir medo aos meninos e contêlos nas suas travessuras (A terrible bogeyman to instill fear in children and make them refrain themselves from causing mischief)". The term papão or pt:bicho-papão is the Portuguese equivalent of boogeyman.) (and the Portuguese language sphere) is named alongside the Lupishomens (Lobisomem, i.e. werewolf), the Papa-figo (var. Papa-meninos), the Mula (i.e., Mula-de-padre, the priest's mule or concubine which is equated with the Mula-sem-cabeça the Headless Mule), (Note: Cascudo also likens the cabra cabriola with the Mula imported from far away.) the Curupira, the Caapora (Caipora), and the Cuca (Coco).

Gilberto Freyre conjectures that the origins of the cabra cabriola may be traced back to the lore of the Caprimulgus (nightjar, but literally "goat-milker") which goes on forays during the night to milk nanny-goats as well as eat children.

== See also ==
- Chupacabra, the "goat-sucker" monster of Latin America
- Maria da Manta, devilish Maria, figure in Portuguese folklore
- Mão Pelada, "bare handed" in one front paw, a ravenous creature in Brazilian lore (shares Portuguese name for crab-eating raccoon)
- Mula sem cabeça - headless mule
- Papa-figo, a bogeyman type figure
