= Brad R. Roth =

American political scientist

- Education: Swarthmore College (BA); Columbia University (LLM); Harvard University (JD); University of California, Berkeley (PhD)
- Awards: Certificate of Merit, American Society of International Law, 1999
- Scientific career
- Fields: Political Theory, International Law
- Workplaces: Wayne State University (Professor of Law, 1997–present); University of California, Berkeley (Visiting Professor of Law, 1996–1997)
- Doctoral advisor: Martin Shapiro, Jeremy Waldron

Brad Richard Roth is an American political scientist. He is a professor of political science and law at Wayne State University in Detroit, Michigan.

== Biography ==
His research has focused on international law, political theory, and human rights. He received a B.A. from Swarthmore College, a J.D. from Harvard Law School, an LL.M. from Columbia Law School, and a PhD from the University of California at Berkeley. He has been described by James Gathii as a neoconservative realist in reference to Roth's book Governmental Illegitimacy in International Law.. This description has been rejected by Roth in his response to Gathii's review. Roth acknowledges that certain aspects of his book could be portrayed as conservative, "in the limited sense that it seeks to rationalize and bolster the conception of international legal order, premised on the twin principles of self-determination of peoples and non-intervention in international affairs..." Additionally, he grants the book is realist, "to the extent that it takes states (qua political communities entitled to self-government) seriously as units of the international system, and that it treats skeptically efforts to superimpose idealist blueprints on complex and unruly realities." Roth calls the use of the term neoconservative "especially troubling" as it implies an association with an American right-wing movement which "stands for propositions diametrically opposed to the book's central arguments."

== Scholarship ==
Brad R. Roth's books include Governmental Illegitimacy in International Law (Oxford University Press), Democratic Governance and International Law (edited with Greg Fox, Cambridge University Press), and a forthcoming book on sovereignty. In recent years, Brad Roth has advised the government of Taiwan, including President Chen Shui-bian, on issues of sovereignty and independence from China under international law.

== Activism ==
Roth has been a strong critic of U.S. foreign policy in Nicaragua during the 1970s and 1980s, and supporter of Palestinian rights and a two-state solution. In recent years, he has also emerged as a strong critic of torture policies advocated by people such as John Yoo.
