= Shrunken head =

Specially prepared human head

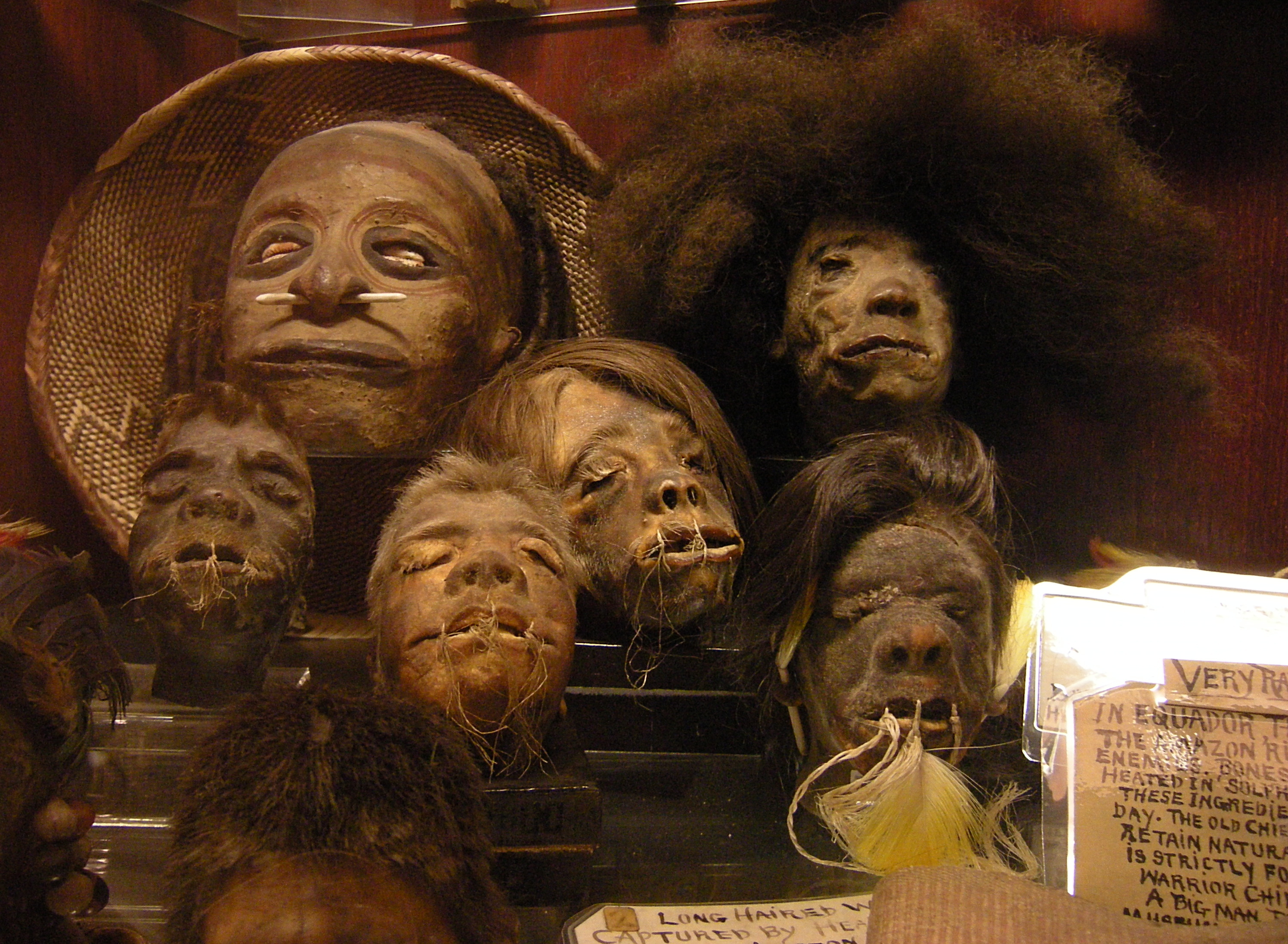
Shrunken heads in the permanent collection of Ye Olde Curiosity Shop in Seattle

A shrunken head is a severed and specially prepared human head with the skull removed – many times smaller than its original size – that is used for trophy, ritual, trade, or other purposes.

Headhunting is believed to have occurred in many regions of the world since time immemorial, but the practice of head shrinking has only been documented in the northwestern region of the Amazon rainforest. Jivaroan peoples, which includes the Shuar, Achuar, Huambisa and Aguaruna tribes from Ecuador and Peru, are known to keep shrunken human heads. While many were probably made from the remains of these people, the Shuar people are the only culture in the world that practiced ritualistic head shrinking.

Shuar people call a shrunken head a tsantsa, also transliterated tzantza. Many tribe leaders would display their heads to scare enemies.

Shrunken heads are known for their mandibular prognathism, facial distortion, and shrinkage of the lateral sides of the forehead; these are artifacts of the shrinking process. Among the Shuar, the reduction of the heads was followed by a series of feasts centered on important rituals.

== Technique ==
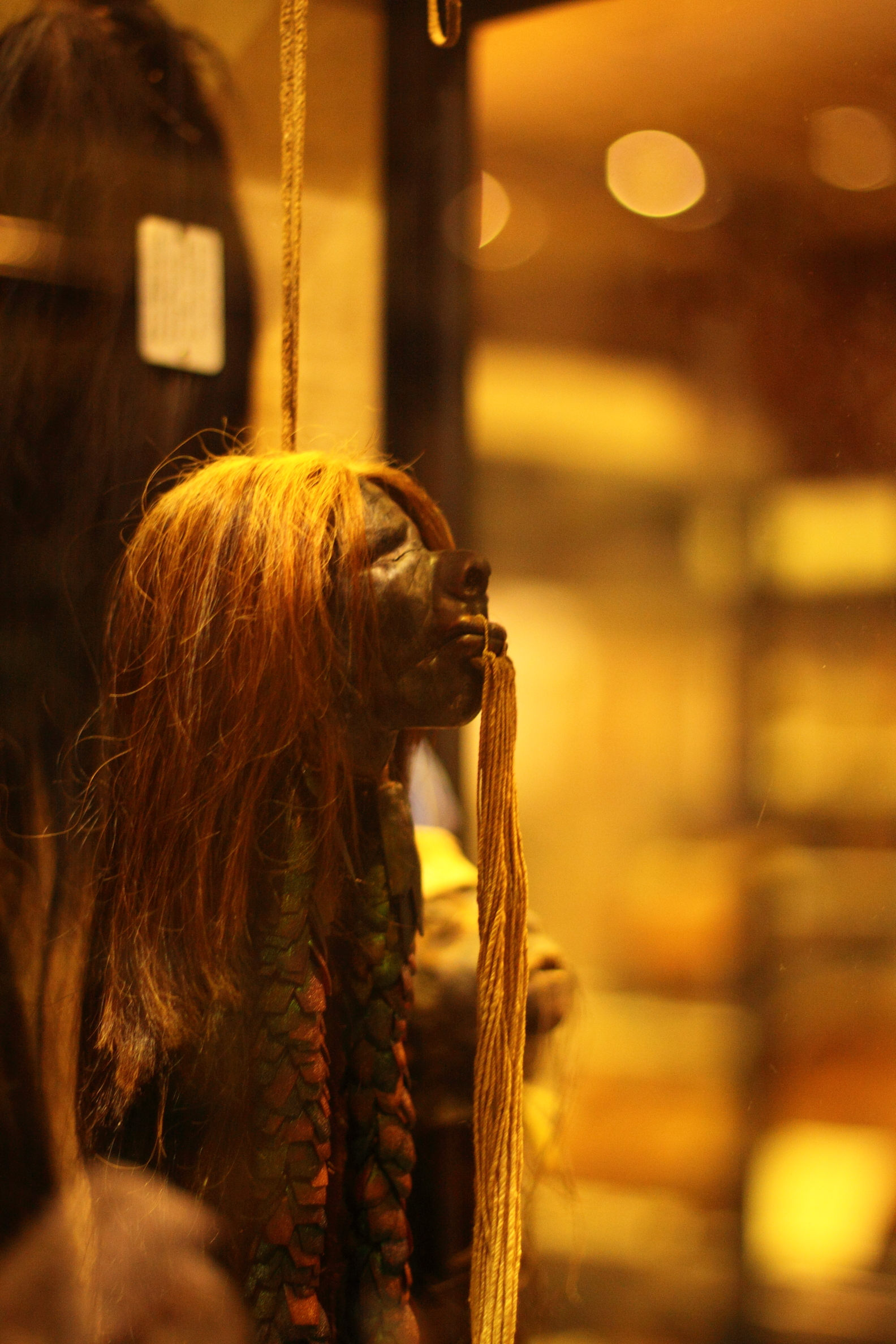
Shrunken head from the Shuar people, formerly on display in the Pitt Rivers Museum in Oxford

The process of creating a shrunken head begins with removing the skull from the neck. Then an incision is made on the back of the ear and all the skin and flesh is removed from the cranium. Red seeds are placed underneath the nostrils and the lips are sewn shut. The mouth is held together with three palm pins. Fat from the flesh of the head is removed. Then a wooden ball is placed under the flesh to keep the form. The flesh is then boiled in water that has been saturated with a number of herbs containing tannins. The head is then dried with hot rocks and sand while molding it to retain its human features. The skin is then rubbed with charcoal ash. Decorative beads may be added to the head.

In the head shrinking tradition, it is believed that coating the skin in ash keeps the muisak, or avenging soul, from seeping out.

== Significance ==
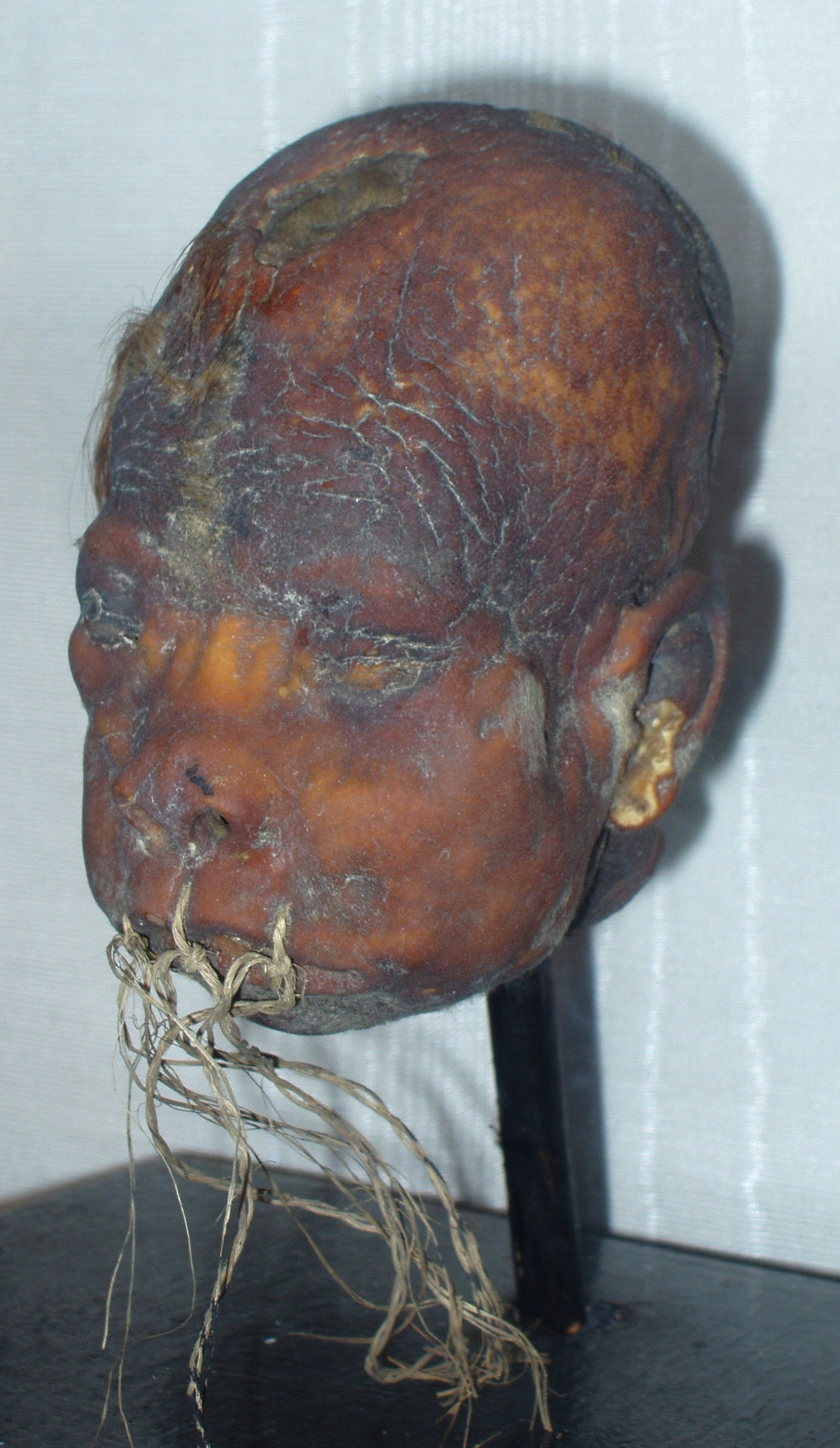
Shrunken head exhibited at the Lightner Museum in St. Augustine, Florida

The practice of preparing shrunken heads originally had religious significance; shrinking the head of an enemy was believed to harness the spirit of that enemy and compel them to serve the shrinker. It was said to prevent the soul from avenging their death.

Shuar believed in the existence of three fundamental spirits:

- Wakani – innate to humans thus surviving their death.
- Arutam – literally "vision" or "power", protects humans from a violent death.
- Muisak – vengeful spirit, which surfaces when a person carrying an Arutam spirit is murdered.

To block a Muisak spirit from using its powers, they severed their enemies' heads and shrank them. The process also served as a way of warning their enemies. Despite these precautions, the owner of the trophy did not keep it for long. Many heads were later used in religious ceremonies and feasts that celebrated the victories of the tribe. Accounts vary as to whether the heads were discarded or stored.

== Trade ==
When Westerner curio collectors created an economic incentive for shrunken heads, there was a sharp increase in the rate of killings in an effort to supply tourists and collectors of ethnographic items. The terms 'headhunting' and 'headhunting parties' come from this practice.

Guns were usually what the Shuar acquired in exchange for their shrunken heads, the rate being one gun per head. But weapons were not the only items exchanged. Around 1910, shrunken heads were being sold by a curio shop in Lima for one Peruvian gold pound, equal in value to a British gold sovereign (equivalent to $102 in 2025). By 1919, the price in Panama's curio shop for shrunken heads had risen to £5. By the 1930s, when heads were freely exchanged, a shrunken head could be purchased for about 25 U.S. dollars. This was stopped when the Peruvian and Ecuadorian governments cooperated to outlaw head trafficking.

Also encouraged by this trade, people in Colombia and Panama unconnected to the Jívaros began to make counterfeit tsantsas. They used corpses from morgues, or the heads of monkeys or sloths. Some used goatskin. Kate Duncan wrote in 2001, "It has been estimated that about 80 percent of the tsantsas in private and museum hands are fraudulent", including almost all that are female or include an entire torso rather than just a head.

Thor Heyerdahl recounts in The Kon-Tiki Expedition (1948) the various problems of getting into the Jívaro (Shuar) area in Ecuador to get balsa wood for his expedition raft. Local people would not guide his team into the jungle for fear of being killed and having their heads shrunk. In 1951 and 1952 sales of such items in London were being advertised in The Times; one example was priced at $250, a hundredfold appreciation since the early 20th century.

In 1999, the National Museum of the American Indian repatriated the authentic shrunken heads in its collection to Ecuador. Most other countries have also banned the trade. Currently, replica shrunken heads are manufactured as curios for the tourist trade. These are made from leather and animal hides formed to resemble the originals. In 2019 Mercer University repatriated a shrunken head from its collections, crediting the Native American Graves Protection and Repatriation Act as inspiration.

In 2020, the Pitt Rivers Museum of Oxford University removed its collection of shrunken heads after an ethical review begun in 2017, as part of an effort to decolonize its collections and avoid stereotyping.

== In popular culture ==
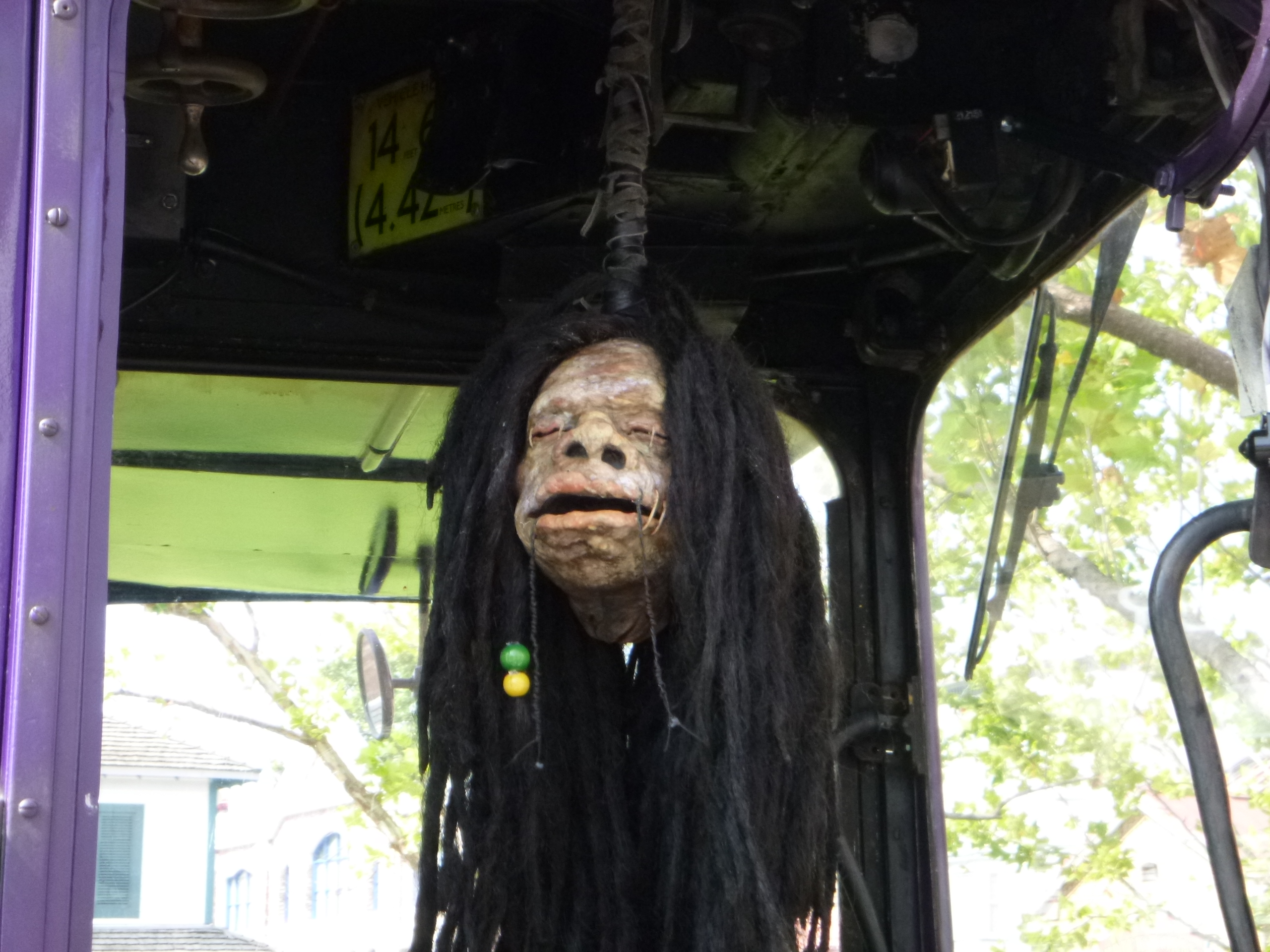
Shrunken head in the Knight Bus, The Wizarding World of Harry Potter

Tsantsas figure in Guatemalan author Augusto Monterroso's short story "Mister Taylor," in which an American entrepreneur starts an export business, selling the heads and causing societal upheaval as the society in the unnamed country tries to fill the growing demand. Mister Taylor's own head is the last one his office back home receives.

In the novel Moby-Dick, the character Queequeg sells shrunken heads and gives his last as a gift to the narrator, Ishmael, who subsequently sells it himself.

In the 1949 children's novel Amazon Adventure by Willard Price, the character John Hunt buys a shrunken head for the American Museum of Natural History from a Jivaro chief, who explains the shrinking process. The scene mirrors Price's own experience with the Jivaro, described in his 1948 travel book Roving South.

In 1955, Disneyland opened its Jungle Cruise ride. Until 2021, the attraction featured a trader selling shrunken heads (three of his for one of yours).

In 1975, Whiting (a Milton Bradley company) released Vincent Price's Shrunken Head Apple Sculpture Kit.

In the 1946 movie The Devil's Mask, a crashed plane with a shrunken head aboard is the only clue to a mystery involving a secret code.

In the 1979 movie Wise Blood, a shrunken head from Mercer University is stolen from a museum and used as a "new Jesus" that "don't look like any other man so you'll look at it."

The 1984 movie Indiana Jones and the Temple of Doom features shrunken heads as Thuggee adornment, notably on Mola Ram's headwear.

The 1988 movie Beetlejuice features a ghost of a hunter whose head had been shrunken. At the end of the movie, the title character suffers the same fate. The film's 2024 sequel, Beetlejuice Beetlejuice, features the return of the hunter with the shrunken head, named Bob, alongside many other ghosts with shrunken heads now employed at Betelgeuse's personal call centre.

One of the North American television commercials for the 1990 video game Dr. Mario featured head shrinking, as well as a cover of the song "Witch Doctor" with slightly different lyrics.

The Goosebumps book, How I Got My Shrunken Head, released in 1996, is about a boy who gets a shrunken head from his aunt that gives him jungle powers.

In the 2004 film adaptation of Harry Potter and the Prisoner of Azkaban, Lenny Henry voices Dre Head, a Jamaican-accented shrunken head on the magical Knight Bus. The same film features three more shrunken heads, voiced by Brian Bowles and Peter Serafinowicz, inside the wizard pub The Three Broomsticks.

Both Pirates of the Caribbean: Dead Man's Chest (2006) and Pirates of the Caribbean: At World's End (2007) feature shrunken heads.

== See also ==
- Mokomokai, preserved Māori heads also used as trade goods
- Dullahan
- Headless Rider urban legend
- Cephalophore – a saint who is generally depicted carrying their severed head
- Chhinnamasta – a Hindu goddess holding her own severed head
- Beheading game – Motif of medieval romance
- Decapitation – Complete separation of the head from the body
- Headhunting – Practice of hunting a human and collecting the severed head after killing the victim
- Headless priest
