= Muladona =

Female mule with a human woman's head

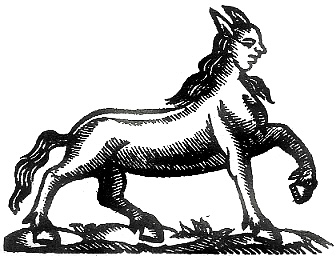
"Muladona" from an 18th-century text

In Catalan mythology, a Muladona or Donamula (mule-woman or woman-mule in Catalan) is a female mule with a human woman's head. Legend has it that a young woman was cursed by the townspeople for being irreverent and irreligious, and the curse turned her into a mule.

According to legend, she wandered mountains, especially at night, joining mule trains. It was claimed that mules were frightened by her presence enough to stampede into ravines and die.

The Muladona looks like a mule, but it is a mixture of human and animal, its mane is like a woman's hair and its face, while still appearing to be like that of an animal, is obviously human.

It is always represented with the four legs of a mule, but sometimes the front two legs join a thorax, located where a mule would have its neck. In addition, the animal is always represented with breasts to underline that it is female.

The muleteers used to give their mules small Muladona-shaped pieces of bread to eat, in the belief that this would stop the animals being frightened and allow them to ignore her if she appeared. In addition, they would repeatedly count the number of mules in the mule train in order to discover if the Muladona had become mixed in with their animals without them realizing, allowing them to avoid paying the price for the havoc she could sow.

== See also ==
- Sihuanaba
- Headless Mule
