= Death coach =

Mythical harbinger of death

The death coach is part of the folklore of Northwestern Europe. It is particularly strong in Ireland where it is known as the cóiste bodhar (Irish pronunciation: [ˈkoːʃtʲə ˈbˠəuɾˠ]), also meaning "silent coach", but can also be found in stories from British and American culture. It is usually depicted as a black coach being driven or led by a dullahan.

== Description ==
According to legend, the sight or sound of the coach is the harbinger of death. It warns of imminent death to either oneself or to a close relative. In Ireland in particular the death coach is seen as a signifier of the inevitability of death, as the belief goes once it has come to Earth it can never return empty. Thus, once the death of an individual has been decided by a greater power, mortals may do nothing to prevent it. The driver of the cóiste bodhar is said to be a headless horseman, called the Dullahan. The banshee is also associated with the coach, and is often depicted accompanying it.

In Scottish folklore, a death coach is said to be seen at times on the Royal Mile of Edinburgh, where it collects the souls of the dead. Also in Scotland a "hell wain" can supposedly be seen in the night sky.

== In popular culture ==
=== Film ===
The 1921 Swedish film The Phantom Carriage is based on the theme.

The cóiste bodhar was portrayed in the film Darby O'Gill and the Little People. It initially comes for the protagonist Darby's daughter Katie after being summoned by a banshee, but he makes a wish upon the leprechaun king to let it take him in her place. He's ultimately spared, however, when the leprechaun tricks him into voiding his wishes, and Darby is promptly ejected from the Cóiste Bodhar, which disappears into the night sky.

=== Television ===
The cóiste bodhar also appeared in Strange along with the banshee who is able to summon the coach.

=== Books ===
The cóiste bodhar is mentioned by W. B. Yeats in his collection Folk tales of Ireland.

The cóiste bodhar has also been featured in the Japanese light novel series Durarara!!. It serves as the steed of the Dullahan Celty Sturluson and it can shapeshift into anything ranging from a headless horse to a motorcycle.

== See also ==
- Folklore
- Superstition
- Grim Reaper
