= Chopper (propeller) =

Propeller design used on boats

A chopper is a propeller design largely of interest for production outboards on fast pad v-bottom boats. Unlike a cleaver the chopper's trailing edge extends aft with a large chord line at each radius. Choppers provide good acceleration and top speed and generally have relatively high rake, which has the effect of increasing the boat's angle of attack without changing the motor trim. This trimming effect is mistakenly called 'bow lift'.
