= Chopper (ghost) =

Hoax ghost in Neutraubling, Germany

The Chopper case ranks among the best-known German poltergeist incident in the post-war history of Bavaria. It began in the spring of 1981 with mysterious telephone calls to the dental practice of Kurt Bachseitz in the small town of Neutraubling near Regensburg, and by the spring of 1982 had grown into a months-long media spectacle that attracted attention nationwide and abroad.

After extensive technical investigations by the German Federal Post Office, as well as initial police inquiries into the calls, had failed to produce a conclusive result, the case took a new turn: the mysterious voice, now calling itself "Chopper/Tschopperl," no longer confined itself to the telephone but now also seemed to make itself heard freely in the room – whereupon the media began to take notice of the case. At this stage, the Freiburg parapsychologist Hans Bender became involved at the request of the criminal police and the media; he was director of the Freiburg Institute for Border Areas of Psychology and Mental Hygiene (IGPP), funded by the German Research Foundation (DFG). This development, in a sense, lent the case a certain scholarly cachet and drew still greater attention to it.

In March 1982 the public prosecutor's office and the police declared the case solved: on the basis of partial confessions by those involved – confessions that were, however, riddled with numerous contradictions and inconsistencies – the investigators stated that the entire affair had been a hoax staged in its entirety by Bachseitz, his wife, and the dental assistant Claudia Judenmann. What remained unresolved, however, was the point at which the deception had actually begun, and whether the mysterious calls dating back to 1981 had already formed part of the staged affair. All three of those involved were ultimately sentenced to substantial fines.

== The telephone terror (1981) ==
The reconstruction of events up to the public prosecutor's press conference on 4 March 1982 relies essentially on the statements of the principal participants – or rather, the principal perpetrators – and must therefore be treated with a certain degree of reservation: in the spring of 1981, a series of anonymous calls began at the dental practice of Kurt Bachseitz, directed at the dental assistant employed there, the then sixteen-year-old Claudia Judenmann. The caller identified himself as "Peter," claimed to be in love with Claudia, and harassed her with suggestive remarks, ambiguous promises, and coarse jokes. After the German Federal Post Office, at the dentist's request, installed a trap-and-trace line in April 1981 in order to track down the culprit, the telephone harassment assumed a new form – and it is presumably here that the true birth of "Chopper" is to be sought: the anonymous calls ceased, but in their place a voice now began breaking into ongoing phonecalls between Bachseitz and his patients – as often as 120 times a day – behaving in an increasingly malicious, vulgar, and obscene manner.

Despite replacing lines and equipment, the Post Office's technicians were unable to determine the cause of the phenomenon. The technicians were, admittedly, aware that it was possible to break into ongoing telephone calls from within the house by means of an extension telephone; at this point, however, no one yet considered this to be the source of the haunting. It was not until November 1981, after a death threat had been made against Claudia – purportedly from a certain "Oliver," ostensibly a friend of the already familiar "Peter" – that the police became involved. In view of a recent murder case in the vicinity, they took the threat and the preceding incidents extremely seriously. Yet neither extensive wiretapping measures nor the search of fifty-five apartments in the surrounding neighbourhood brought the investigators any closer to a lead.

== The media escalation (February 1982) ==
In the spring of 1982 the case took yet another turn: the voice was now audible not only over the telephone but also freely in the room – and it was only from this point onward that the voice began calling itself "Chopper." Journalistic interest was aroused by the failure of the Post Office and the police. An exclusive report in the local periodical Die Woche on 11 February 1982 unleashed a nationwide media avalanche: reporters crowded around the dental practice, individual journalists had themselves lodged in the house for a full fortnight in exchange for payment, and exclusive contracts were concluded with those involved. The tabloid press, foremost among them the Bild-Zeitung, turned the case into a veritable serial drama spanning several weeks: a film producer offered Claudia a role, a tabloid paper put up a reward of DM 5,000 for unmasking "Chopper," a specially composed "Chopper Song" was played on Bayern 3, SWF 3, and NDR, and Claudia, owing to the allure of her newfound celebrity, received numerous marriage proposals. Even in Japan and Australia the West German haunting attracted attention.

== The investigation of the case by Hans Bender and the first confessions ==
In mid-February 1982 the parapsychologist Hans Bender – director of the Freiburg Institute for Border Areas of Psychology and Mental Hygiene (IGPP), which he himself had founded and which was funded by the German Research Foundation (DFG); until 1975 holder of the university chair for border areas of psychology there; and, since 1980, once again entitled to bear the title of Doctor of Medicine following dubious circumstances – was alerted to the case through inquiries from the criminal police, Bavarian Broadcasting (BR), and a Munich-based scientist.

Detained by professional obligations, he did not travel to Neutraubling until 21 February; until then he was kept informed chiefly by the well-connected journalists Peter Ehm (Abendzeitung) and Eberhard Fuchs (Die Aktuelle), who at the same time served him as "door-openers." Bachseitz had initially refused any contact, and Claudia's father had forbidden her to speak with anyone. By the time Bender arrived, a media presence bordering on a siege already prevailed at the scene. Bender was quick to assume the involvement of supernatural forces. On 24 February a reporter from Der Spiegel likewise took part in a conversation with the Bachseitz couple and Claudia. That same day, the "Soko Geist" – a special task force of the criminal police formed shortly before, supported by specialists from Special Group 16 of the Munich Police Administration Office – arrived on the scene and initiated the first investigations, which soon led to the first partial confessions.

== Resolution and legal aftermath ==
On 3 March 1982, the Bachseitzes, together with Claudia, were summoned for questioning by senior public prosecutor Elmar Fischer; Claudia and the Bachseitz couple made partial confessions, admitting to having staged the ghostly voices. Already on the following day Fischer publicly announced the solution of the case at a press conference before more than 100 journalists, describing the whole affair as "an outright mess" ("ausgemachte Viecherei"), speaking of "several Choppers," and demonstrating – not without a certain absurdity, and none too convincingly – techniques of voice disguise. In the days that followed, differing and at times contradictory accounts of the perpetrators circulated in the press. Bachseitz later retracted his confession and to the very end maintained his innocence, insisting that any disguising of his voice, if it had occurred at all, had been unconscious. Despite numerous contradictions in the statements, all three were ultimately convicted. Following the unmasking, further "Chopper" calls from copycat offenders were received at various locations.

The public prosecutor's office had no interest in clarifying the case down to its last detail. Thus it ultimately remained unresolved whether the harassing telephone calls of 1981 had already been staged, wholly or in part, by the accused – or whether persons from outside the practice had in fact been involved at the outset. The suspicion that Mrs. Bachseitz, out of jealousy toward the young Claudia, had herself initially placed the calls to the practice in a disguised voice, or that, once the "Peter" calls had ceased, she had taken over the now-vacant role of troublemaker on a whim and thereby set the whole affair in motion, was neither substantiated nor disproved.

In the end, the whole affair proved a costly one for the so-called "ghost trio," as the media had dubbed them – Claudia and the Bachseitz couple. Despite contradictory statements, partial confessions, and later retractions, all were sentenced to substantial fines. Claudia lost her job and her circle of friends, nothing more was heard of the film role that had been offered to her, and she eventually left her hometown and assumed a new identity. In addition to the fine, she bore roughly DM 12,000 in court and police costs. She later married into comfortable middle-class circumstances. Bachseitz, no longer able to withstand the public pressure, gave up his practice, moved away, and, together with his wife, entered psychiatric treatment. The Federal Post Office sought damages from him in the amount of DM 60,000 (later the figure of DM 35,000 was mentioned) – whether he actually had to pay remains uncertain, since the court did not hold him responsible for the initial phase, placing the blame solely on Claudia.

The case left its mark beyond this immediate circle as well: Hans Bender ultimately distanced himself publicly from a parapsychological interpretation – a remarkable reversal of his earlier position. Other parapsychologists, foremost among them Bender's assistant Elmar R. Gruber, were likewise ridiculed, as were the investigating authorities: Claudia's lawyer Ernst Bäumel declared that he had "never experienced such an investigative effort, not even in a case of quadruple murder." In the end, the only party to profit was the press, which relished inflating the entire haunting into a "serial" story revolving around "Chopper" and staged from it a spectacle of the first order – to the amusement of the public, and to its own advantage in boosting circulation.

== Bibliography ==
- Gert Geisler, "Ohne eine Spur von Geist," Esotera 33/4 (1982), pp. 336–344 [published anonymously].
- Elmar R. Gruber, Suche im Grenzenlosen. Hans Bender – ein Leben für die Parapsychologie, Cologne, 1993.
- Gerhard Meyer, "Über Grenzen Schreiben. Presseberichterstattung zu Themen aus dem Bereich der Anomalistik und der Grenzgebiete der Psychologie in den Printmedien Spiegel, Bild und Bild am Sonntag," Zeitschrift für Anomalistik 3 (2003), pp. 8–46.
- Gerhard Mayer, Phantome – Wunder – Sensationen. Das Übersinnliche in der Presseberichterstattung (= Schriftenreihe der Gesellschaft für Anomalistik, vol. 3), Sandhausen, 2004.
- Gerhard Mayer, Michael Schetsche, 'N gleich 1.' Methodologie und Methodik anomalistischer Einzelfallstudien (= Perspektiven der Anomalistik – Schriftenreihe der Gesellschaft für Anomalistik, vol. 4), Sandhausen, 2011.
- Gerhard Mayer, "The Authority Strikes Back: Considerations About the Allegedly Fraudulent 'Chopper' Poltergeist Case." In idem (ed.): 'N Equals 1.' Single Case Studies in Anomalistics (= Perspektiven der Anomalistik – Schriftenreihe der Gesellschaft für Anomalistik, vol. 6), Muenster, 2019, pp. 261–275 ["parapsychological" study; the author draws, among other sources, on Bender's archival material, while nevertheless arguing that a paranormal phenomenon may have underlain the case in its initial stages].
