= Chopper (video game) =

2009 video game

- Developer: Majic Jungle Software
- Platforms: iOS, MacOS
- Release: April 5, 2009
- Genre: Scrolling shooter

Chopper is an iOS and MacOS video game developed by New Zealand studio Majic Jungle Software and released on April 5, 2009. As of February 2, 2018, the app is removed from the iOS and Mac App Store. Chopper is a side scrolling shooter game with your character, a helicopter (a.k.a. a chopper). Your goal is to destroy tanks, take out enemy soldiers, and rescue civilians.

A sequel, Chopper 2, was released on July 27, 2010.

== Gameplay ==
The main goal in chopper is to destroy tanks, kill enemies, and rescue civilians, while trying not to crash into buildings or get shot down by several kinds of enemies.

== Characters and enemies ==
Your chopper:

Equipped with a machine gun and heavy explosives, your chopper is capable of clearing out enemy forces while airlifting stranded civilians to safety across every level.

Civilians: People that have a blue circle around them. Your goal is to rescue them and return them to base safely.

The enemies: The common soldier. A red circle is around them. They are armed with a rocket launcher and can take out your chopper with one hit. Tanks, a more harder enemy. Tanks can shoot relatively fast and can quickly dispatch your chopper in one hit.

== Reception ==
Chopper had generally positive reviews.

Chopper was a great success, with further growth in sales after the release of its sequel, Chopper 2. As the years went on, "More and more things have stopped working correctly, so I no longer feel the experience offered to customers is one that I am proud of. I investigated what it would take to bring Chopper 2 up to date, and it would be a major job. Given the potential number of sales and number of current players, my time is better spent elsewhere. I’ve moved on from Chopper and Chopper 2, and so has the landscape of the App Store." and so the developer, David Frampton, decided to pull both Chopper and Chopper 2 off the App Store and Mac App Store.

== Chopper 2 ==
Chopper 2
- Developer: Majic Jungle Software
- Platforms: iOS, MacOS
- Release: July 27, 2010
- Genre: Scrolling shooter

A game similar to the original Chopper, Chopper 2 had many improvements over its predecessor. Improved graphics, new missions, improved UI, and the ability to connect to other Apple devices, such as the iPad and Macintosh, with another copy of the game, to allow for remote control. The game "is a total evolution from the first episode: better graphics, more missions, more variety". The improvements over the original really helped with the game's success, as it sold very well and generally had good reviews.

=== Gameplay ===
Chopper 2 has the same basic, shoot, destroy, and rescue aspects of the original Chopper. You go about in the city, desert, foothills, and mountains flying your way to save civilians, destroy tanks, blow up buildings, shoot down helicopters, and eliminate enemy soldiers while trying to keep your chopper in the sky. In some levels, your goal is to keep a friendly convoy of vehicles reach their destination without getting destroyed.

=== Reception ===
Chopper 2 received reviews from publications including Pocket Gamer and Gamereactor, along with having a Metacritic rating of 86% based on 6 critic reviews.

Chopper 2 was removed from the iOS and Mac App Store, along with the original Chopper on July 4, 2016. As of October 24, 2019, it was added back to the App Store under the iOS and Android gaming subscription service, GameClub.
