= Chopper (comics) =

Horror comic book mini-series

- Cover of Chopper #1

Publication information
- Publisher: Asylum Press
- Schedule: Bi-monthly
- Format: Miniseries
- Genre: Horror
- Publication date: October 2011 – February 2012
- No. of issues: 3

Creative team
- Created by: Martin Shapiro
- Written by: Martin Shapiro
- Artist(s): Juan Ferreyra; Cliff Richards
- Colorist: Chandran Ponnusamy

Chopper is a horror comic book miniseries written by Martin Shapiro, illustrated by Juan Ferreyra (who was later replaced by Cliff Richards from issue #3 onward), and published by Asylum Press in 2011.

The series is a modern-day reimagining of the Headless Horseman from Washington Irving's 1820 short story "The Legend of Sleepy Hollow" that takes place in Daytona Beach, Florida during Bike Week.

== Plot ==
In the story, a police officer's rebellious teenage daughter takes a strange new ecstasy-like drug at a party that causes her to see ghosts – and one of them is a headless Hell's Angel on a motorcycle who collects the souls of sinners in the afterlife and he wants her tainted soul.

== Adaptations ==
=== Web series ===
As part of an ambitious transmedia launch strategy, a prequel to the main Chopper storyline was produced as a web TV series starring actors Tyler Mane (Halloween, X-Men) and Andrew Bryniarski (The Texas Chainsaw Massacre, Batman Returns).

=== Films ===
A film adaptation of the comic book is in the works. The screenplay was written by Martin Shapiro.
