= Dullahan =

Type of mythogical creature in Irish mythology

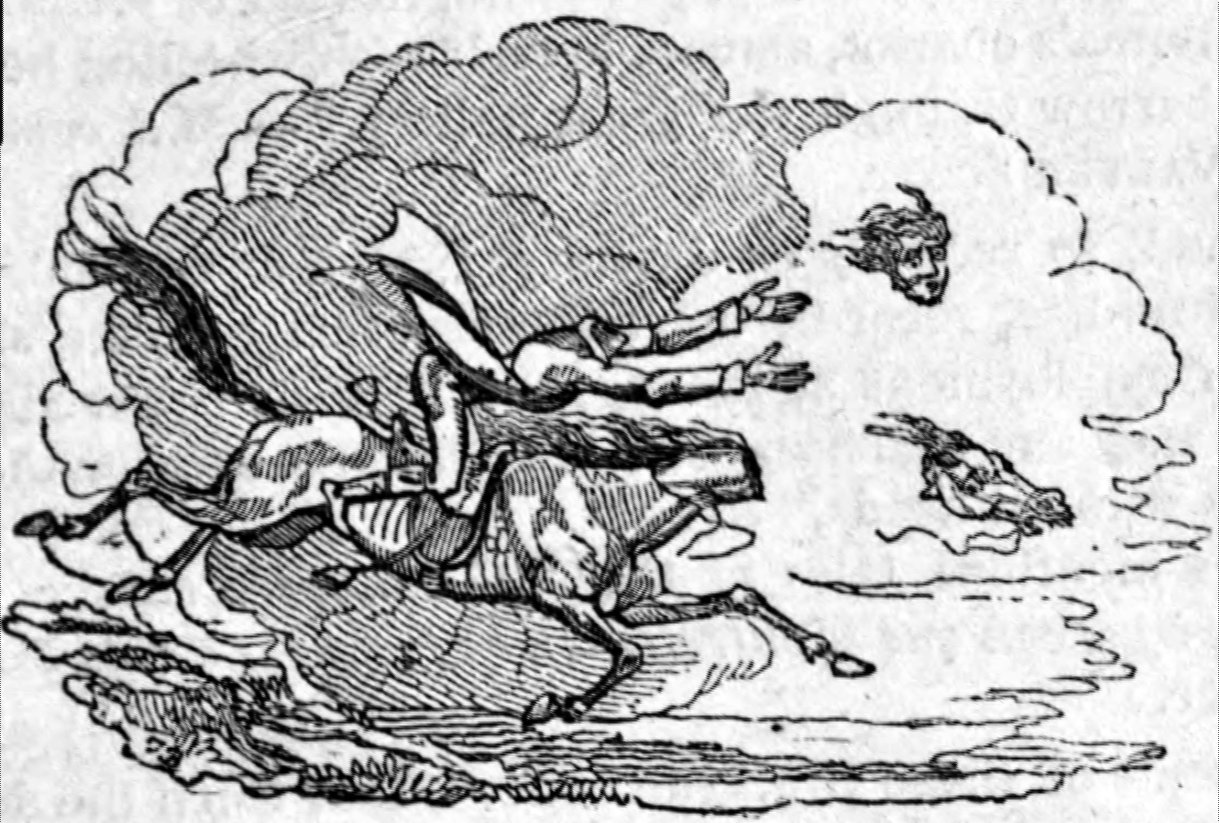
Dullahan, the headless horseman —Illustrated by W. H. Brooke, Croker, Fairy Legends (3rd ed., 1834).

The Dullahan (Irish: Dubhlachan; dúlachán, /ˈduːləˌhɑːn/) is a type of legendary creature in Irish folklore. He is depicted as a headless rider on a black horse, or as a coachman, who carries his own head.

As it is not widely attested in native sources, including no references to it on the Irish Folklore Commission's website, there is doubt as to whether the Dullahan was originally a part of the Irish oral tradition.

== Etymology ==
Dullahan or Dulachan (Irish: Dubhlachan [Duḃlaċan]) referring to "hobgoblin" (generic term; cf. Dullahan described as "unseelie (wicked) fairy"), literally "signifies dark, sullen person", according to the lexicographer Edward O'Reilly. (Note: Edward O'Reilly (by private communication) cited by Croker.) Dulachan and Durrachan are alternative words for this "hobgoblin", and these forms suggest etymological descent from dorr/durr "anger" or durrach "malicious" or "fierce". The original Irish term contains the stem dubh, meaning "black" in Irish.

Dullahan was later glossed as "dark, angry, sullen, fierce or malicious being", (Note: O'Hanlon's book drew from Croker. See Frank Kinahan's remark (though it concerns the appropriation material regarding the merrow).) (Note: O'Hanlon (1893), also quoted by Josianne Leah Campbell (2016).) encompassing both etymologies, though Thomas Crofton Croker considered the alternative etymology more dubious than the dubh "black" ("dark") etymology. (Note: Croker felt that the "this etymology [by O'Reilly] may be questioned, as dubh "black" is a "component of the word".)

The Dullahan is also called Colainn Gan Cheann, meaning "without a head" in Irish.

"Headless Coach" (Irish: Cóiste Gan Cheann) or the "Soundless Coach" (literally "deaf coach", Irish: cóiste bodhar; Hiberno-English: Coshta Bower, corrupted to "coach-a-bower") (Note: Haughton (2012), p. 63, historian, cited by Josianne Leah Campbell (2016).) is the name given to the vehicle driven by the Dullahan.

== Folk beliefs ==
=== Description ===
He is depicted as a headless horseman, typically on a black horse, (Note: Haughton (2012), p. 54 generalizes on colour of the horseman's steed. Whereas Croker's story "Hanlon's Mill" features a "black coach drawn by six black horses". Croker's annotation also quotes an account of a "spirit.. in the shape of a black horse without a head", from The Spectator, but this was actually a fabricated ghost story by Joseph Addison, set near the (English) manor of the fictitious Sir Roger de Coverley.) who may carry his own head in his hand or under his arm. The severed head has a revolting appearance, as in Croker's tale "The Headless Horseman":

...such a head no mortal ever saw before. It looked like a large cream cheese hung round with black puddings: no speck of colour enlivened the ashy paleness of the depressed features; the skin lay stretched over the unearthly surface almost like the parchment head of a drum. Two fiery eyes of prodigious circumference, with a strange and irregular motion, flashed like meteors.

According to the modern storyteller Tony Locke of County Mayo, the Dullahan's mouth, full of razor-sharp teeth, forms a grin reaching the sides of the head, its "massive" eyes "constantly dart about like flies", and the flesh has acquired the "smell, colour and consistency of mouldy cheese".

There are also legends and tales mentioning the "Headless Coach" (also called "Coach-a-bower"; Irish: cóiste bodhar), with the Dullahan as its presumed driver. (Note: Croker's section on The Dullahan includes the tale "Hanlon's Mill", and in the postscript Croker states the "Headless Coach" is a "general superstition".) (Note: O'Hanlon's poem "Legend of Murrisk" describes the Coach-a-bower on the move, and its driver is explicitly called "Dullahan" in a subsequent stanza.) Cóiste Bodhar was referred to as "Soundless Coach" by Robert Lynd, who gave an account of a "silent shadow" of a coach passing by, provided by an avowed witness from Connemara. However, William Butler Yeats explained that "the 'deaf coach' was so called because of its rumbling sound". (Note: Cf. Charles Welsh, who repeats the blood basin splashing told by Croker, adds that the coach "rumbles to your door".) According to one witness, (Note: Lynd's informant was from Connemara, County Galway.) only the silent shadow of the horse-drawn hearse, i.e., the "Soundless Coach" was seen passing by.

In Croker's poem "The Death Coach", the carriage axle is made of a human spine and the wheel-spokes are constructed from thigh bones. A later writer prosifying this description supplied additional details, so that the "two hollow skulls" used as lanterns on the carriage are set with candles, and the hammercloth made of pall material "mildew'd by damps" is embellished as being chewed away by worms. (Note: And the upholstery covering the wagon becomes "dried human skin", for example, in Jim Zub's comic novel Wayward 4 (2017).)

=== Behaviour ===
A Dullahan appears as a mounted horseman or a coachman driving a horse-drawn carriage out of graveyards. The rumour of a Dullahan's appearance often develops near a graveyard or a charnel vault where a wicked aristocrat is reputed to be buried.

He arrives, driving the death coach, at the doorstep of a person whose death is approaching. According to Croker, the appearance of the "Headless Coach" foreshadows imminent death or misfortune. In "Hanlon's Mill", Michael (Mick) Noonan is returning from his trip to a shoemaker at Ballyduff, Co. Cork, and during his journey, he sees a black coach drawn by six headless black horses, driven by a headless coachman clad in black. The next morning, Mick receives news from the huntsman that Master Wrixon of Ballygibblin had a fit and died.

Croker reports that in one legend, a Headless Coach would run back and forth from Castle Hyde (Note: About 2 miles north-west of Fermoy.) to a glen/valley (Note: "Glana Fauna".) beyond the village of Ballyhooly, in County Cork. (Note: Fermoy is on the Blackwater, as is Killavullen, and Ballyhooly is about midpoint in between.) Nearby in the town of Doneraile, (Note: 4 miles west of Ballygibblin, 7 miles north-north-west of Killavullen (the Mill).) it was said that the coach would visit the houses in succession, and whichever occupant dared to open the door would be splashed with a basin of blood by the coachman.

There are rumours that golden objects can force the Dullahan to disappear.

=== Sight ===
A modern commentator stated that the Dullahan has the ability to see with the severed head and can "use it to scan the countryside for mortals about to die".

In contrast, the headless coach in the tale "The Harvest Dinner" is described as a "blind (thief)", and Croker assumed he lacks sight.

=== Whip ===
The Dullahan allegedly uses a human spine as a whip according to a number of 21st century commentators. (Note: Brian Ray's essay claims that "W. B. Yeats mentions.. the dullahan.. brandishing a whip made from a human spine", however, the source Ray cites, Yeats (2003), p. 118 (= Yeats (1888), p. 108 fails to mention whip or spine.) (Note: Dullahan using human spine as whip occurs in fantasy fiction writer Craig Shaw Gardner's novelization Leprechauns (1999).)

The headless coachman merely bears a "long whip" in Croker's tale "The Harvest Dinner", with which he lashes the horses so furiously, he almost strikes a witness blind in an eye (the would-be-victim regarded it as deliberate assault). Croker deduced that the headless creature, as a way of habit, attempts to destroy his witness's eye or eyes with his whip, reasoning that the coachman's wrath turns to the onlooker because he lacks the ability to look due to his headlessness. (Note: The coachman is called a "blind thief" in the tale, which corroborates the notion he cannot see.)

== Folk tales ==
Croker's Fairy Legends and Traditions of the South of Ireland (1828) contained a section on "The Dullahan" devoted to the lore of headless beings.

The tale "The Good Woman" recounts a peasant's encounter with a cloaked female who turns out to be a Dullahan. A peasant named Larry Dodd, a resident of "White Knight's Country" at the foot the Galtee Mountains (Galtymore), (Note: The Mountains span from County Limerick to County Tipperary, but the White Knight's estate here was probably to the south, in County Cork. In 1643, the then White Knight (prob. John Fitzgibbon, 9th White Knight) lived at Kilbehenny Castle in the southern shadow of Galtymore, John Oge Fitzgibbon, 10th White Knight was known by alias "John the White Knight of Mitchelstown, County Cork".") travels to Cashel where he buys a nag, intending to sell it at Kildorrery fair that June evening. He offers a ride to a cloaked female, and when he grabs her to exact a kiss as payment for the ride, he discovers her to be a Dullahan. After losing consciousness, in the church ruins he finds a wheel of torture set with severed heads (skulls) and headless Dullahans, both men and women and nobles and commoners of various occupations. Larry is offered a drink, and when he is about to compliment it, his head is severed mid-sentence. His head reverts when he regains his senses. He loses his horse to the Dullahans. (Note: The epilogue tells of Larry getting a tongue-lashing from his wife Nancy Gollagher after his absence the whole night. Larry wisecracks that the headless woman should be called a "Good Woman" (as given in the title) in comparison, for she lacks the ability to verbally abuse him so. It is further explained that a "Good Woman" referred to a saint or devoted woman martyred by decapitation, but this got corrupted to a standing joke that a woman without a head (and therefore can only remain silent) is therefore a "Good woman".)

== See also ==
- Cephalophore
- Crom Dubh
- Headless Rider urban legend
- The Legend of Sleepy Hollow

== See also ==
- Headless Rider urban legend
- Cephalophore – a saint who is generally depicted carrying their severed head
- Chhinnamasta – a Hindu goddess holding her own severed head
- Beheading game – Motif of medieval romance
- Decapitation – Complete separation of the head from the body
- Headhunting – Practice of hunting a human and collecting the severed head after killing the victim
- Shrunken head
- Decapitation in Islam
- With Her Head Tucked Underneath Her Arm
- Saints Gemolo and Himerius of Bosto
- Headless Horseman
- Headless priest
- Headless men
- List of ghosts
