= Martin Shapiro =

American screenwriter (born 1967)

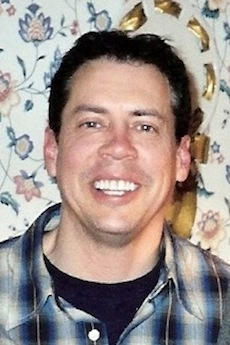
- Martin Shapiro
- Born: June 8, 1967 (age 59) Richmond, Virginia, United States
- Area: Writer
- Notable works: Chopper; Skinwalker

Martin Shapiro is an American screenwriter and comic book writer. He created the horror comic book series Chopper published by Asylum Press and wrote the screenplay for the movie version of it.

== Early life ==
Shapiro was born at a United States Army base in Frankfurt, Germany where his father was stationed. He was raised in Richmond, Virginia. After high school, he served for eight years in the U.S. Air Force. In 1990, he attended Embry-Riddle Aeronautical University, with the intention of becoming an Air Force pilot upon graduation.

In 1991, Shapiro was recalled to active duty for the Gulf War. While still deployed in Kuwait, he decided to change gears in life and applied to the University of Central Florida Film School. Shortly after returning to Patrick AFB, Florida, he was accepted into UCF's motion picture program, where he developed a passion for writing, directing and producing films alongside classmates Eduardo Sanchez and Daniel Myrick, who went on to co-direct The Blair Witch Project several years later.

== Career ==
=== Film ===
Shapiro’s first feature-length screenplay Lair of the Fox, a military action-thriller, was optioned by Ilya Salkind (Producer of Superman). Shapiro went on to write and develop projects for MGM, HBO and other production companies including an adaptation of Dragonlance, the New York Times bestselling series of fantasy novels with sales of 22 million copies worldwide, and the role-playing game Millennium’s End.

While writing professionally in Los Angeles, Shapiro attended the UCLA School of Theater, Film and Television, where he received his Master of Fine Arts degree in Screenwriting. While in the program, he won the prestigious UCLA Showcase award for his war drama Crossfire.

=== Comic books ===
In 2011, Shapiro launched Chopper, a creator-owned comic book series published by Asylum Press. The movie rights to the book were optioned in the same year and Shapiro wrote the screenplay adaptation.

=== Web series ===
A prequel based on characters from the comic book was produced as a web series starring actors Tyler Mane (Halloween, X-Men) and Andrew Bryniarski (The Texas Chainsaw Massacre, Batman Returns).

== Bibliography ==
- Chopper (Asylum Press)
- Skinwalker (Asylum Press)
