= Headless Rider urban legend =

Japanese Urban Legend

Headless Rider (首なしライダー Kubinashi Rider) is a Japanese urban legend of a motorbike rider with a missing head.

== Legend ==
A piano wire is stretched across a road at neck height, causing a motorcyclist to become decapitated as a result of running into it at high speed. However, the bike remained upright and continued traveling for some time with the headless rider still on board. The rider becomes a ghost and continues to ride down the same road every night (or at the time/anniversary of the death). The decapitation is sometimes attributed to falling objects from road signs, guardrails, or trucks. The reason for the appearance is often stated to be that the rider is still searching for the murderer or his missing head.

There is also an urban legend of a 'headless biker gang', in which a group of headless riders explode on the mountain roads of Mount Hiko in Fukuoka Prefecture. There is also a variation in which severed heads are said to fly in, mostly with cries of despair, in a different location to where the motorbikes appear. It is not clear whether or not they are accompanied by helmets in this case.

== Origin ==
Rumors of headless riders only really took off after the release of the film Stone (1974) in Australia (released in Japan in 1981). The film contained a scene in which a rider's head is chopped off by a wire stretched across a road, and this is said to have spread in connection with rumors of motorcycle accidents in various parts of the country.

The urban legend is said to have originated from an actual accident in which a person annoyed by a biker gang used a rope stretched across a road as an obstruction, causing the rider(s) to crash. There are various theories about the original accident, but some say that it was actually just an accidental fatal motorbike accident there that was passed on in an amusing manner.

Some believe that it originated when a motorcyclist wearing a dark colored, full-face helmet on a dark road was mistakenly identified as a headless rider. In fact, some riders wearing dark colored helmets have mentioned being mistakenly reported as a headless riders. There are also reportedly some fun-loving riders who deliberately wear black, full-face helmets (which have been treated to reduce light reflections) at night in order to achieve this effect. Others say that witnesses may have also mistaken a person on a supersport type motorcycle, which positions the rider in a leaning-forward prone position on top of the fuel tank, as being a headless rider.

== See also ==
- Dullahan
- The Legend of Sleepy Hollow
- Cephalophore
- Durarara!!, a Japanese light novel series with a headless motorcycle rider as a major character
