= Headless priest =

Central American legend

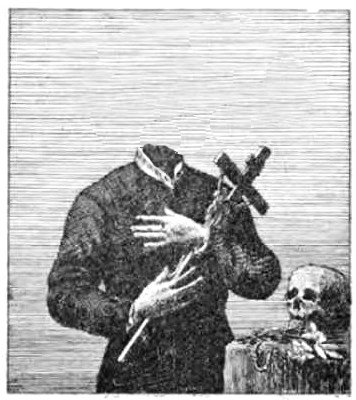
- A modern depiction of the headless priest

Creature information
- Grouping: Ghost
- Similar entities: La Llorona, La Segua

Origin
- Region: Central America

In Central American mythology and folklore, the headless priest (Spanish: el padre sin cabeza, lit. 'the headless father' or el cura sin cabeza, lit. 'the headless priest') is the spirit of a Catholic priest who died by beheading. There are multiple competing legends about the ghost that vary by region.

== Context ==
The headless priest is one of several traditional Central American and Philippine legends about spirits that attack travelers at night. These stories typically serve to teach moral lessons. For example, La Llorona warns mothers against infanticide, while La Segua discourages men from infidelity. Similarly, the headless priest legend serves as a warning against those that would profane against the holy, or "touch God with dirty hands (Spanish: tocan a Dios con las manos sucias)".

According to The Tico Times, the legend of the headless priest has its origin in Catholic guilt. The ghost's appearance as a priest is allegedly representative of a cultural fear of the clerical abuse of authority. The legend may have originated from the period of the Spanish colonization of the Americas, during which some Catholic missionaries were beheaded by indigenous leaders.

== Mythology ==
Costa Rica has several regional variations of the myth. In San Ramón, Alajuela Province, the legend goes that in 1845, a priest named Father Luis Francisco Pérez won 40,000 gold coins while gambling. He then traveled to Nicaragua, and entrusted his gold to his brother. Father Pérez was decapitated while in Nicaragua, and when his brother heard of the news he buried the gold and died of grief. The legend holds that to this day, the headless spirit of the priest guards his gold from any who seek to find it. Some versions of this myth exclude the brother, and say instead that the priest buried the gold himself and lied about traveling to Nicaragua. In Patarrá, San José Province, the myth tells that the headless priest hides near a church in order to attack and scare sinners into changing their ways. This version of the ghost is distinct because the priest is alleged to have attacked a man who entered the church while drunk. In some variations of the myth, the priest is killed by God on the steps of the altar while consecrating the host.

In El Salvador, the headless priest is said to either have died before he could make final confession, or to have died in a revolt alongside peasants. This version of the myth holds that he enters churches every Friday night in search of his missing head. In Guatemala, legend says that a headless priest haunts abandoned churches, and may be seen by traveling arrieros at night. Nicaraguan myths hold the priest's spirit responsible as the cause of historical earthquakes and floods in León Viejo, a city founded in the 16th century.

== See also ==
- List of ghosts
