= Saint-Just =

Saint-Just, Saint-Juste, St-Juste, or St Just may refer to:

== Music ==
- Saint Just (album)
- Saint Just (band), an Italian progressive rock band

== Places ==
=== France ===
- Saint-Just (Lyon), a section of the city of Lyon
- Saint-Just, Ain, in the Ain département
- Saint-Just, Ardèche, in the Ardèche département
- Saint-Just, Cantal, in the Cantal département
- Saint-Just, Cher, in the Cher département
- Saint-Just, Dordogne, in the Dordogne département
- Saint-Just, Eure, in the Eure département
- Saint-Just, Hérault, in the Hérault département
- Saint-Just, Ille-et-Vilaine, in the Ille-et-Vilaine département
- Saint-Just, Puy-de-Dôme, in the Puy-de-Dôme département
- Saint-Just-Chaleyssin, in the Isère département
- Saint-Just-d'Avray, in the Rhône département
- Saint-Just-de-Claix, in the Isère département
- Saint-Just-en-Bas, in the Loire département
- Saint-Just-en-Brie, in the Seine-et-Marne département
- Saint-Just-en-Chaussée, in the Oise département
- Saint-Just-en-Chevalet, in the Loire département
- Saint-Just-et-le-Bézu, in the Aude département
- Saint-Just-et-Vacquières, in the Gard département
- Saint-Just-Ibarre, in the Pyrénées-Atlantiques département
- Saint-Just-la-Pendue, in the Loire département
- Saint-Just-le-Martel, in the Haute-Vienne département
- Saint-Just-Luzac, in the Charente-Maritime département
- Saint-Just-Malmont, in the Haute-Loire département
- Saint-Just-près-Brioude, in the Haute-Loire département
- Saint-Just-Saint-Rambert, in the Loire département
- Saint-Just-Sauvage, in the Marne département
- Saint-Just-sur-Dive, in the Maine-et-Loire département
- Saint-Just-sur-Viaur, in the Aveyron département

=== Puerto Rico ===
- St. Just, Trujillo Alto, Puerto Rico, a barrio

=== UK ===
- St Just in Penwith, Cornwall
- St Just in Roseland, Cornwall

== People with the surname ==
- Benjamin St-Juste (born 1997), Canadian player of American football
- Emmanuel Marie Michel Philippe Fréteau de Saint-Just (1745–1794), twice president of the National Assembly
- Jason St Juste (born 1985), Kittitian footballer
- Jerry St. Juste (born 1996), Dutch footballer
- Laurore St. Juste, Haitian historian
- Louis Antoine de Saint-Just (1767–1794), a legislative, military and political leader during the French Revolution
- Mark Saint Juste (born 1968), American television and music producer
- Marguerite St. Just, a character in The Scarlet Pimpernel

== See also ==
- Justus (disambiguation)
