= Justus of Beauvais =

3rd-century saint of Roman Catholic Church

Saint Justus of Beauvais
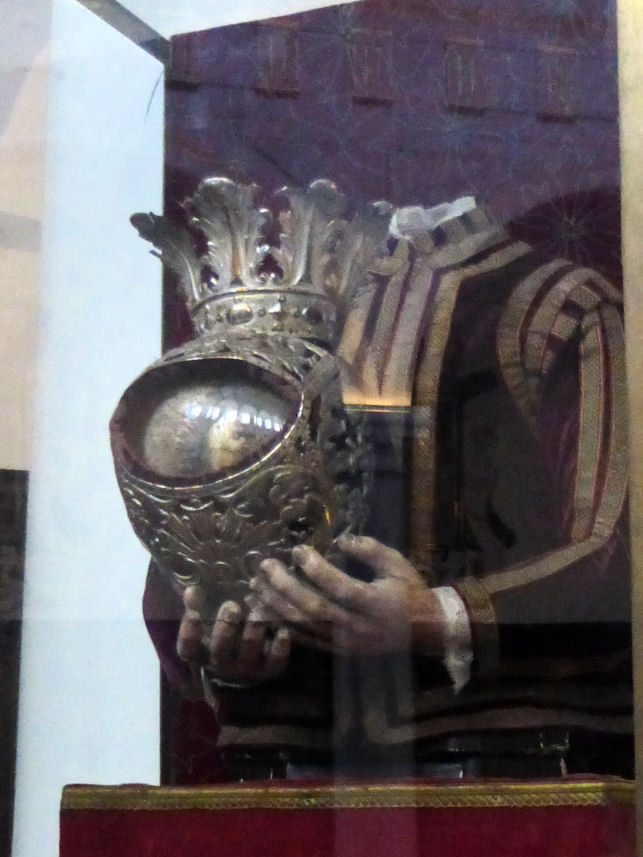
- Reliquary, Antwerp
- Born: c. 278; Auxerre
- Died: c. 287; Saint-Just-en-Chaussée
- Venerated in: Roman Catholic Church
- Major shrine: relics enshrined in the cathedral of Paris
- Feast: 18 October
- Attributes: palm of martyrdom; depicted as young boy

Justus of Beauvais (c. 278 – c. 287) is a semi-legendary saint of the Roman Catholic Church. He may have been a Gallo-Roman martyr, but his legend was confused with that of other saints, such as Justin of Paris.

== History ==
Tradition states that he was a child of nine who was denounced as a Christian while on a trip with his father to Amiens to ransom or rescue an imprisoned relative during the persecutions of Diocletian. He was executed for confessing that he was a Christian and for refusing to give away the hiding place of his father and uncle.

After he was beheaded, Justus' body then picked up the severed head and continued to speak. Justus is thus one of the legendary cephalophores, the saintly "head-carriers" who miraculously continued to speak or move despite being decapitated. This legend was elaborated in subsequent centuries and stated that the headless boy managed to convert pagan onlookers.

This miraculous act is said to have happened in a spot between Beauvais and Senlis now named after him: Saint-Just-en-Chaussée.

== Veneration ==
Veneration for Justus was widespread in France, Belgium, and Switzerland – where places named Saint-Just refer to him - and his cult spread to England as well.

Winchester claimed some of his relics from the 10th century. In England the Annales monasterii de Wintonia reports that in 924 Athelstan donated to the treasury of Winchester the head of this martyr. It is possible that this may not have been the entire head but just a fragment of it, according to one scholar.

In the first half of the 11th century, the diocese of Chur in Switzerland received his relics as well.

Additionally, the abbey of Malmedy in Belgium asserted that at the beginning of the 10th century, its monks had acquired - at a good price - the body of Justus. Saint-Riquier also claimed his body.

Zutphen in the Netherlands also claimed some of his relics since at least the 14th, but probably since the 11th century. Franciscans brought an additional relic, the skull of Justus, to Zutphen around 1450 when they established themselves there. A confraternity dedicated to Ewald and Justus was established in 1454. His feast is celebrated on October 11 there. The skull was rescued from the burning Franciscan monastery during the assault on Zutphen by Dutch Protestant rebels in June 1572. The relic was several years later taken by a priest to Antwerp and it is still there in the Carolus Borromeus church.
