= Nicasius of Rheims =

Bishop of Rheims

Saint Nicasius of Reims
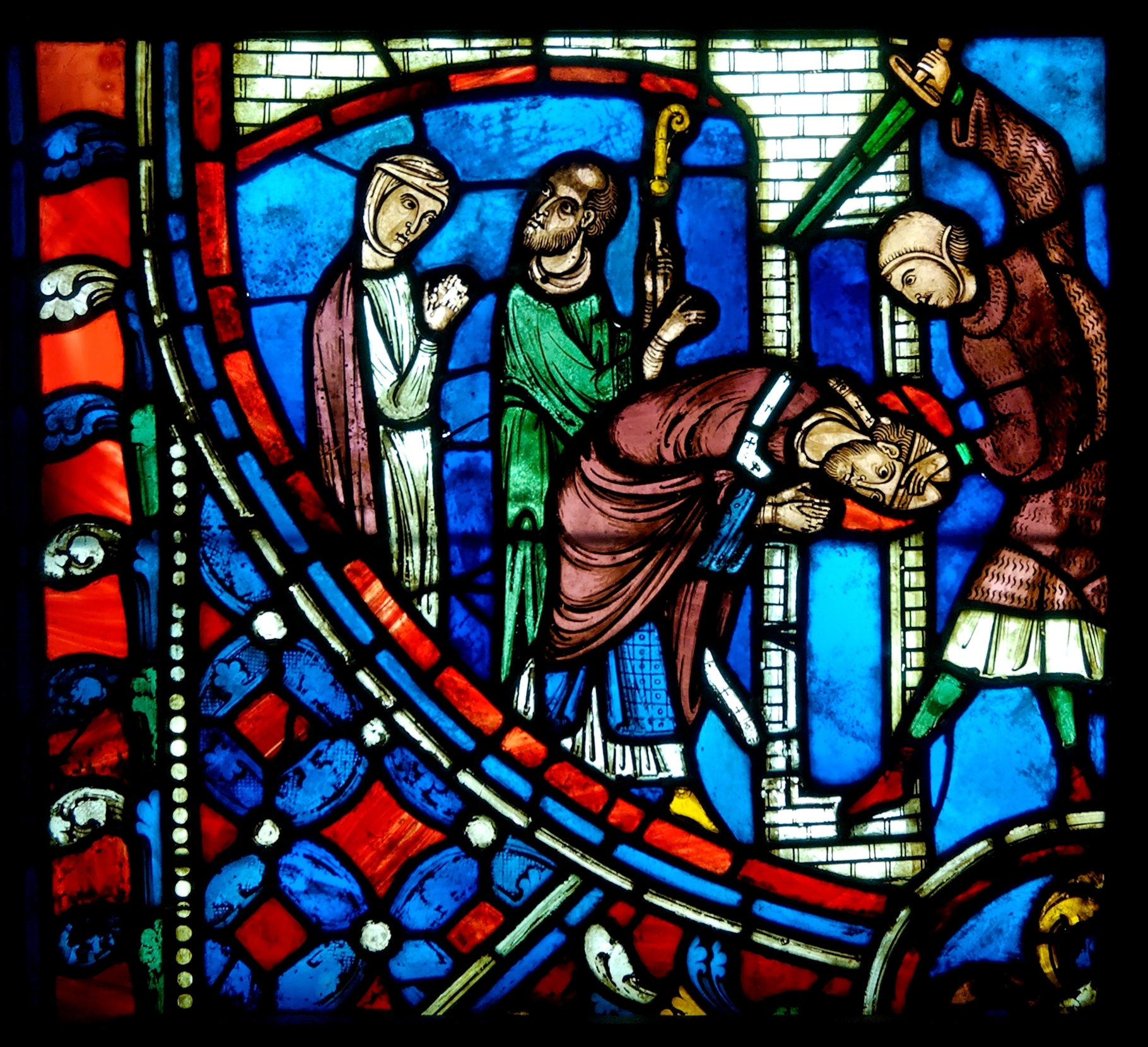
- Martyrdom of St. Nicasius: Scene from the life of St. Nicasius. Stained glass window from a chapel of Soissons Cathedral early 13th century.

Martyr, Bishop
- Died: ~407 AD
- Venerated in: Catholic Church; Eastern Orthodox Church
- Canonized: Pre-Congregation
- Major shrine: Reims Cathedral
- Feast: 14 December
- Patronage: smallpox

Saint Nicasius of Reims (French: Saint-Nicaise; d. 407 or 451) was a Bishop of Reims. He founded the first Reims Cathedral and is the patron saint of smallpox victims.

== Vandals ==
Sources placing his death in 407 credit him with prophesying the invasion of France by the Vandals. He notified his people of this vision, telling them to prepare. When asked if the people should fight or not, Nicasius responded, "Let us abide the mercy of God and pray for our enemies. I am ready to give myself for my people." Later, when the barbarians were at the gates of the city, he decided to attempt to slow them down so that more of his people could escape. He was killed by the Vandals either at the altar of his church or in its doorway. He was killed with Jucundus, his lector, Florentius, his deacon, and Eutropia, his virgin sister.

After the killing of Nicasius and his colleagues, the Vandals are said to have been frightened away from the area, according to some sources even leaving the treasure they had already gathered.

Accounts of his martyrdom credit him with being among the cephalophores ("head-carriers") like Saint Denis. Nicasius was said to have been reciting Psalm 119: he was then decapitated as he reached the verse Adhaesit pavimento anima mea ("My soul is attached unto dust") and then continued reciting Vivifica me Domine secundum verbum tuum ("Revive me, Lord, with your words") even after his head had fallen to the ground. He was sometimes depicted in art walking with the upper part of his head and its mitre in his hand.

== Huns ==
Sources placing his death in 451 record similar acts but concerning the Huns rather than the Vandals. These sources – but not those concerning the Vandals – further relate that Nicasius survived a bout of smallpox. This claim has been made more credible by research showing a long history of smallpox in Egypt, suggestions of its spread through the Roman Empire, and identification of 6th century outbreaks of the disease.

== Legacy ==
From his supposed survival of smallpox, Nicasius became the patron saint of smallpox victims. One prayer ran:

In the name of our Lord Jesus Christ, may the Lord protect these persons and may the work of these virgins ward off the smallpox. St. Nicaise had the smallpox and he asked the Lord [to preserve] whoever carried his name inscribed. O St. Nicaise! Thou illustrious bishop and martyr, pray for me, a sinner, and defend me by thy intercession from this disease. Amen.

A Benedictine abbey [fr] in Reims was later named in his honour.

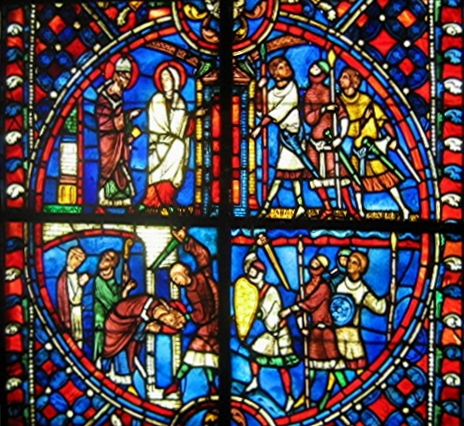
The life of Saint Nicasius

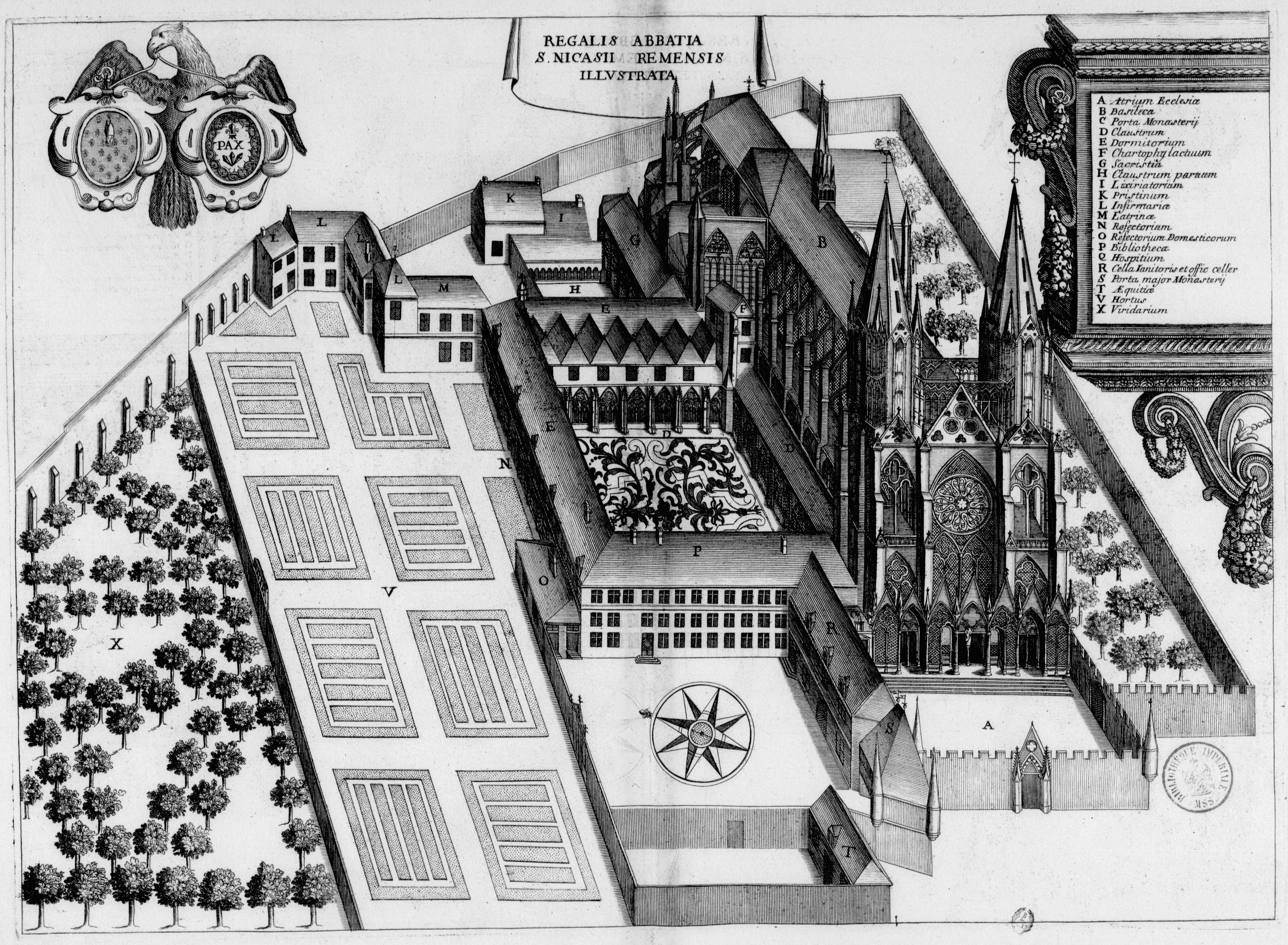
Saint Nicasius Abbey
