= Genesius of Arles =

Notary and martyr

Saint Genesius of Arles
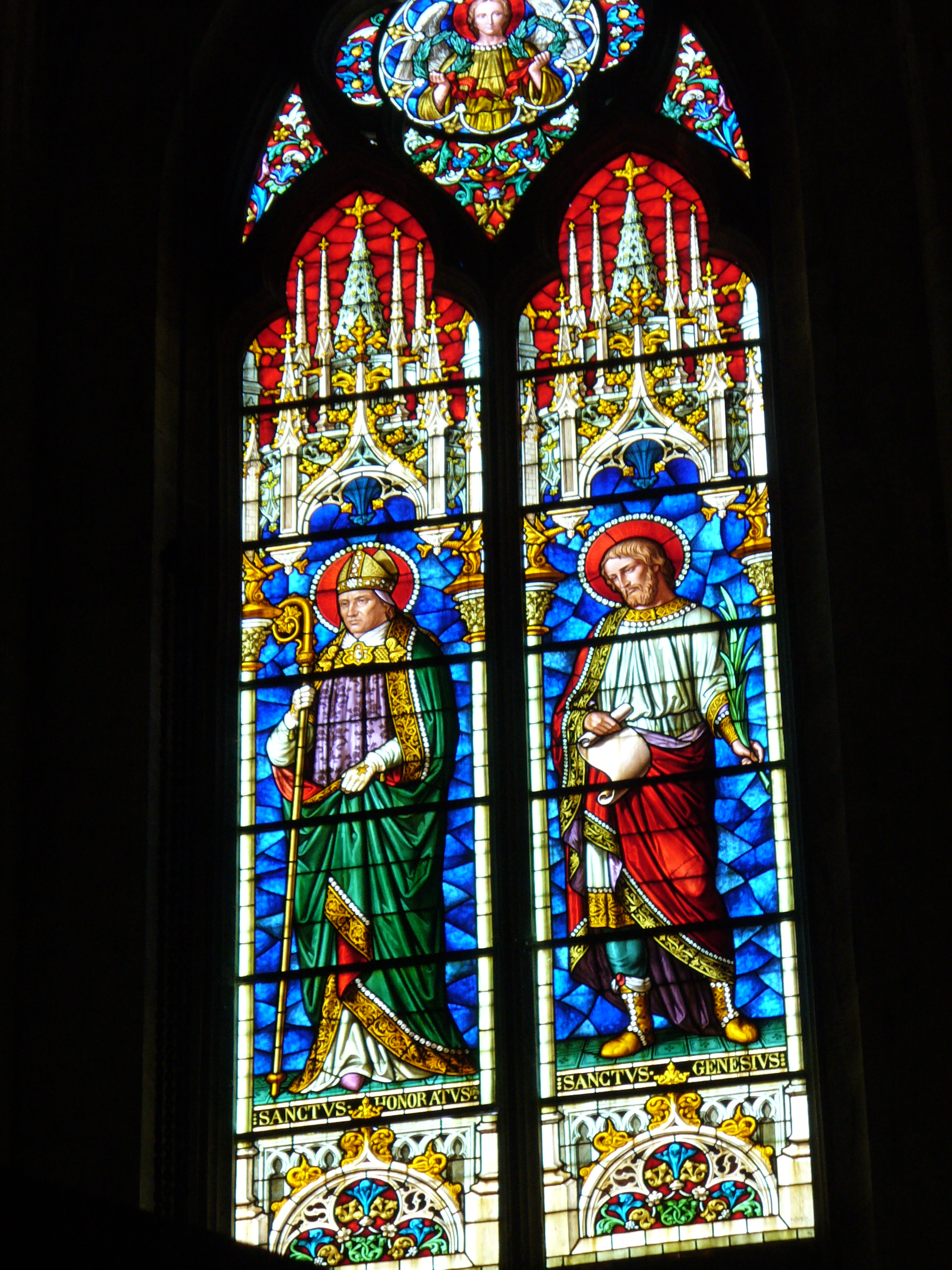
- Genesius of Arles (right) portrayed in a stained glass window. On the left is Saint Honoratus. Church of St. Trophime, Arles.

Saint
- Born: unknown Arles
- Died: 303 or 308
- Venerated in: Roman Catholic Church
- Major shrine: Arles
- Feast: August 25
- Attributes: palm of martyrdom; scroll
- Patronage: notaries

Genesius of Arles (or more precisely Genesius of Arelate, in French Genès) was a notary martyred under Maximianus in 303 or 308. He is honoured in the Catholic Church as the patron saint of notaries and secretaries, and invoked against chilblains and scurf. His feast day is celebrated on August 25.

== Acts ==
The Acts (Acta Santorum, Aug., V, 123, and Thierry Ruinart, 559), attributed to Paulinus of Nola, state: "Genesius, native of Arles, at first a soldier became known for his proficiency in writing, and was made secretary to the magistrate of Arles. While performing the duties of his office the decree of persecution against the Christians was read in his presence. Outraged in his ideas of justice, the young catechumen cast his tablets at the feet of the magistrate and fled. He was captured and executed, and thus received baptism in his own blood."

== Veneration ==
His veneration must be very old, as his name is found in the Martyrologium Hieronymianum. A church and altar dedicated to him at Arles were known in the 4th century. A 5th-century vita in the form of a sermon, Sermo de vita Genesii, is sometimes attributed to Hilary of Arles; in contrast to the hagiographical genre that followed, it minimizes the miraculous.

Genesius died as a martyr c. 303 AD. He is mentioned in several sources as having been martyred under the persecutions of Maximian and Diocletian.

The cult of Genesius spread quickly from Arles into other parts of the empire, including Rome, where a titular church was built. It was then assumed that he was a Roman martyr: hence "Genesius of Rome". Later on, even more confusion helped to create an entirely fictional legend, in which he was a comedian who had converted to Christianity half-way through performing an anti-Christian satire, and was then beheaded. This latter story began in the 6th century at the latest.

According to Serafino Prete, the spread and popularity of Genesius' cult in other cities of Gaul and beyond gave rise to the multiplication and "localization" of his cult, so that the saints Genesius of Alvernia, Genesius of Béziers, Genesius of Rome, Genesius of Cordoba and Genesius Sciarensis (also known as Ginés de la Jara) are actually variations on the same saint and saint's cult.

The feast day of Genesius is 25 August; the dedication of his basilica at Arles on 16 December. He is depicted as a secretary throwing down his tablets.

=== Cult in Spain ===
Some scholars believe that the Spanish saint known as Ginés de la Jara may be identical with Genesius of Arles, in Spanish known as Ginés de Arlés. Ginés' feast day is identical to that of Genesius of Arles, a connection that some scholars consider as proof that they are identical. A legend that appears in a manuscript dating from 1243, Liber Sancti Iacobi, states that the martyr of Arles was buried at Arles but that his head was transported miraculously "in the hands of angels" to Cartagena. This may represent an attempt to explain the existence of the cult of the same saint in two separate locations.

== See also ==
- Genesius of Rome, patron saint of actors, comedians, and entertainers

== Sources ==
- Patron Saints: Genesius of Arles
