= Ginés de la Jara =

Spanish saint

Saint Ginés de la Jara
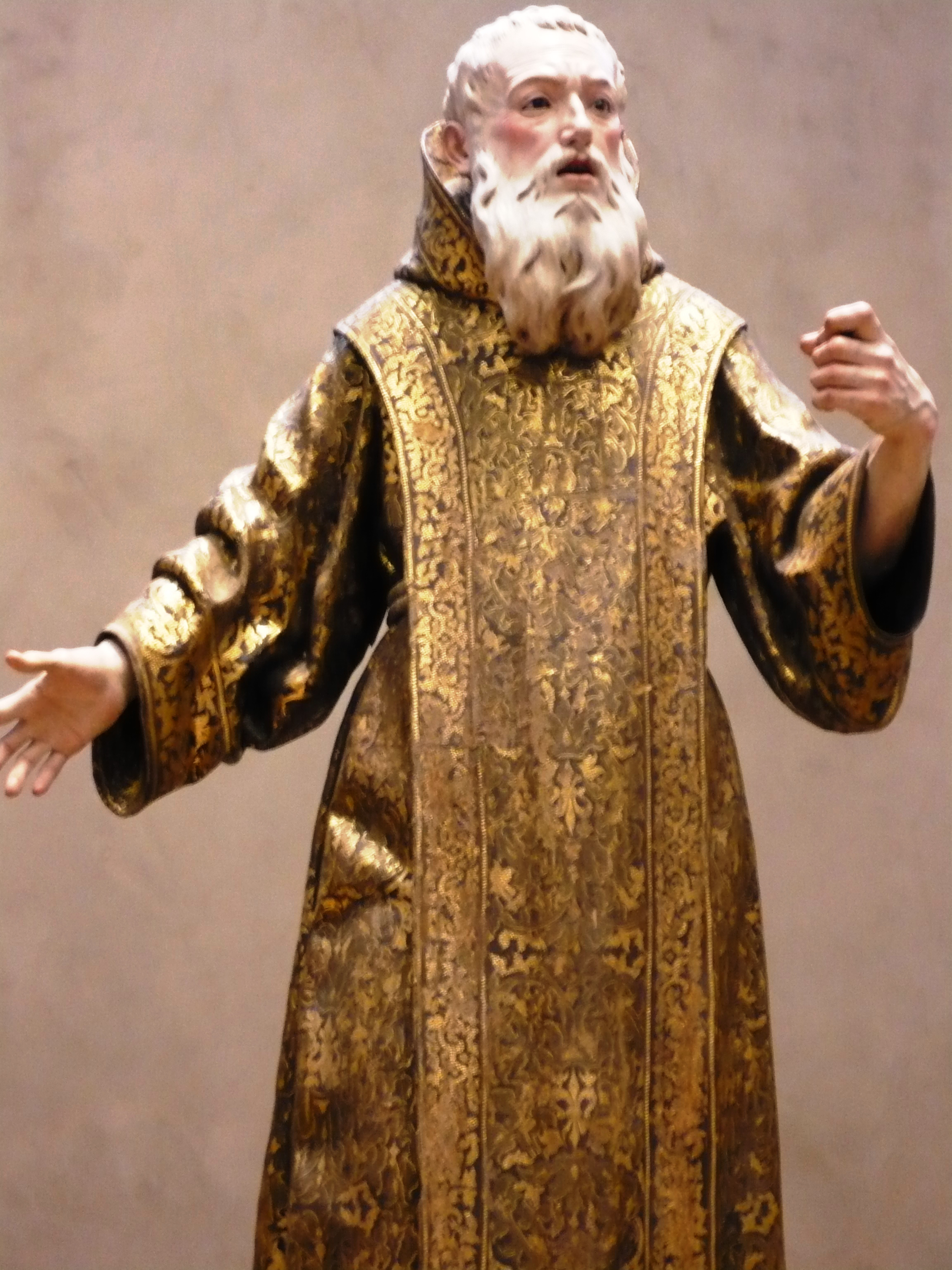
- Statue of Saint Ginés by La Roldana.
- Died: ? near Mar Menor, Murcia, Spain?
- Venerated in: Roman Catholic Church, Eastern Orthodox Church
- Canonized: 1541 by Pope Paul III
- Major shrine: monastery of San Ginés de la Jara
- Feast: 25 August
- Patronage: Cartagena, Spain; sailors; vintners; agricultural laborers; invoked against hernias and storms

Ginés de la Jara (also known as Ginés de la Xara, Ginés el Franco, Genesius Sciarensis) is a semi-legendary saint of Spain. He is associated with the region surrounding Cartagena, of which he is co-patron. A hermitage was founded adjacent to the Mar Menor, and ruins of a monastery bearing his name date from before the Moorish conquest of 711 AD, that is, from the Visigothic era.

== Historicity and legends ==
Pre-Christian or Muslim origins for the cult of Saint Ginés have been suggested, including identification with the cult of a Roman genius or with an Islamic jinn; as well as with an ancient Carthaginian site dedicated to the god Ba'al. The subsequent association of the site with Christian hermits and anchorites is indisputable. However, there is no actual tomb or sepulchre for Ginés: the location of his relics was a cause for the invention of multiple legends.

Some scholars believe he may be identical with Genesius of Arles, in Spanish known as San Ginés de Arlés, who was martyred in the 4th century. His feast day is identical to that of Genesius of Arles, a connection that some scholars consider as proof that they are identical. According to Serafino Prete, the spread and popularity of Genesius's cult in other cities of Gaul and beyond gave rise to the multiplication and "localization" of his cult, so that Genesius of Alvernia, Genesius of Béziers, Genesius of Rome, Genesius of Cordoba and Ginés de la Jara are actually variations on the same saint and saint's cult.

A legend that appears in a manuscript dating from 1243, Liber Sancti Iacobi, states that the martyr of Arles was buried at Arles but that his head was transported miraculously "in the hands of angels" to Cartagena. This may represent an attempt to explain the existence of the cult of the same saint in two separate locations. An additional variation on the legend states that after Ginés was decapitated in southern France, he picked up his head and threw it into the Rhône. The head was carried by sea to the coast of Murcia, where it was venerated as a relic.

No definite dates regarding his birth and death exist. However, a vigorous set of legends surrounding him arose. He is believed to have sailed from France around 800 AD and to have been shipwrecked on the Murcian coast, where he established a monastery. Another legend made him a kinsman of Roland. Ginés refused any claim to the throne of France. After his death, the coffin bearing his remains were brought to France. However, they were miraculously empty when they arrived there; the relics remained near the Mar Menor.

Additional stories state that he went on a pilgrimage to Compostela, having various adventures on the way. On the hill known as Cabezo del Miral, he remained until his death. His fame grew and his sepulchre became a place of pilgrimage. Miracles multiplied there.

== Veneration ==
The spot of Ginés' supposed hermitage at the Mar Menor survived as a sacred site during the age of Muslim rule (and was mentioned by Moorish authors). After the area’s conquest by the Castilians, Alfonso X of Castile restored the bishopric and founded the monastery of San Ginés de la Jara (1250). The site of his monastery was officially declared a holy place and place of pilgrimage by Alfonso X. It was a Dominican monastery before passing to the Franciscans.

The monastery, re-founded in 1491 and rebuilt in the 16th century, is the centre of the cult of this saint. It is considered the resting place of his relics. His cult has been described as essentially local, though it spread to nearby areas, such as Lorca, Murcia, Orihuela, and even North Africa.

Ginés inspired great devotion, and he was considered by local vintners their patron. He was considered the protector of agricultural labourers and of the fields. Sailors also invoked his aid against storms. He was also invoked against illnesses and conditions such as hernias in children.

In 1541, Pope Paul III officially canonized him. His feast day is 25 August.

Around 1692, La Roldana made a polychromed sculpture of Ginés de la Jara (now at the Getty Center).
