= Cephalophore =

Depiction of a martyred saint

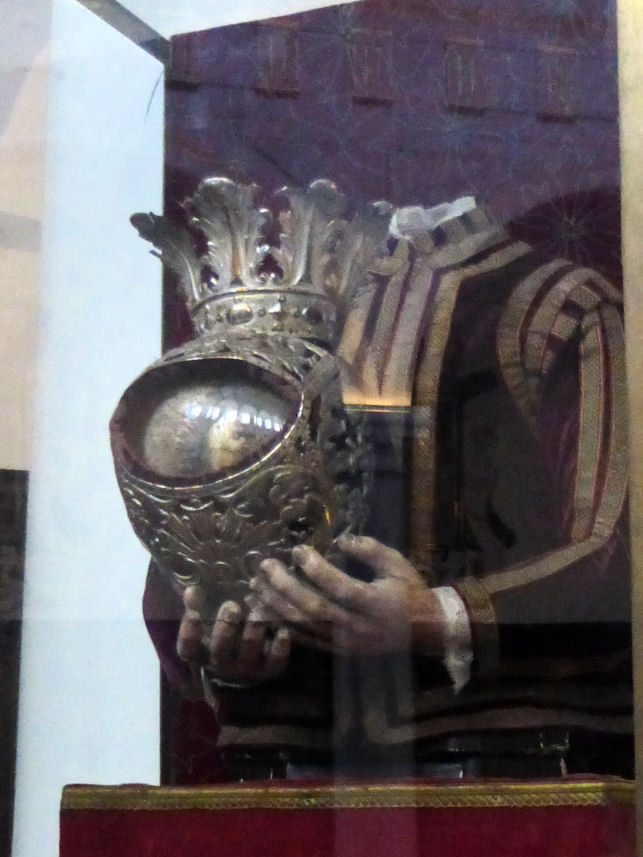
Relics of Saint Justus, Antwerp

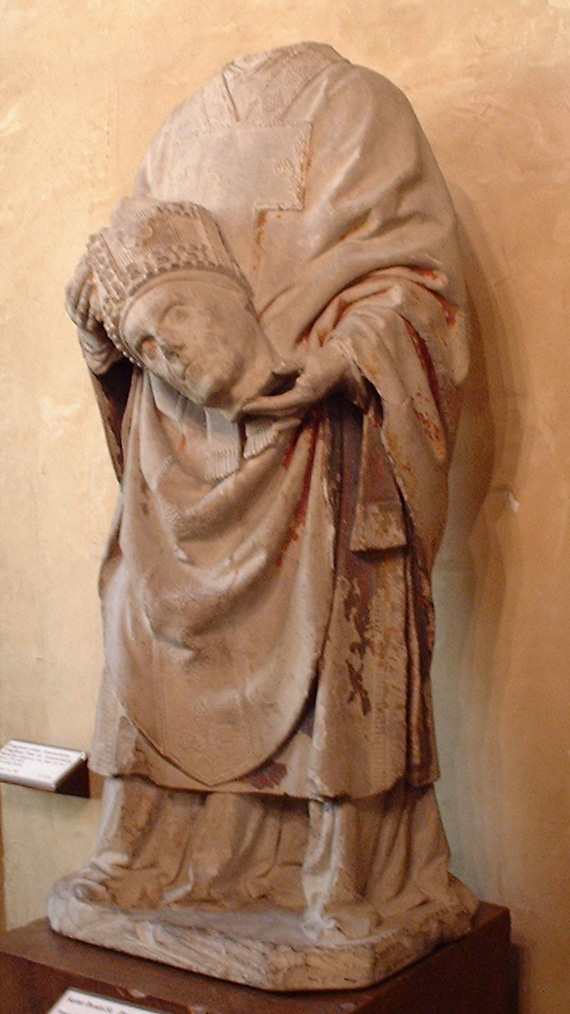
Denis of Paris

A cephalophore (from the Greek for 'head-carrier') is a saint who is generally depicted carrying their severed head. In Christian art, this was usually meant to signify that the subject in question had been martyred by beheading. Depicting the requisite halo in this circumstance offers a unique challenge for the artist: some put the halo where the head used to be, and others have the saint carrying the halo along with the head. Associated legends often tell of the saint standing and carrying their head after the beheading. In most Christian art, there is no halo on their head.

The term "cephalophore" was first used in a French article by Marcel Hébert, "Les martyrs céphalophores Euchaire, Elophe et Libaire", in Revue de l'Université de Bruxelles, v. 19 (1914).

== Possible origins ==
The topos can be traced to two sources. In a sermon on Saints Juventinus and Maximinus, John Chrysostom asserted that the severed head of a martyr was more terrifying to the devil than when it was able to speak. "He then compared soldiers showing their wounds received in the battle to martyrs holding their severed head in their hands and presenting it to Christ." The other source was the Western vita of Denis of Paris, founder of the see of Paris, who was identified in the text with Dionysius the Areopagite. John the Baptist, the best-known beheaded saint, is not considered a cephalophore, since he did not hold his head in his hands.

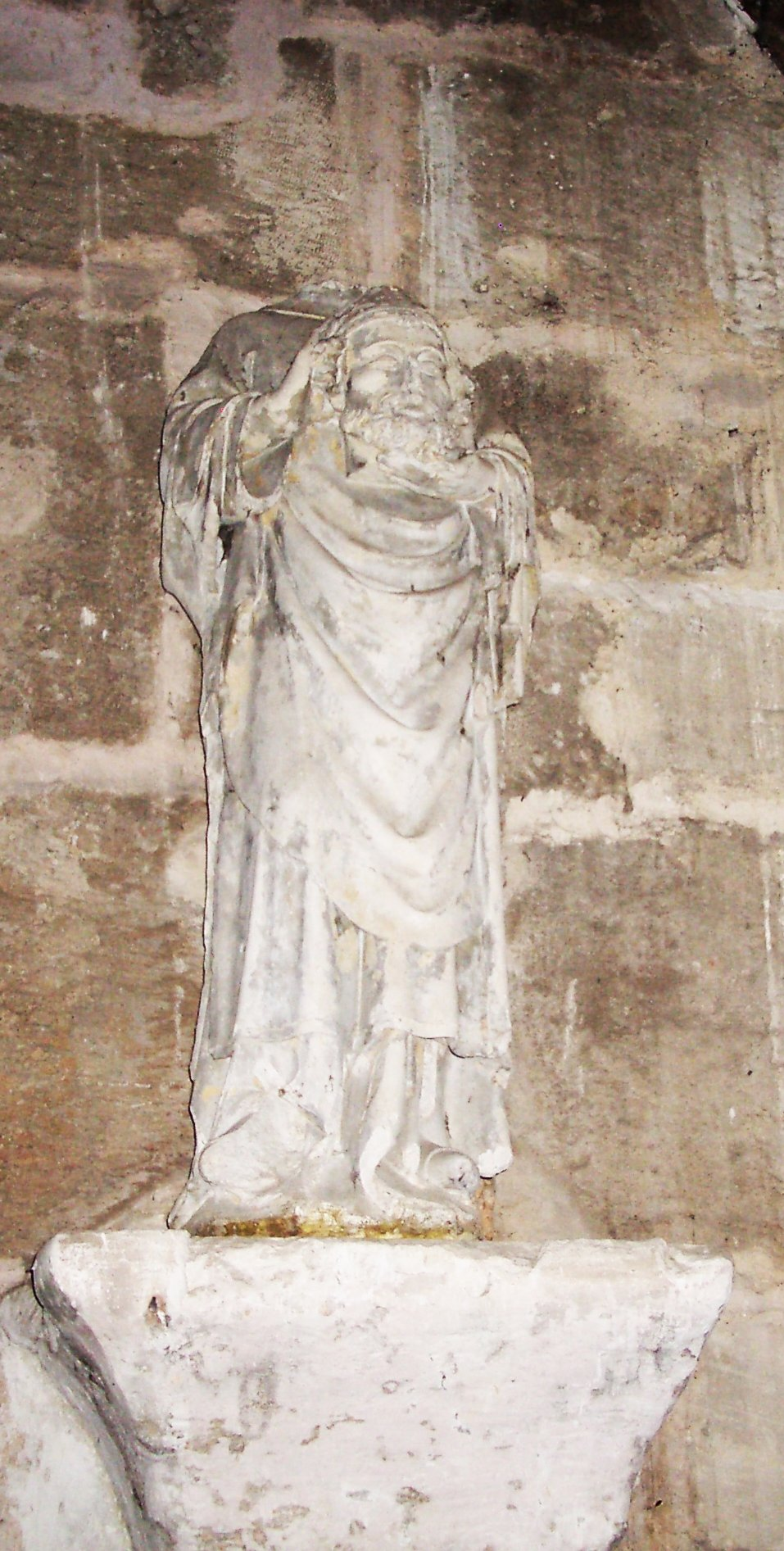
Saint Denis

Thus, an original and perhaps the most famous cephalophore is Denis, patron saint of Paris, who, according to the Golden Legend, miraculously preached with his head in his hands while journeying the seven miles from Montmartre to his burying place. Although St Denis is the best known of the saintly head-carriers, there were many others; the folklorist Émile Nourry counted 134 examples of cephalophory in French hagiographic literature alone. Given the frequency with which relics were stolen in medieval Europe, stories like this, in which a saint clearly indicates their chosen burial site, may have developed as a way of discouraging such acts of furta sacra.

== Examples of cephalophoric saints ==
A cephalophoric legend of Nicasius of Rheims tells that at the moment of his execution, Nicasius was reading Psalm 119 (Psalm 118 in the Vulgate). When he reached the verse "Adhaesit pavimento anima mea" ("My soul is attached unto dust") (verse 25), he was decapitated. After his head had fallen to the ground, Nicasius continued the psalm, adding, "Vivifica me, Domine, secundum verbum tuum" ("Revive me, Lord, with your words"). The theme of the speaking head is extended in the 8th-century Passio of Saint Justus of Beauvais. After the child had been beheaded by Roman soldiers, his father and brother found the corpse sitting with his head in his lap. Giving the head to his father, Justus asked him to carry it to Auxerre, so that his mother, Felicia, might kiss it.

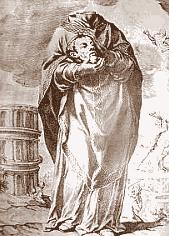
Saint Aphrodisius, a martyr of Alexandria, venerated at Béziers

The legend of Aphrodisius of Alexandria was transferred to Béziers, where his name was inserted at the head of the list of bishops. In the hagiographic accounts, Aphrodisius was accompanied by his camel. As he was preaching, a group of pagans pressed through the crowd and beheaded him on the spot. Aphrodisius picked up his head and carried it to the chapel he had recently consecrated at the site. It is identified today as Place Saint-Aphrodise, Béziers. Himerius of Bosto is said to have survived his decapitation and, after collecting his head, climbed on horseback. He rode to meet his uncle, a bishop, on a small mountain before he finally died.

A legend associated with Ginés de la Jara states that after he was decapitated in southern France, he picked up his head and threw it into the Rhône. The head was carried by sea to the coast of Cartagena, Spain, where it was venerated as a relic (Cartagena was the centre of this saint's cult).

In the Golden Legend, Paul the Apostle at his martyrdom "stretched forth his neck, and so was beheaded. And as soon as the head was from the body, it said: Jesus Christus! which had been to Jesus or Christus, or both, fifty times." When the head was recovered and was to be rejoined to the body as a relic, in response to a prayer for confirmation that this was indeed the right head, the body of Paul turned to rejoin the head that had been set at its feet.

In legend, the female saint Osgyth stood up after her execution, picking up her head like Denis of Paris and other cephalophoric martyrs and walking with it in her hands to the door of a local convent before collapsing there. Similarly, Valerie of Limoges carried her severed head away to her confessor, Saint Martial.

Cuthbert is often depicted with his head on his neck/shoulders and carrying a second head in his hands. However, he is not a cephalophore. The second head is that of Saint Oswald of Northumbria, who was buried with him at Durham Cathedral.

Saint Denis of Paris has sometimes been noted as the most famous amongst the Cephalophores—and perhaps the archetype of this genre in hagiography. “It is only first step that matters,” said one of the later commentaries of St. Denis’s seven mile walk from the site of his execution (near Montmartre) to the banks of the Seine.

== In literature ==
In Dante's Divine Comedy (Canto 28) the poet meets the spectre of the troubadour Bertrand de Born in the eighth circle of the Inferno, carrying his severed head in his hand, slung by its hair, like a lantern; upon seeing Dante and Virgil, the head begins to speak.

The speaking severed head appears memorably in Sir Gawain and the Green Knight.

The motif Head in Stith Thompson's Motif-Index of Folk Literature reveals how universal is the "anomaly" of the talking severed head. Aristotle is at pains to discredit talking heads' stories and establish the physical impossibility of the windpipe severed from the lung. "Moreover," he adds, "among the barbarians, where heads are chopped off with great rapidity, nothing of the kind has ever occurred." Aristotle was doubtless familiar with the story of the singing disembodied head of Orpheus and Homer's image of heads severed so rapidly they seemed still to be speaking, and Latin examples could be attested. A link between Latin poets and the Middle Ages in transmitting the trope of the speaking head was noted by Beatrice White, in the Latin poem on the Trojan War, De Bello Troiano by Joseph of Exeter. Hector whirls in the air the severed head of Patroclus, which whispers "Ultor ubi Aeacides", "Where is Achilles [Aeacides], my avenger?"

Some modern authors link the legends of cephalophores miraculously walking with their heads in their hands to the Celtic cult of heads.

== Gallery ==
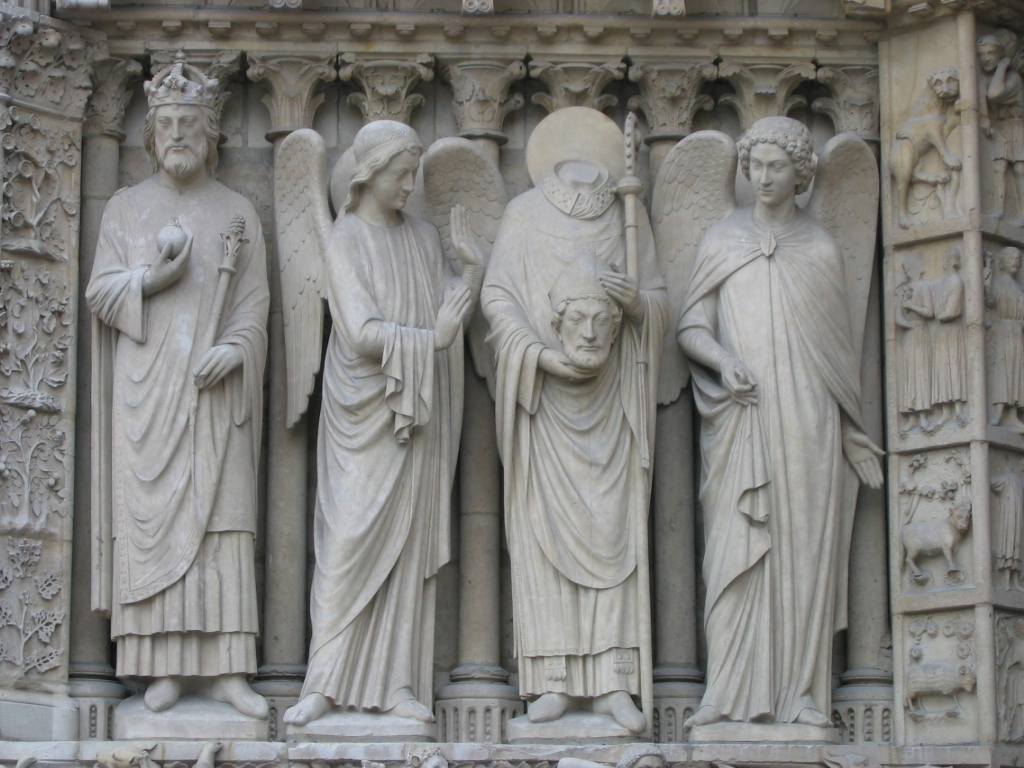
St. Denis (second from right) has angelic companions showing him polite concern; portal from Notre Dame de Paris (probably 19th century replacements)

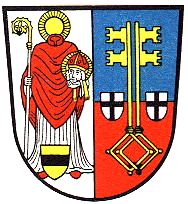
Saint Denis has two halos in the coat of arms of Krefeld

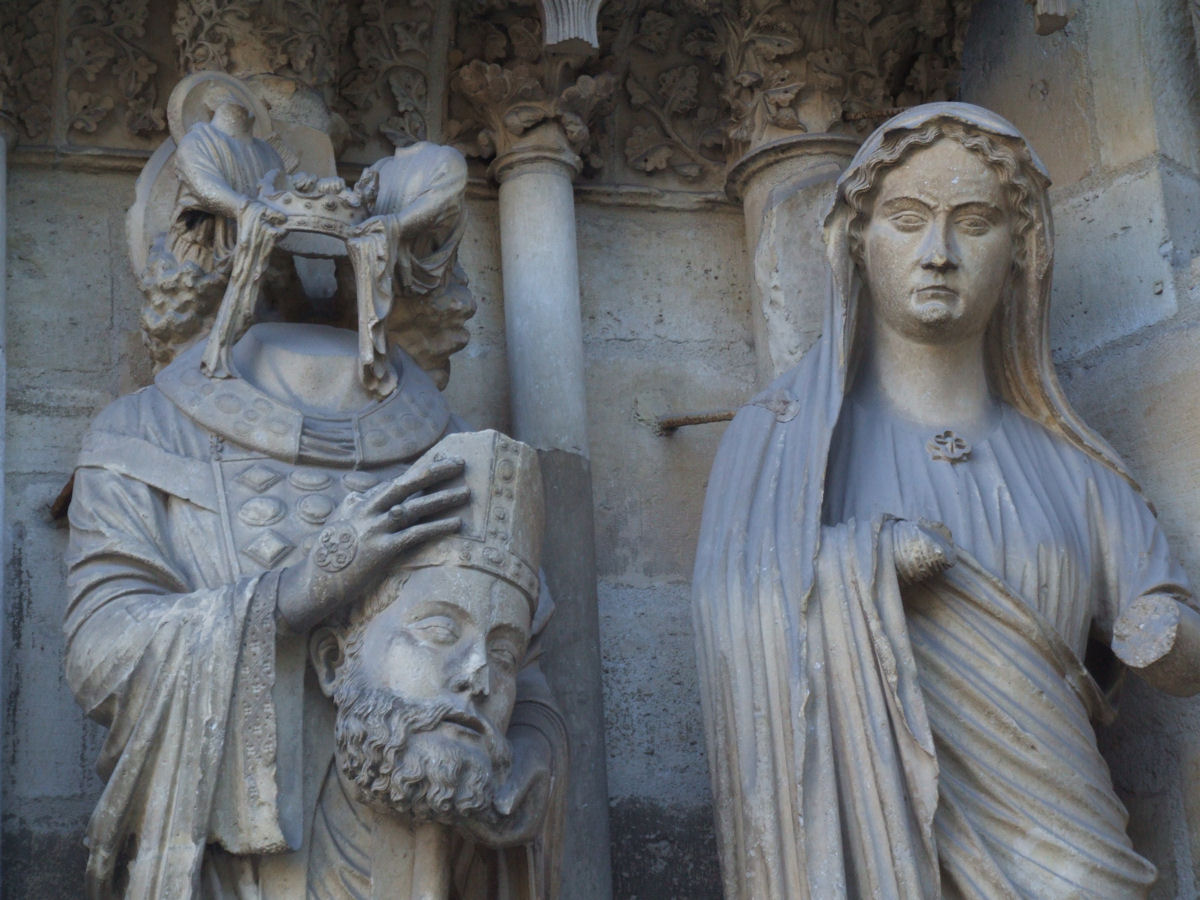
Cephalophore, Cathedral of Reims

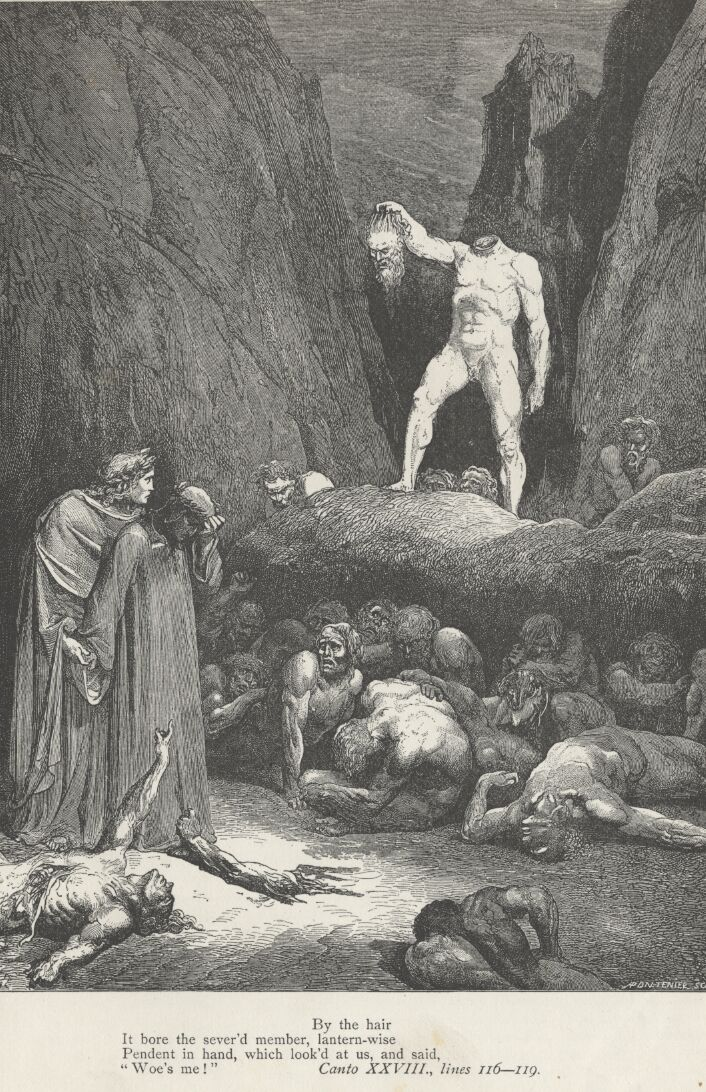
Gustave Doré's illustration of the scene from Dante's Inferno

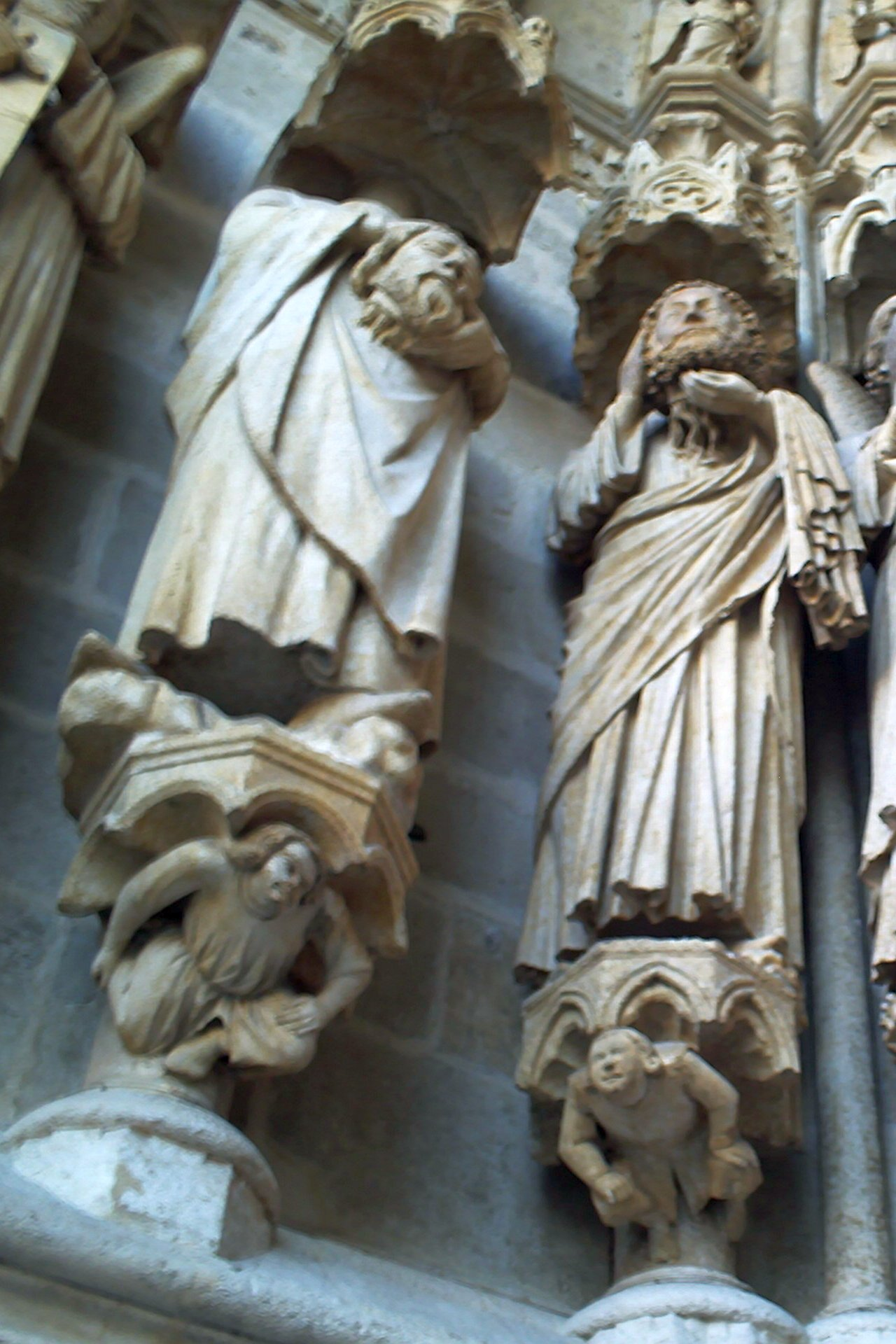
Saints Victoricus and Gentian West entrance, Amiens Cathedral

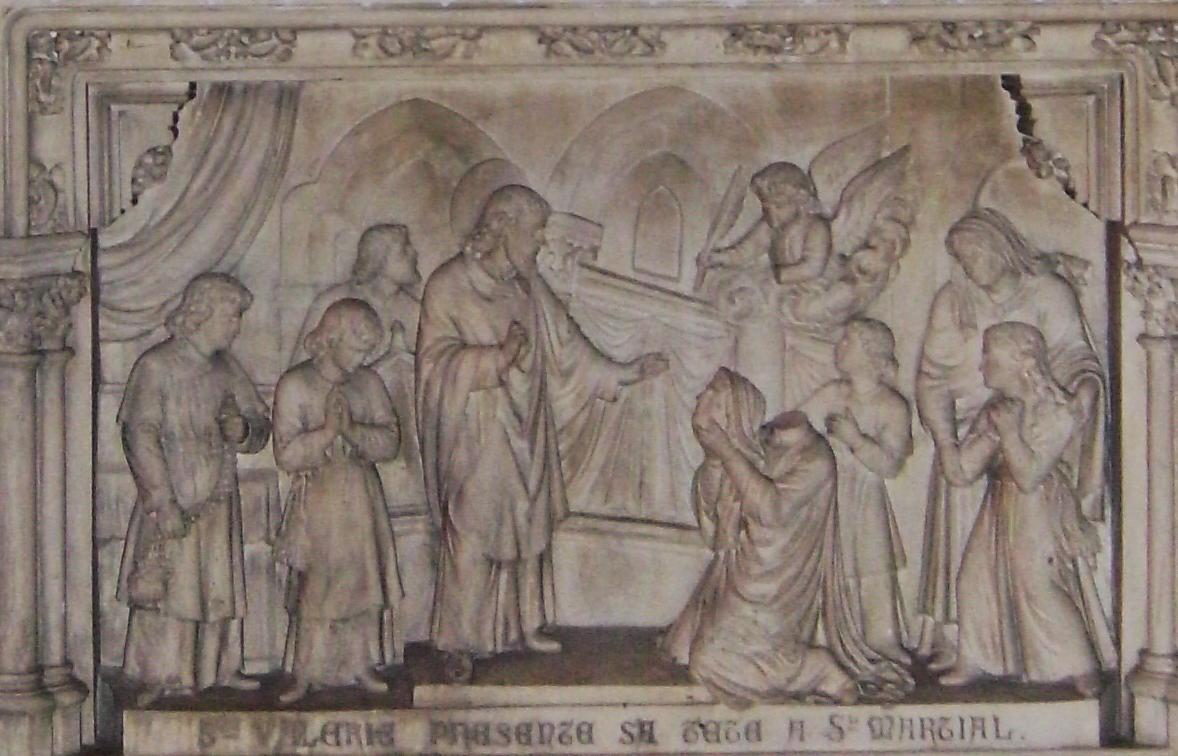
St. Valerie of Limoges presents her head to her bishop and confessor, Saint Martial; Church of St. Michel des Lions, Limoges

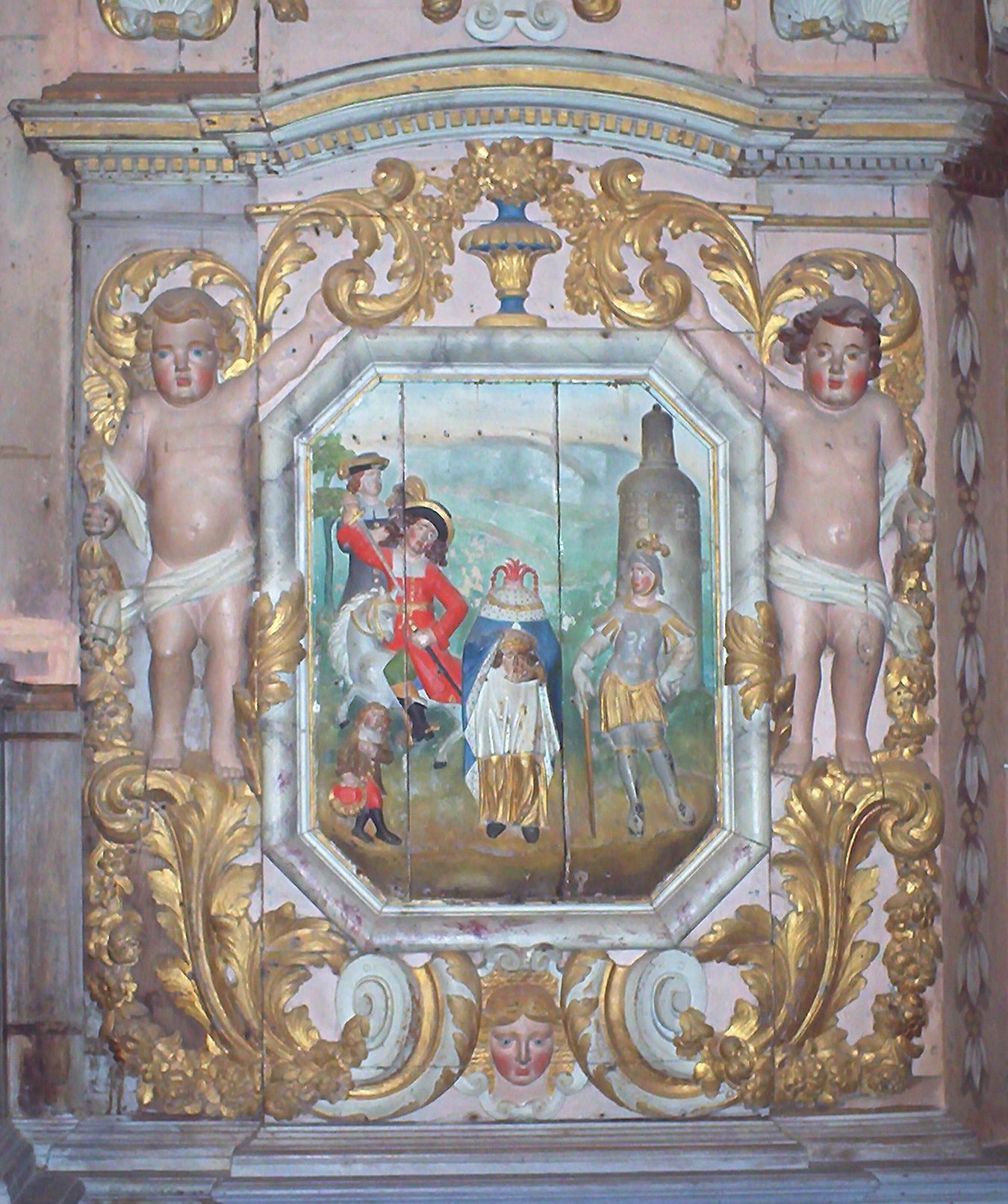
The martyrdom of St. Miliau, who holds his severed head as blood gushes from his neck. Retable of the Passion at Lampaul-Guimiliau.

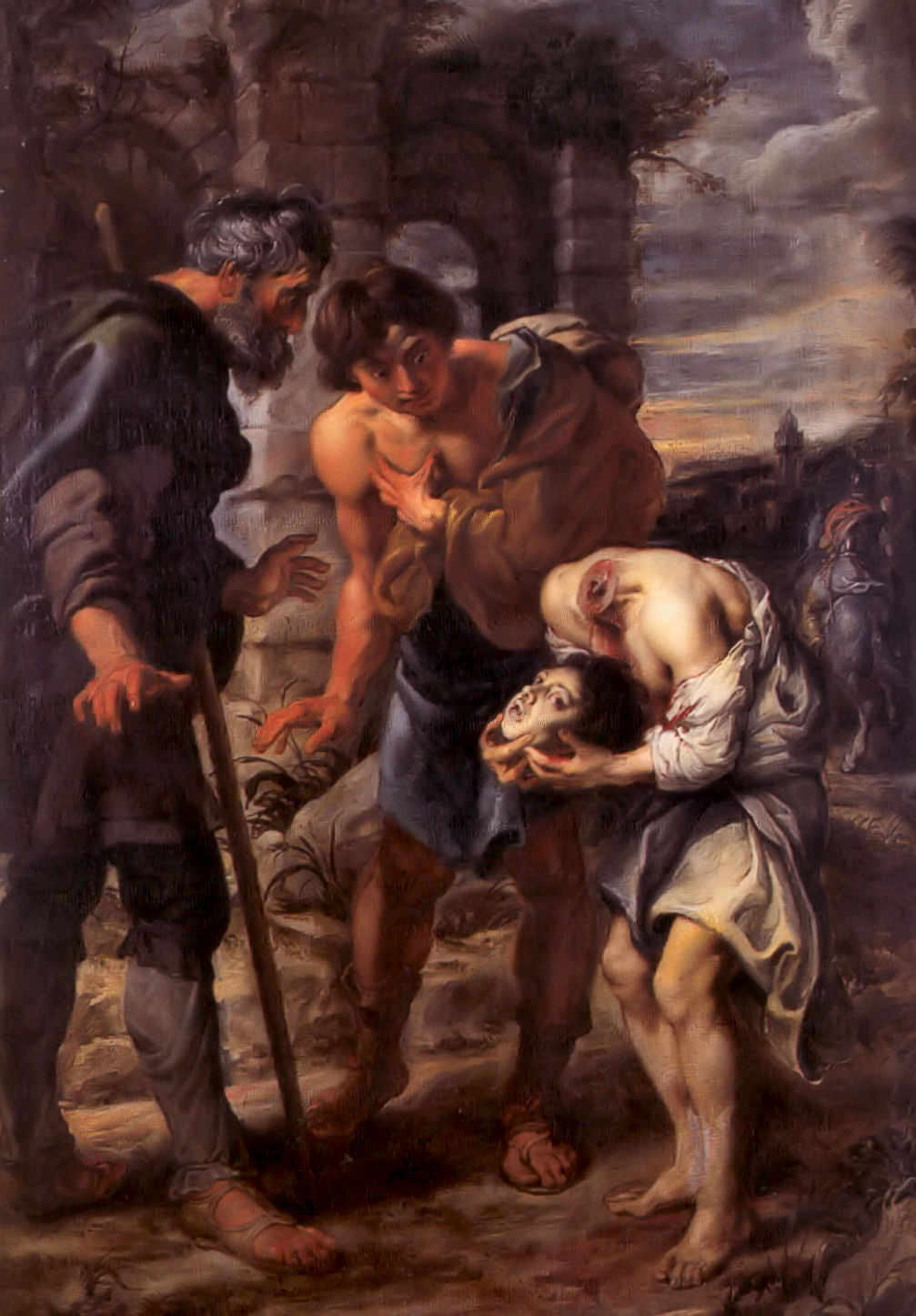
The Miracle of Saint Justus, Peter Paul Rubens

== List of cephalophores ==
- Alban
- Alban of Mainz
- Aphrodisius
- Aventin de Larboust
- Chrysolius
- Decuman
- Denis of Paris
- Domninus of Fidenza
- Eliphius
- Emygdius
- Eurosia (Orosia)
- Felix and Regula
- Ferjeux de Besançon
- Ferreolus de Besançon
- Frajou
- Gaudens
- Gemolo
- Génitour du Blanc
- Ginés de la Jara
- Gohard de Nantes
- Hilarian d'Espalion
- Justinian of Ramsey Island
- Justus of Beauvais
- Juthwara
- Lambert of Saragosse
- Laureanus of Hungary (Seville, Spain; Vatan, France)
- Libaire de Grand
- Livier de Marsal
- Lucian of Beauvais
- Maurin d'Agen
- Maurice
- Miliau
- Minias of Florence
- Mitre
- Nectan of Hartland
- Nicasius of Rheims
- Nicasius, Quirinus and Scubiculus
- Noyale
- Osyth
- Qutham ibn Abbas
- Piat of Tournai
- Principin (Auvergne)
- Quiteria (Quitterie)
- Reverianus
- Saturnina
- Solange
- Theonistus
- Trémeur
- Tréphine
- Valerie of Limoges
- Vitores de Cerezo
- Vukašin of Klepci
- Winefride
- Wyllow

== See also ==
- Saint symbology
- Dullahan
- Headless Rider urban legend
- Chhinnamasta – a Hindu goddess holding her own severed head
- Beheading game – Motif of medieval romance
- Decapitation – Complete separation of the head from the body
- Headhunting – Practice of hunting a human and collecting the severed head after killing the victim
- Headless priest
- Shrunken head
- With Her Head Tucked Underneath Her Arm
