= Himerius of Bosto =

Saint Himerius of Bosto
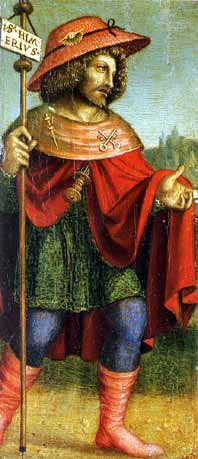
- Died: c. 11th century
- Venerated in: Roman Catholic Church
- Feast: 4 February
- Attributes: Depicted as a pilgrim being stabbed; pilgrim's cloak and staff

Saint Himerius (Imerio, Imier) of Bosto is venerated as a pilgrim and martyr. He is venerated in the province of Varese jointly with Gemolus (Gemolo), who was martyred with him. (Some scholars believe that the two figures are the same man.)

A tradition from the eleventh century holds that Himerius and Gemolus were Nordic companions of a bishop who was travelling ad limina apostolorum–that is, on a pilgrimage to the sepulchres of St. Peter and St. Paul at Rome, i.e., to the Basilica of St. Peter and to the Basilica of Saint Paul Outside the Walls.

Himerius and Gemolus were killed during an assault on the bishop's entourage at Valganna by a band of men from Uboldo or Seprio. Gemolus was buried at Ganna, where an abbey dedicated to him arose in 1095, built by Atto (Attone), Ardericus (Arderico), Inghizo (Inghizone) with the permission of Arnulf III, Archbishop of Milan.

Himerius, who escaped, eventually succumbed to his wounds at Varese, where he was buried in the church of San Michele at Bosto. The church was later named after him.

== Another version of their story ==
A further elaboration states that Himerius and Gemolus pursued their attackers and that Gemolus was in fact the bishop's nephew. Camped for the night at Valganna, the bishop was robbed of his horse and other valuables by a band of brigands from Uboldo. Gemolus and Himerius pursued the brigands and caught up with them. Gemolus demanded the booty back in the name of God and the Apostles Peter and Paul. The brigands refused and cut his head off. They attacked Himerius, who escaped but later died.

Gemolus survived the decapitation and, in the tradition of the cephalophores, collected his own head, climbed on horseback, and reunited with his uncle the bishop on a small mountain before he finally died. The bishop buried him on that spot and erected a small church dedicated to Saint Michael, patron saint of the Lombards and protector of cemeteries.

== Veneration ==
Gemolo's relics were determined to be authentic by a commission set up in 1941, which was headed by Cardinal Ildefonso Schuster. The saints are mentioned in two historical sources: the Liber Notitiae Sanctorum Mediolani, a manuscript of the 13th century, attributed to Goffredo da Bussero and conserved in the archepiscopal archives of Milan; and the Gospel of the Passion, which is guarded in the archives of the Abbey of Ganna.

Rocks stained red with a particular algae found near the Abbey of Ganna were identified with the drops of Gemolus' blood in popular tradition. This led the monks to construct a second oratory some distance from the road in the 14th century to accommodate veneration of this particular natural phenomenon.
