= Saint-Just-en-Chaussée =

- Commune
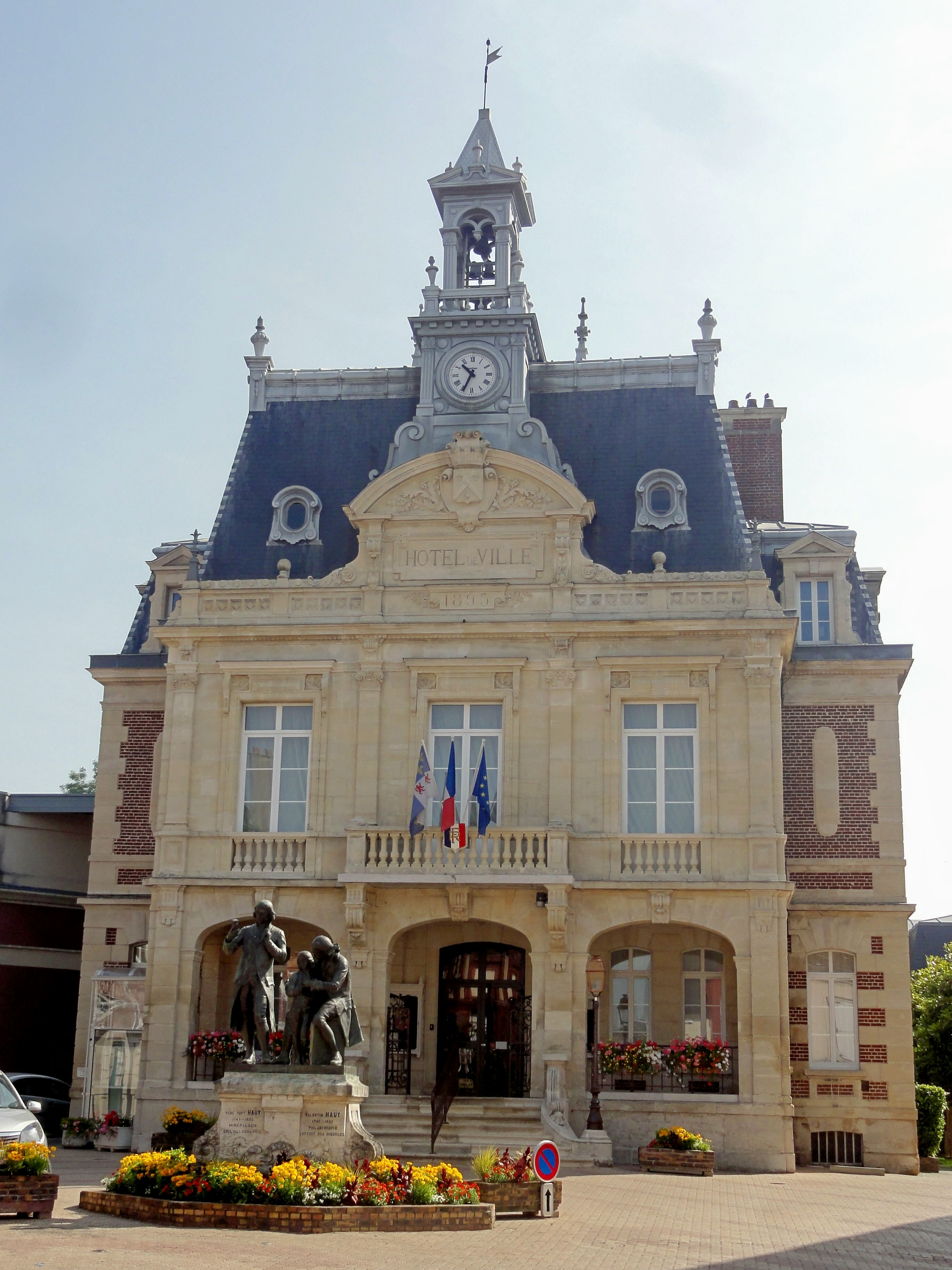
- The town hall in Saint-Just-en-Chaussé

- Coat of arms
- Location of Saint-Just-en-Chaussée
- Location within France Location within Hauts-de-France
- Coordinates: 49°30′24″N 2°25′54″E
- Country: France
- Region: Hauts-de-France
- Department: Oise
- Arrondissement: Clermont
- Canton: Saint-Just-en-Chaussée
- Intercommunality: Plateau Picard

Government
  - Mayor (2023–2026): Bernard Dubouil
- Area^{1}: 14.66 km^{2} (5.66 sq mi)
- Elevation: 96 m (315 ft)
- Highest elevation: 172 m (564 ft)
- Lowest elevation: 86 m (282 ft)
- Population (2023): 5,810
  - Density: 396/km^{2} (1,030/sq mi)
- Time zone: UTC+01:00 (CET)
  - Summer (DST): UTC+02:00 (CEST)
- INSEE/Postal code: 60581 /60130
- ^{1} French Land Register data, which excludes lakes, ponds, glaciers > 1 km^{2} (0.386 sq mi or 247 acres) and river estuaries.

Saint-Just-en-Chaussée (French pronunciation: [sɛ̃ ʒy(st) ɑ̃ ʃose]; Picard: Saint-Just-in-Cœuchie) is a commune in the Oise department in northern France. Saint-Just-en-Chaussée station has rail connections to Amiens, Creil and Paris.

== History ==
Its name refers to Saint Justus of Beauvais, who is said to have been martyred at this spot.

== Population ==
Historical population
Year	Pop.	±% p.a.
1968	3,722	—
1975	4,063	+1.26%
1982	4,257	+0.67%
1990	4,927	+1.84%
1999	5,498	+1.23%
2007	5,519	+0.05%
2012	5,818	+1.06%
2017	6,013	+0.66%
2023	5,810	−0.57%
Source: INSEE

== Personalities ==
Valentin Haüy and René Just Haüy (brothers) were born in Saint-Just-en-Chaussée.

== See also ==
- Communes of the Oise department
