= Denis of Paris =

3rd-century Bishop of Paris and saint

Saint Denis of Paris
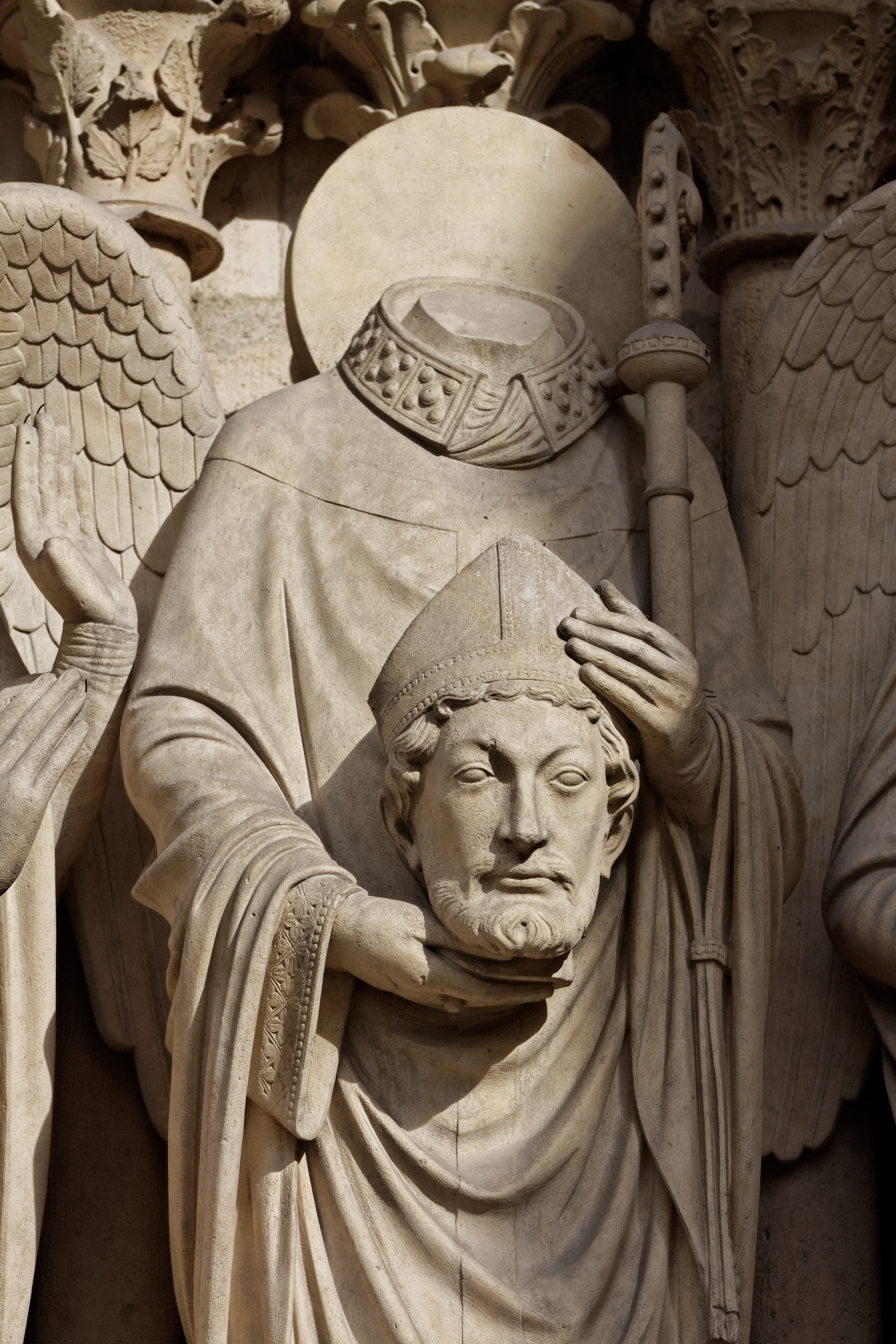
- Saint Denis holding his head. Statue at the left portal of Notre Dame de Paris.

Bishop and Martyr
- Born: 3rd century Italia, Roman Empire
- Died: c. 250, 258, or 270; Mons Martis, Lutetia, Roman Gaul (modern day Paris, France)
- Venerated in: Catholic Church; Anglican Communion; Eastern Orthodox Church
- Major shrine: Saint Denis Basilica
- Feast: 9 October
- Attributes: A martyr carrying his severed head in his hands; a bishop's mitre; city; furnace
- Patronage: Paris; against frenzy, strife, headaches, hydrophobia, San Dionisio (Parañaque), possessed people

Denis of Paris (Latin: Dionysius) was a 3rd-century Christian martyr and saint. According to his hagiographies, he was bishop of Paris (then Lutetia) in the third century and, together with his companions Rusticus and Eleutherius, was martyred for his faith by decapitation. Some accounts placed this during Domitian's persecution and incorrectly identified St Denis of Paris with the Areopagite who was converted by Paul the Apostle and who served as the first bishop of Athens. Assuming Denis's historicity, it is now considered more likely that he suffered under the persecution of the emperor Decius shortly after 250 AD.

Denis is the most famous cephalophore in Christian history, with a popular story claiming that the decapitated bishop picked up his head and walked several miles while preaching a sermon on repentance. He is venerated in the Catholic Church as a patron saint of both France and Paris and is one of the Fourteen Holy Helpers. A chapel was raised at the site of his burial by a local Christian woman; it was later expanded into an abbey and basilica, around which grew up the French city of Saint-Denis, now a suburb of Paris.

== Name ==
The medieval and modern French masculine given name Denis derives from the Latin name Dionysius from Greek Dionysios.

== Life ==
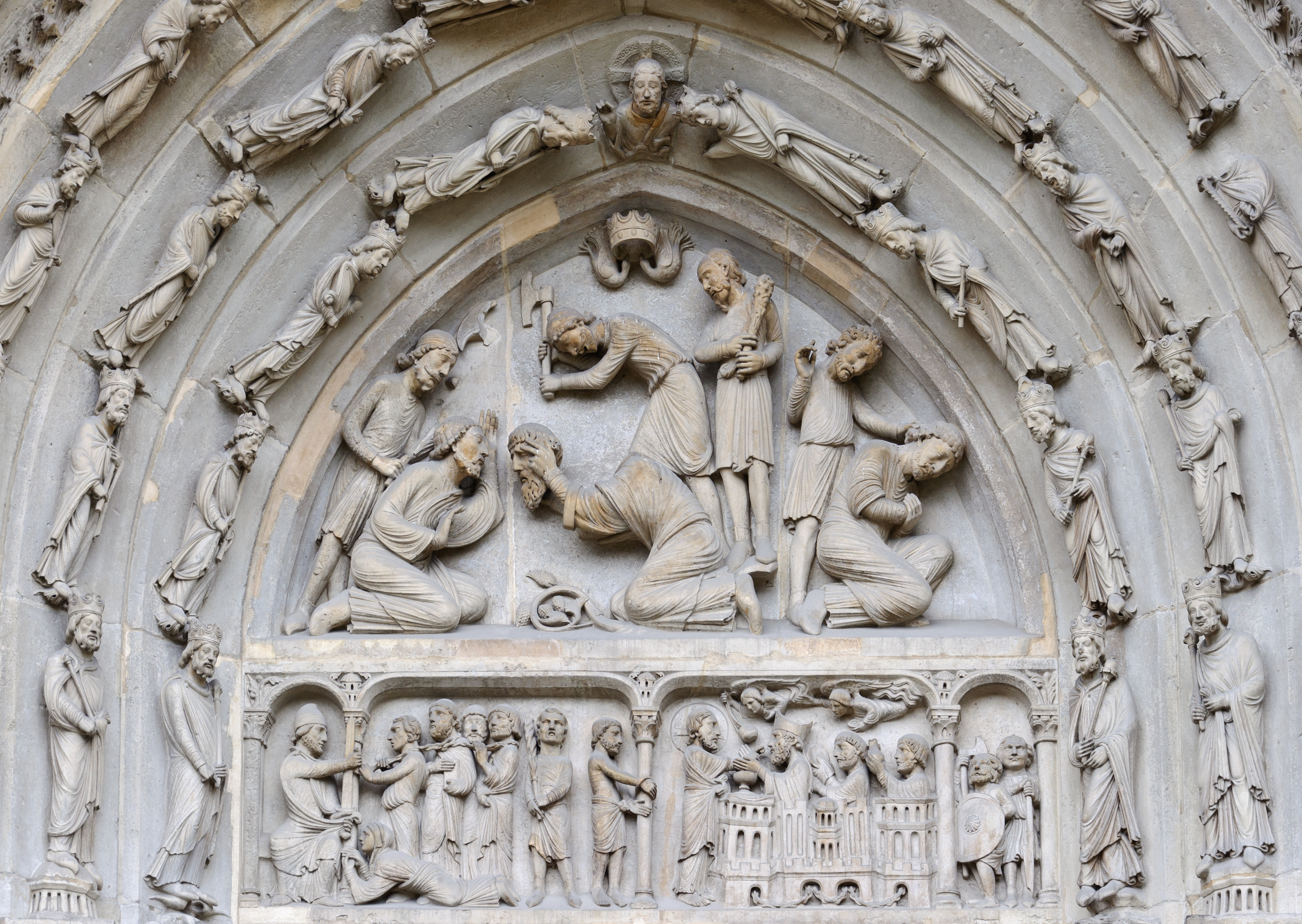
Beheading of Denis and of his companions, tympanum of the north portal of the Basilica of Saint-Denis

Gregory of Tours states that Denis was bishop of the Parisii and was martyred by being beheaded by a sword. The earliest document giving an account of his life and martyrdom, the "Passio SS. Dionysii Rustici et Eleutherii", dates from c. 600, is mistakenly attributed to the poet Venantius Fortunatus, and is legendary. Nevertheless, it appears from the Passio that Denis was sent from Italia to convert Gaul in the third century, forging a link with the "apostles to the Gauls" reputed to have been sent out with six other missionary bishops under the direction of Pope Fabian. There Denis was appointed first Bishop of Paris. The persecutions under Emperor Decius had all but dissolved the small Christian community at Lutetia (Paris). Denis, with his inseparable companions Rusticus and Eleutherius, who were martyred with him, settled on the Île de la Cité in the River Seine. Roman Paris lay on the higher ground of the Left Bank, away from the river.

=== Martyrdom ===
Denis and his companions were so effective in converting people that the pagan priests became alarmed over their loss of followers. At their instigation, the Roman Governor arrested the missionaries. After a long imprisonment, Denis and two of his clergy were executed by beheading on the highest hill in Paris (now Montmartre), which was likely to have been a druidic holy place. The martyrdom of Denis and his companions is popularly believed to have given the site its current name, derived from the Latin Mons Martyrum "The Martyrs' Mountain", although the name is possibly derived from Mons Mercurii et Mons Martis, Hill of Mercury and Mars. After his head was cut off, Denis is said to have picked it up and walked several miles from the summit of the hill, preaching a sermon the entire way, making him one of many cephalophores in hagiology. Of the many accounts of this martyrdom, this is noted in detail in the Golden Legend and in Butler's Lives of the Saints. The site where he stopped preaching and actually died was marked by a small shrine that developed into the Basilica of Saint-Denis, which became the burial place for the kings of France. Another account has his corpse being thrown into the Seine, but recovered and buried later that night by his converts.

== Veneration ==
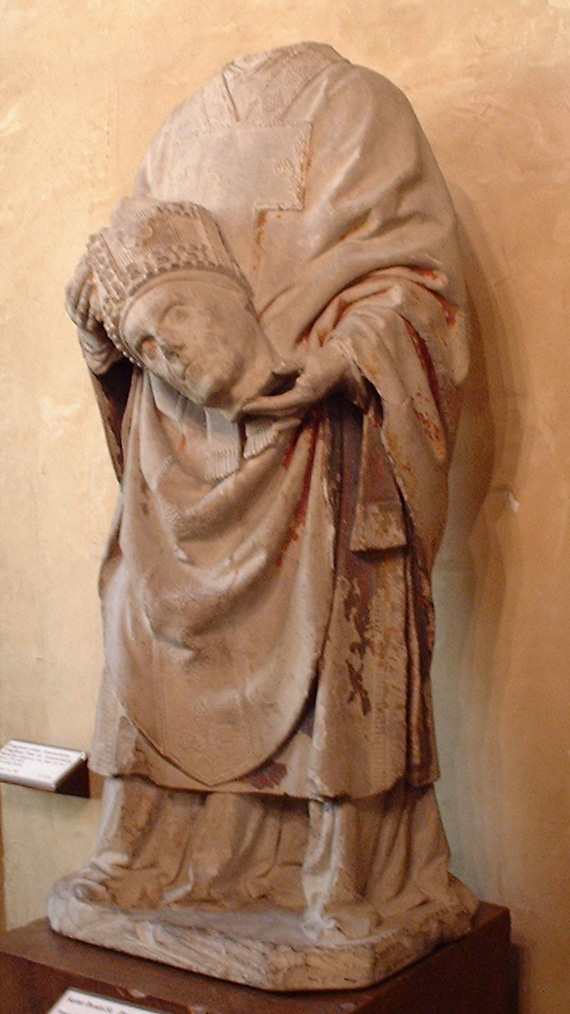
Late Gothic statue of Saint Denis, limestone, formerly polychromed (Musée de Cluny)

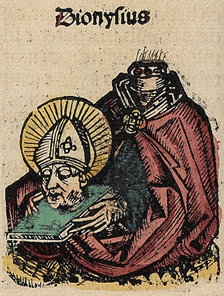
St Denis in the Nuremberg Chronicle

Veneration of Denis began soon after his death. The bodies of Denis, Eleutherius, and Rusticus were buried on the spot of their martyrdom, where the construction of the eponymous basilica was begun by Genevieve, assisted by the people of Paris. Her Vita Sanctae Genovefae attests the presence of a shrine near the present basilica by the close of the fifth century.

Dagobert I, great-grandson of Chlothar I, had the first Royal Basilica built. The Merovingian tradition was, originally, to bury kings such as Clovis and Chlothildis in Paris at Abbey St-Genevieve/Genovefa, as Clovis had ordered its construction in 502 AD. Yet Chilperic I had his own mother, Dowager Queen Aregunda, buried at Saint-Denis. His grandson was clearly following a family tradition. Aregunda's (death about 580 AD) tomb was discovered in 1959, and her burial items can be seen at the Saint-Germain-en-Laye museum. A successor church was erected by Fulrad, who became abbot in 749/50 and was closely linked with the accession of the Carolingians to the Merovingian throne.

In time, St Denis came to be regarded as the patron saint of the French people, with St Louis the patron of the monarchy and royal dynasties. Saint Denis or Montjoie! Saint Denis! became the typical war-cry of the French armies. The oriflamme, which became the standard of France, was the banner consecrated upon his tomb. His veneration spread beyond France when, in 754, Pope Stephen II brought the veneration of Saint Denis to Rome. Soon his cultus was prevalent throughout Europe. Abbot Suger removed the relics of Denis, and those associated with Rustique and Eleuthére, from the crypt, to reside under the high altar of the Saint-Denis he rebuilt, 1140–1144.

In traditional Catholic practice, Saint Denis is honoured as one of the Fourteen Holy Helpers. Specifically, Denis is invoked against diabolical possession and headaches and with Geneviève is one of the patron saints of Paris.

== Feast ==
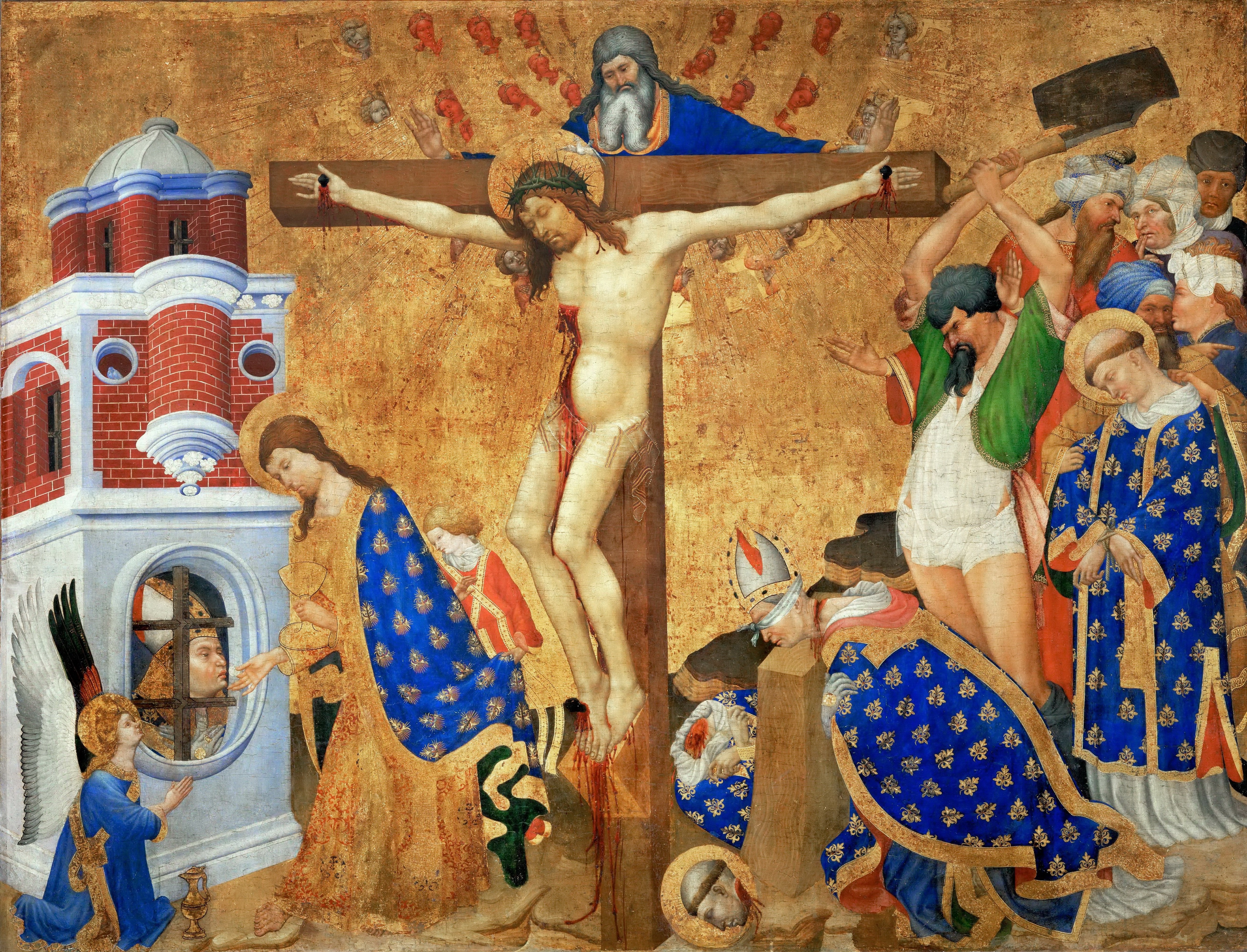
Last Communion and Martyrdom of Saint Denis, by Henri Bellechose, 1416, which shows the martyrdom of both Denis and his companions

9 October is celebrated as the feast of Saint Denis and companions, a priest named Rusticus and a deacon, Eleutherius, who were martyred alongside him and buried with him. The names Rusticus and Eleutherius are non-historical. The feast of Saint Denis was added to the Roman Calendar in the year 1568 by Pope Pius V, although it had been celebrated since at least the year 800.

Saint Denis is also remembered with a commemoration in many Anglican Provinces, including the Church of England and the Anglican Church of Canada, on October 9.

== Confusion with Dionysius the Areopagite ==
Since at least the ninth century, the legends of Dionysius the Areopagite and Denis of Paris have often been confused. Around 814, Louis the Pious brought certain writings attributed to Dionysius the Areopagite to France, and since then it became common among the French legendary writers to argue that Denis of Paris was the same Dionysius who was a famous convert and disciple of Paul of Tarsus. The confusion of the personalities of Denis of Paris, Dionysius the Areopagite, and pseudo-Dionysius the Areopagite, the author of the writings ascribed to Dionysius brought to France by Louis, was initiated through an Areopagitica written in 836 by Abbot Hilduin of Saint-Denis at the request of Louis the Pious. "Hilduin was anxious to promote the dignity of his church, and it is to him that the quite unfounded identification of the patron saint with Dionysius the Areopagite and his consequent connexion with the apostolic age are due." Hilduin's attribution had been supported for centuries by the monastic community at Abbey of Saint-Denis and it was one of the origins of their pride. In Historia calamitatum, Pierre Abelard gives a short account of the strength of this belief and the monastery's harsh opposition to challenges to their claim. Abelard jokingly pointed out a possibility that the founder of the Abbey could have been another Dionysius, who is mentioned as Dionysius of Corinth by Eusebius. This irritated the community so much that eventually Abelard left in bitterness. As late as the sixteenth century, scholars might still argue for an Eastern origin of the Basilica of Saint-Denis: one was Godefroi Tillman, in a long preface to a paraphrase of the Letters of the Areopagite, printed in Paris in 1538 by Charlotte Guillard. Most historiographers agree that this conflated legend is completely erroneous.

== Depiction in art ==
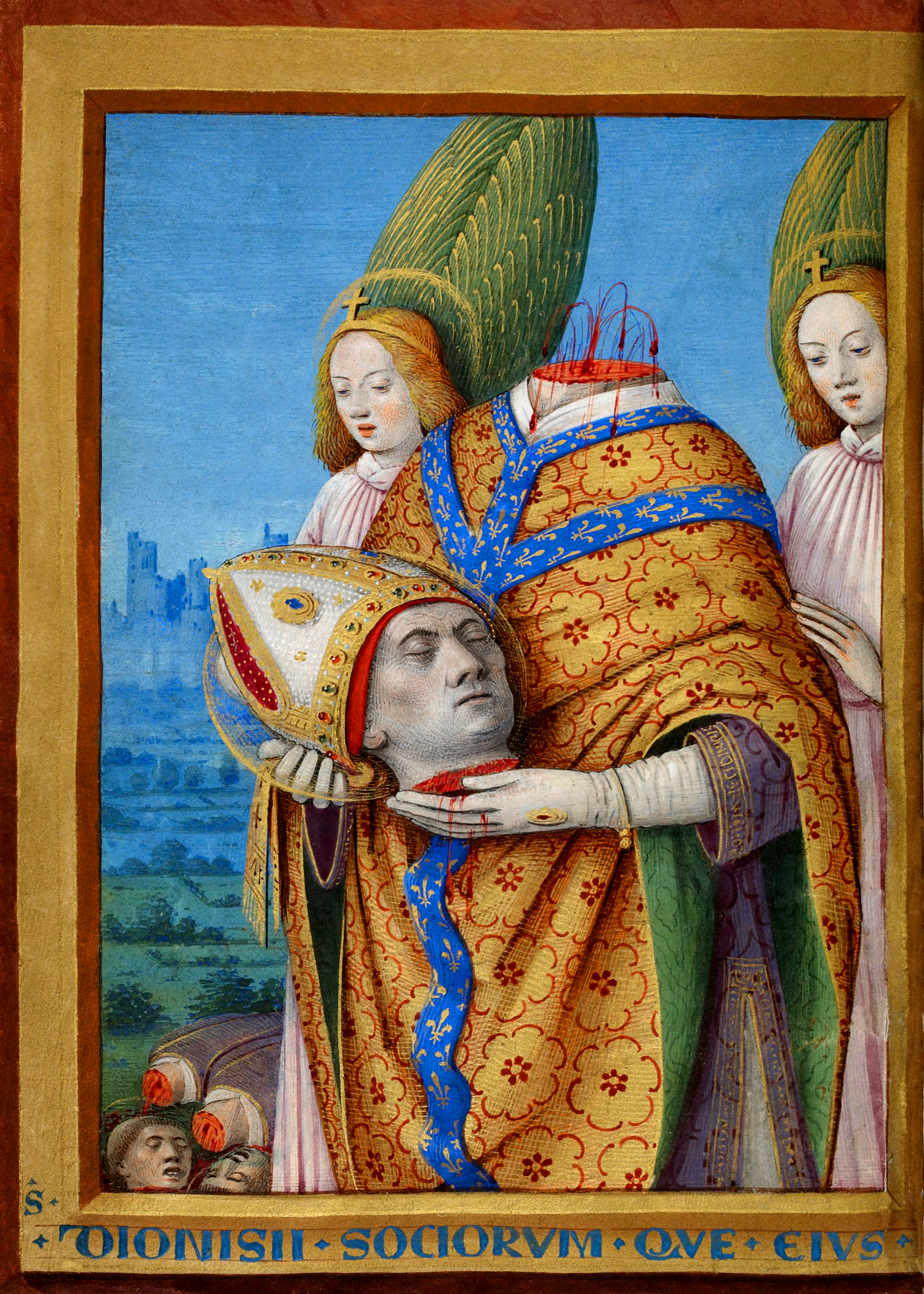
Painting by Jean Bourdichon

Denis' headless walk has led to his being depicted in art decapitated and dressed as a bishop, holding his own (often mitred) head in his hands. Handling the halo in this circumstance poses a unique challenge for the artist. Some put the halo where the head used to be; others have Saint Denis carrying the halo along with the head. Even more problematic than the halo was the issue of how much of his head Denis should be shown carrying.

Throughout much of the Middle Ages, the Abbey of St Denis and the canons of Notre-Dame Cathedral were in dispute over ownership of the saint's head. The Abbey claimed that they had the entire body, whilst the Cathedral claimed to possess the top of his head which, they claimed, had been severed by the executioner's first blow. Thus while most depictions of St Denis show him holding his entire head, in others, the patrons have shown their support for the cathedral's claim by depicting him carrying just the crown of his skull, for example in the mid 13th-century window showing the story at Le Mans Cathedral (Bay 111).

A 1317 illustrated manuscript depicting The Life of Saint Denis, once owned by King Philip V of France, is preserved in the Bibliothèque Nationale in Paris. It was given to the king by his chaplain Gilles, the abbot of Saint-Denis, having been commissioned by Jean de Pontoise, the previous Abbot of Saint-Denis. The manuscript contains seventy-seven miniatures illustrating the life and martyrdom of Saint Denis.

== See also ==
- Peter, Andrew, Paul, and Denise
- Saint Denis, patron saint archive
