= Mark Saint Juste =

- Also known as: Mark St. Juste
- Born: January 23, 1968 (age 58); Boynton, Florida
- Genres: R&B, Hip-Hop, Children's literature
- Occupations: Entrepreneur, tv/film producer, author, songwriter, record producer, dj
- Years active: 1987–present
- Labels: MSJ Records, Street Street Communications
- Website: marksaintjuste.com

Mark Saint Juste (born January 23, 1968) also known as Mark St. Juste is an entrepreneur, television, film and record producer, author and former school teacher. Over the course of his entertainment career he has written, produced and distributed music that has reached the Billboard charts under his independent record label and production company, Street Street Communications. He also wrote, produced and directed Peep Diss Videos, a prime time syndicated Hip-Hop TV show on broadcast television and three documentary films, Shake City 101, Black Beach and Black Beach Weekend. Saint Juste has worked with some of hip-hops most notable artists to successfully explore the realities of hip-hop and leverage its positive messages for the advancement of communities.

Saint Juste was a teacher for 2 years at Deerfield Park Elementary School in Florida. Since then he has worked as a consultant and principal investor in commodities finance and media content production and distribution. He is the President of the Hong Kong and Los Angeles based company, Zhou Limited. March 2020 listed as CEO of UYA Investments acquired motorsports complex located in Chandler, Indiana referenced as Chandler motor speedway. The complex includes drag strip and a 1/2-mile dirt oval. Media resources mention he is partnering with Reno Fontana.

== Career ==
=== Music ===
Mark started his first entertainment company MSJ Records in 1987. Under this label he released his first single "Money" as a solo artist. In 1992 Mark started production company Street Street Communications. The label independently released 13 albums between 1994 and 2001 culminating with the Billboard chart topping soundtrack, Black Beach Hits. Other productions by Saint Juste recognized in Billboard Magazine are "Body Love" and "Doo Doo Brown" which reached the top R&B/Hip-Hop Song chart. Street Street's first album, Florida Funk Bass, Bass, Bass & Mo Bass by A.C. AuFunkster was released Nov 30, 1994.

During Mark's 2 years at Deerfield Park Elementary he used the positive impact of hip hop to engage his students and make learning more fun. Witnessing the impact rap had on his students inspired him to bring the positivity of rap music to kids with the next productions from his record label. As Sweet MSJ, Saint Juste released the singles "We've Got a Lesson to Learn" and "I’m Too Good for Drugs." His students performed "I’m Too Good for Drugs" at the National Drug Abuse Resistance Education (DARE) Convention in Orlando. "I’m Too Good for Drugs" is a single from the Get Me Me Music album that Saint Juste released in 2005. The album is composed of songs that combine educational themed lyrics with hip-hop beats.

=== TV and film ===
In 1999 Mark launched Unlimited Television (UTV), a film and TV production company, and released the reality spring break film, Black Beach. Black Beach was subsequently licensed through the Universal Music Group on DVD as Black Beach Spring Bling. Mark also independently produced and syndicated the Hip Hop celebrity lifestyle TV series, Peep Diss Videos. Peep Diss Videos features one-on-one interviews with Hip Hop's most popular artists such as Jay Z, Snoop Dogg, Pharrell, Ice-T, RL of Next, Naughty By Nature, 702, Chinaman of the 2 Live Crew, Boo Yaa Tribe, The Baka Boyz, Big Boy, Skee-Lo and Young M.C. In its inception, Peep Diss Videos reached approximately 700,000 viewers in South Florida. The program expanded to a prime time slot airing at 7:30 pm Sundays on KDOC-TV in Los Angeles.

Through UTV Mark also produced, directed and released the first documentary film on the inner city dance phenomenon, Krumping. This film followed all star Krump dancers Gizmo, Hurricane, Mijo, Tight Eyes, and Tsunami and others through the streets of Venice, Hollywood and South Central, Los Angeles as they battle dance with their best moves.

In 2010 Saint Juste International distributed the limited theatrical release of the family comedy, Oy Vey! My Son Is Gay! The film was the 10th highest per screen average grossing during its second weekend at the box office.

=== Social projects ===
In 2012 Saint Juste launched an online social activism site to counter the effects of high gas prices www.TwoDollarGas.com.

== Other business ventures ==
=== Zhou Limited ===
Zhou Limite is a firm that trades directly in commodities and offers services in security, media and consulting.

=== Get Me Me ===
In 1998, under Zhou Limited, Mark launched the Get Me Me brand as an online destination for kids with a mission to effect positive change in the world using entertainment and media to promote love.

=== Books ===
Mark completed and released the first book from the Get Me Me series titled My Neighborhood in 2014.

== Filmography ==
- Laugh Bandits Number One (2007)
- Peep Diss Videos: Season One (2007)
- DJ Domination: World Domination (2003)
- Shake City 101 (2002)
- Black Beach Spring Bling (2001)
- Black Beach Weekend (2001)
- Black Beach 2000

== Billboard ==
Chart (2001)	Peak position
US Top R&B/Hip-Hop Albums (Billboard)	70

Chart (1998)	Peak position
US Hot R&B/Hip-Hop Songs (Billboard)	69

== Production Discography ==
- Get Me Me Music
- Black Beach Weekend Hits Volume 1
- Cali Bumps
- Black Spring Break
- Hi De Ho
- Sex
- Florida Funk: Bass Bass Bass and Mo Bass
- NaCl2
